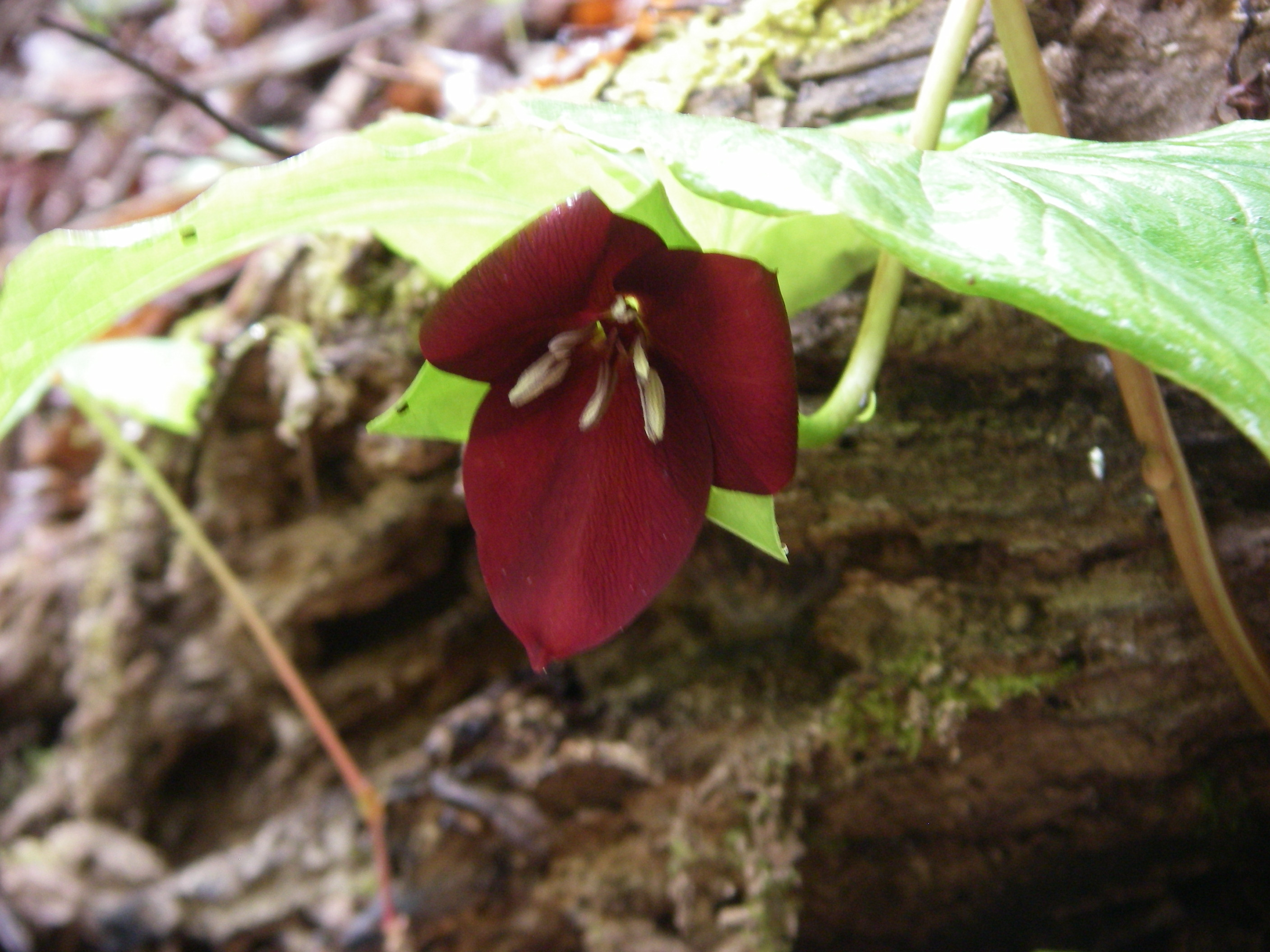
- Great Smoky Mountains National Park, Tennessee

Conservation status
- Vulnerable (NatureServe)

- Near Threatened (IUCN 3.1)

Scientific classification
- Kingdom: Plantae
- Clade: Tracheophytes
- Clade: Angiosperms
- Clade: Monocots
- Order: Liliales
- Family: Melanthiaceae
- Genus: Trillium
- Species: T. vaseyi

Binomial name
- Trillium vaseyi Harb.

Synonyms
- Homotypic synonyms: Trillium erectum var. vaseyi (Harb.) H.E.Ahles; Heterotypic synonyms: Trillium vaseyi f. album House

= Trillium vaseyi =

Species of flowering plant

Trillium vaseyi is a species of flowering plant in the family Melanthiaceae. It is a spring-flowering perennial plant found only in the southeastern United States. The specific epithet vaseyi honors the American plant collector George Richard Vasey, not to be confused with his father Dr. George Vasey. The species is commonly called Vasey's Trillium. It is also known as the sweet wakerobin, sweet trillium, or sweet beth.

== Description ==
Trillium vaseyi has among the largest flowers in genus Trillium, with red petals up to 7 cm long. It grows in rich woods, sometimes on riverbanks but other times on steep slopes.

== Taxonomy ==
Trillium vaseyi was named and described by the American botanist Thomas Grant Harbison in 1901. The type specimen was collected in the mountains of North Carolina in 1878. In his description, Harbison mentions Dr. George Vasey but in fact the type specimen was collected by his son George Richard Vasey.

In 1938, Lane Barksdale described Trillium vaseyi var. simile based on a type specimen collected by the American botanist Henry Allan Gleason in 1904. Although Gleason stated the flower stalk was "declined or cernuous", that of the type specimen is erect. As of January 2025, Trillium vaseyi var. simile (Gleason) Barksd. is a homotypic synonym for Trillium simile Gleason.

Trillium vaseyi is a member of Trillium subgenus Trillium, commonly called the erectum group, seven of which occur in the southeastern United States: Trillium cernuum, Trillium erectum, Trillium flexipes, Trillium rugelii, Trillium simile, Trillium sulcatum, and Trillium vaseyi. Natural hybrids are common within this group.

== Distribution and habitat ==
Trillium vaseyi is endemic to the Southeastern United States. It occurs primarily in the southern Appalachian Mountains in the states of Georgia, North Carolina, South Carolina, and Tennessee. A disjunct population is also known to occur in Lee County, Alabama.

== Conservation ==
As of April 2023, the global conservation status of Trillium vaseyi is listed as vulnerable and near threatened by NatureServe and IUCN (resp.). It is critically imperiled in Alabama.

== Bibliography ==
- Barksdale, Lane (1938). "The pedicellate species of Trillium found in the southern Appalachians". Journal of the Elisha Mitchell Scientific Society. 54 (2): 271–296. JSTOR 24332541.
- Case, Frederick W.; Case, Roberta B. (1997). Trilliums. Portland, Oregon: Timber Press. pp. 170–176. ISBN 978-0-88192-374-2.
- Floden, Aaron; Knapp, Wesley (June 2023). "Typification of the North American species of Trillium subg. Trillium (Melanthiaceae: Parideae)". Phytotaxa. 599 (3): 193–200. Bibcode:2023Phytx.599..193F. doi:10.11646/phytotaxa.599.3.6.
- Harbison, Thomas G. (1901). "New or little known species of Trillium". Biltmore Botanical Studies. 1 (1): 19–24.
