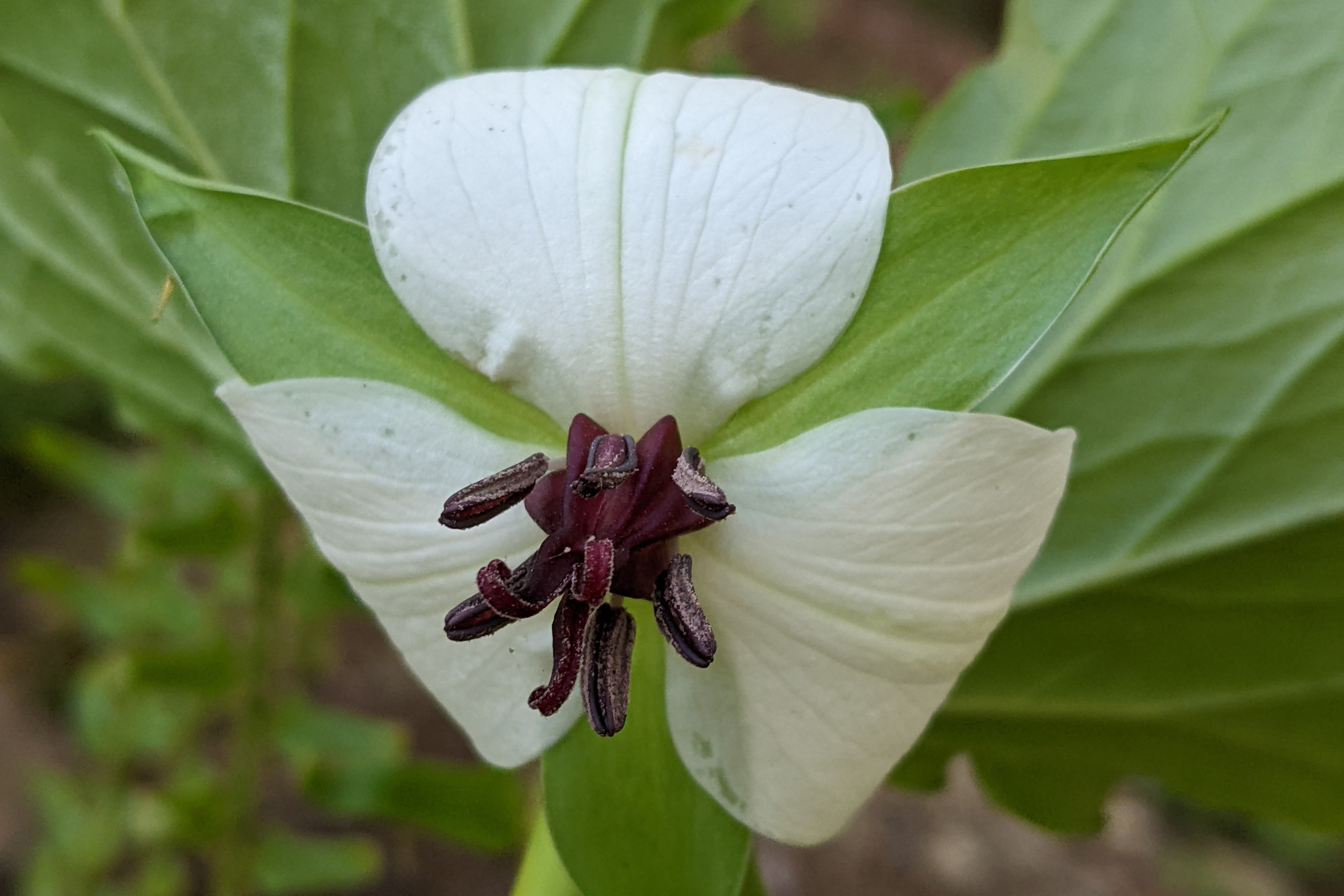
- Mountainous form (McDowell County, NC; observed April 24)

Conservation status
- Apparently Secure (NatureServe)

Scientific classification
- Kingdom: Plantae
- Clade: Tracheophytes
- Clade: Angiosperms
- Clade: Monocots
- Order: Liliales
- Family: Melanthiaceae
- Genus: Trillium
- Species: T. rugelii

Binomial name
- Trillium rugelii Rendle

Synonyms
- Heterotypic synonyms: Trillium affine Rendle; Trillium album (Michx.) Small; Trillium erectum var. album (Michx.) Pursh; Trillium rhomboideum var. album Michx.

= Trillium rugelii =

Species of flowering plant

Trillium rugelii is a species of flowering plant in the family Melanthiaceae. It is endemic to the southeastern United States. Its white flower is typically found nodding beneath the leaves, hence it is known as the southern nodding trillium (not to be confused with Trillium cernuum, which also goes by that name). The specific epithet rugelii honors Ferdinand Rugel, a botanist and plant collector who collected plant specimens throughout the southeastern U.S. during the period 1840–1848. Although the species is apparently secure across its range, statewide it is vulnerable at best.

== Description ==
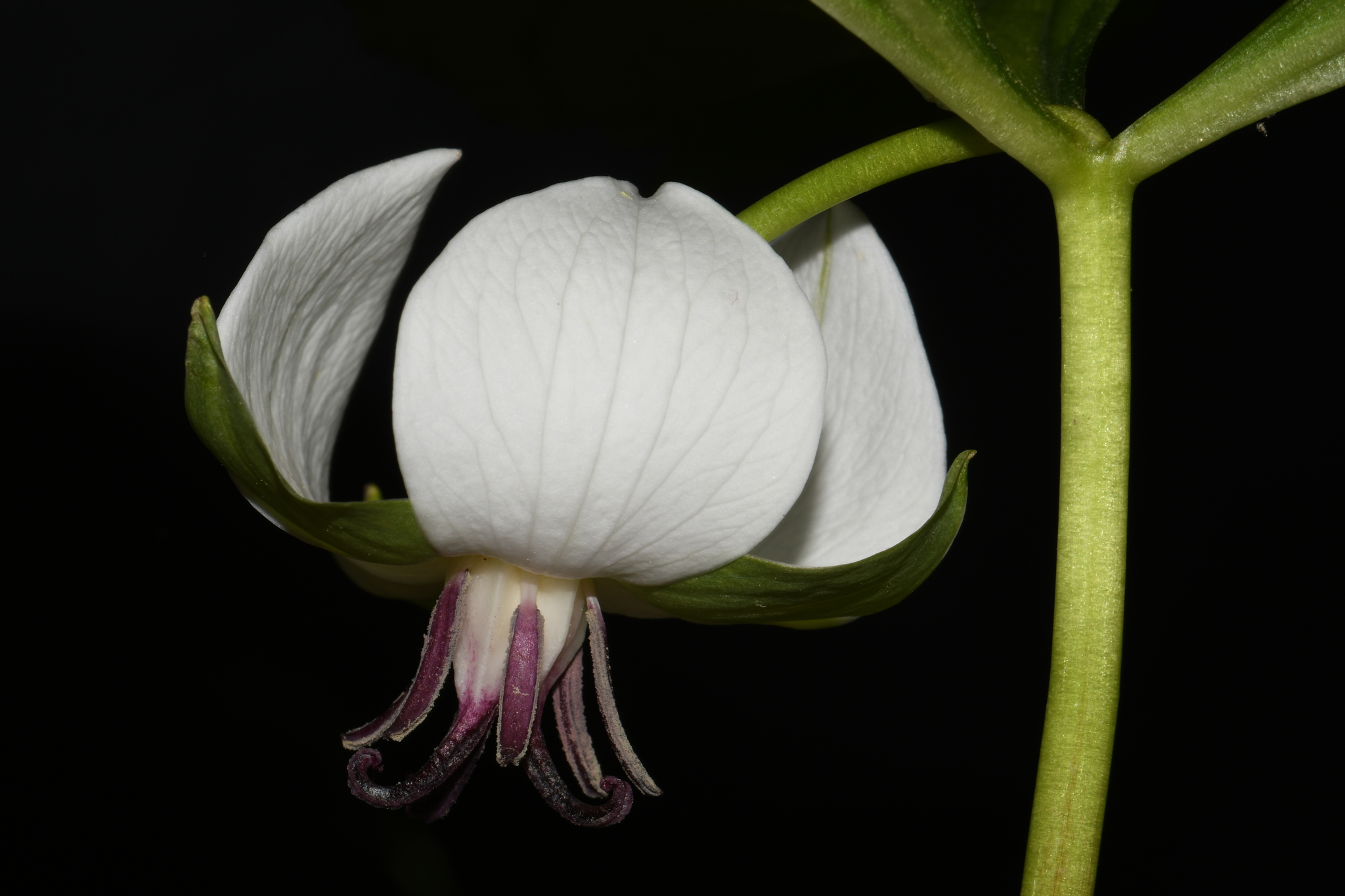
Alabama form (St. Clair County, AL; observed April 11)

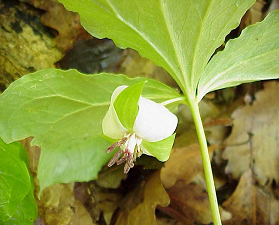
Note the similarity to Trillium cernuum

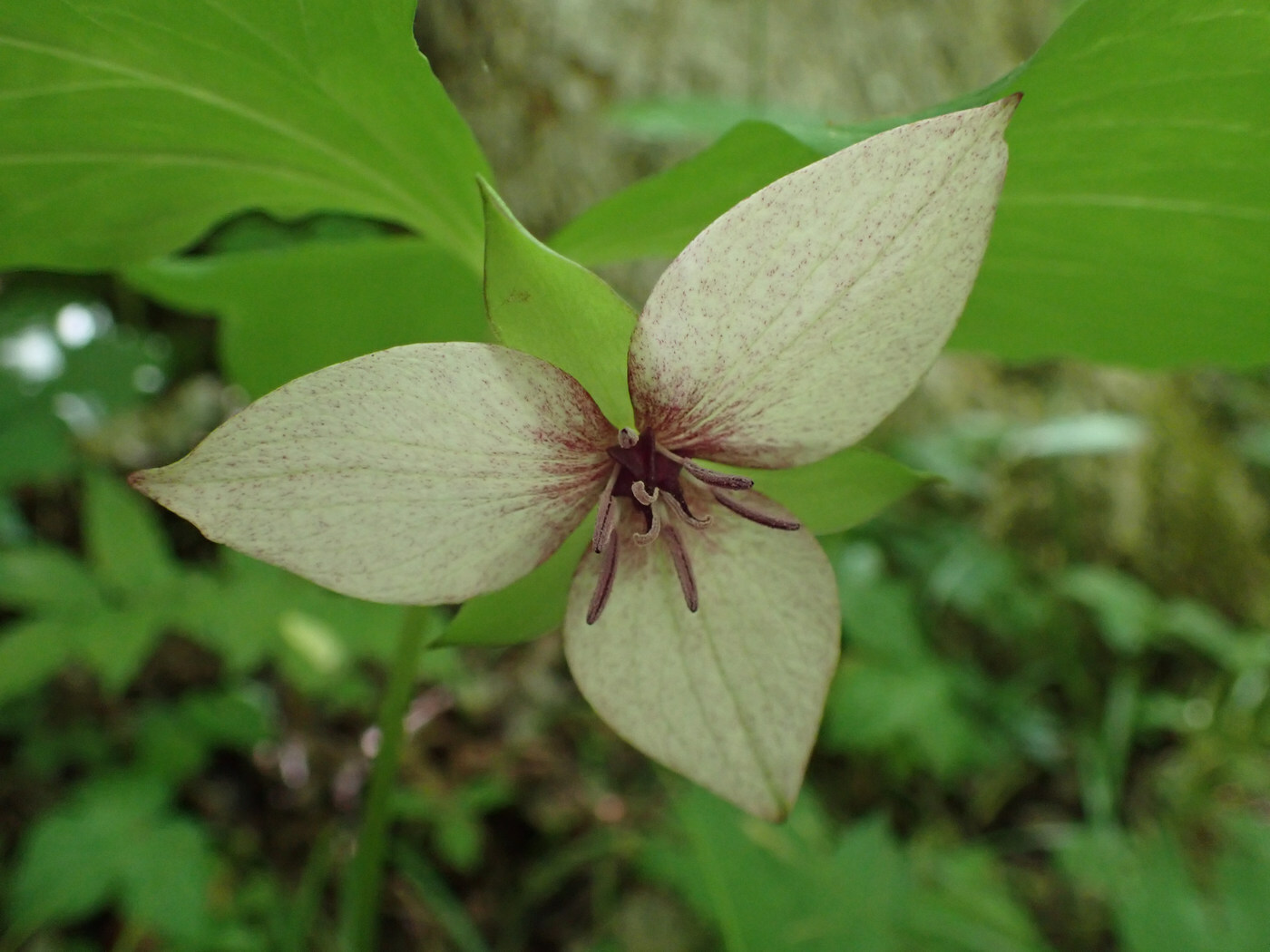
Putative hybrid with Trillium vaseyi (Swain County, NC; observed May 9)

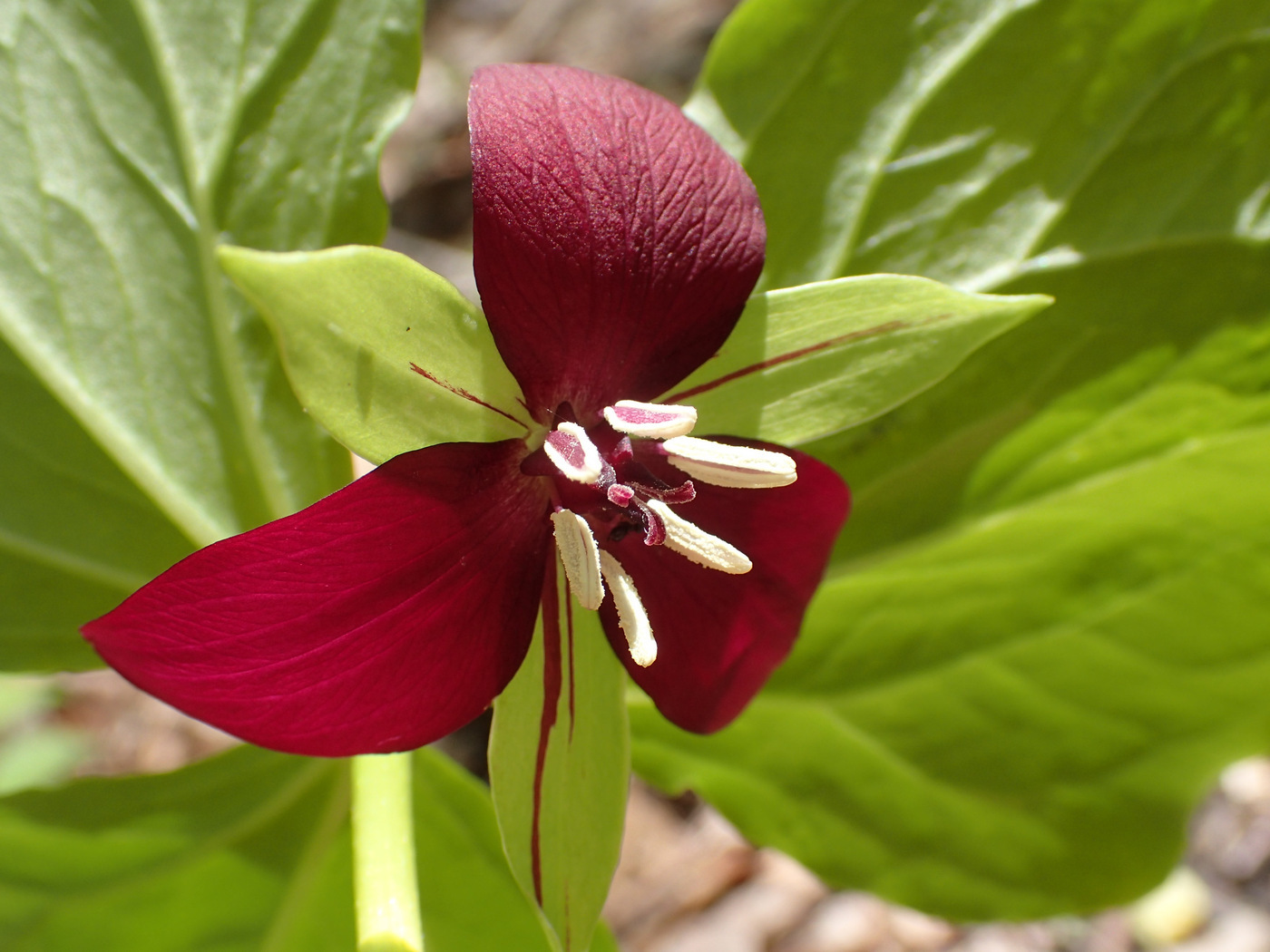
Putative hybrid with Trillium erectum (Yancey County, NC; observed April 26)

Trillium rugelii is a long-lived perennial, herbaceous, flowering plant that persists by means of an underground rhizome. Like all trilliums, it has a whorl of three bracts (leaves) and a single trimerous flower with 3 sepals, 3 petals, two whorls of 3 stamens each, and 3 carpels (fused into a single ovary with 3 stigmas). The white flower has a short, strongly recurved stalk (called a pedicel) nodding below the leaves. The broad petals are recurved at the middle of the petal. The dark purple anthers are conspicuously long, at least as long as the carpels, sometimes extending beyond the carpels. The ovary is flask-shaped.

Trillium rugelii hybridizes with other Trillium species, especially Trillium vaseyi. In that case, the pedicel of the hybrid retains the short, recurved character of Trillium rugelii whereas the petals may be rose colored, dark rose-red, or bicolored due to influence of Trillium vaseyi.

An unnamed form of Trillium rugelii in central Alabama differs from the more typical form in the mountainous regions of Tennessee, North Carolina, South Carolina, and Georgia. It has narrower petals that are strongly recurved from the base (not middle) of the petal. The filaments are white (not purple). The ovary is mostly white, streaked with purple (not completely dark purple as in the mountainous form). The color and length of the anthers is the same in the two forms. The Alabama plants are said to produce "strongly fragrant flowers with the odor of old-fashioned garden roses." Although the floral fragrance is often stronger in southern populations, it remains variable overall. Despite these reports, Trillium rugelii is sometimes called the illscented wakerobin.

=== Similar species ===
With its white flower hanging below the leaves, Trillium rugelii is similar in habit and appearance to Trillium cernuum. Dried specimens are particularly difficult to distinguish. In the field, Trillium rugelii is more robust than Trillium cernuum, with broader, heavily textured petals and longer, dark purple (not pale lavender) anthers. Compared to the mountainous form, the Alabama form of Trillium rugelii more closely resembles Trillium cernuum. In both cases, the long dark purple anthers are the most reliable distinguishing character.

== Taxonomy ==
Trillium rugelii was named and described by the English botanist Alfred Barton Rendle in 1901. The specific epithet rugelii honors Ferdinand Rugel, the botanist who collected the type specimen of Trillium rugelii in 1841. Rugel found the specimen in the mountains near the Broad River in western North Carolina. At the same time he described Trillium rugelii, Rendle also described Trillium affine based on a specimen collected by Rugel in Georgia. The name Trillium affine Rendle is considered to be a synonym for Trillium rugelii Rendle, whereas the latter is a widely accepted name.

Trillium rugelii is a member of Trillium subgenus Trillium, commonly called the erectum group, seven of which occur in the southeastern United States: Trillium cernuum, Trillium erectum, Trillium flexipes, Trillium rugelii, Trillium simile, Trillium sulcatum, and Trillium vaseyi. Natural hybrids are common within this group.

=== Synonyms ===
In 1803, André Michaux named and described Trillium rhomboideum var. album based on a specimen he collected and identified as a white-flowered form of Trillium erectum. However, the type specimen of Michaux's variety is in fact Trillium rugelii, and therefore Trillium rhomboideum var. album Michx. is a synonym for Trillium rugelii Rendle.

In 1813, Frederick Traugott Pursh described Trillium erectum var. album with a smaller flower, white petals, and a red ovary. By reference to a published illustration, Pursh made it clear he was describing a white-flowered form of Trillium erectum. However, since Pursh's variety is based on Trillium rhomboideum var. album Michx., the infraspecific name Trillium erectum var. album (Michx.) Pursh is likewise a synonym for Trillium rugelii Rendle.

In 1903, John Kunkel Small described Trillium album, a white-flowered form of Trillium erectum. Similar to Pursh's variety, Small's species was based on Trillium rhomboideum var. album Michx., and therefore Trillium album (Michx.) Small is a synonym for Trillium rugelii Rendle.

The influential Flora of North America (FNA) accepts Trillium erectum var. album (Michx.) Pursh. As of December 2024, few authorities still follow FNA, but most consider one or both of Trillium erectum var. album (Michx.) Pursh and Trillium album (Michx.) Small to be synonyms for Trillium erectum L. A notable exception is Plants of the World Online, which explicitly cites Floden & Knapp (2023).

== Distribution and habitat ==
Trillium rugelii is endemic to the southeastern United States. It is found in the Great Smoky Mountains, Fernbank Forest, Steven's Creek Heritage Preserve, and other places of the Piedmont and southern Appalachian Mountains in Alabama, Georgia, South Carolina, North Carolina and Tennessee. It prefers to grow near streams in humus-rich soil under the shade of deciduous trees.

== Ecology ==
Trillium rugelii is a long-lived perennial herbaceous plant that blooms mid April to May. Assuming the flower is pollinated, a berry-like capsule matures early to mid summer. The fruits do not appear to be adapted for long distance seed dispersal and most likely fall near the parent plant. In general, Trillium species are myrmecochorous, that is, ants facilitate seed dispersal. Trillium seeds have a white fleshy appendage called an elaiosome, which attracts ants. Since each seed of Trillium rugelii has an attached elaiosome, presumably its seeds are dispersed by ants as well.

== Conservation ==
In 2009, Trillium rugelii was reported to be endangered in Tennessee. As of December 2024, NatureServe reports that Trillium rugelii is apparently secure (G4) across its range. Statewide, it is vulnerable (S3) in Georgia and North Carolina, and imperiled (S2) in Alabama, South Carolina, and Tennessee.

Overall, Trillium rugelii faces a medium level of threat. Significant threats include silvicultural practices, logging, and utility rights-of-way. The species is occasionally threatened by deer grazing and invasive species. Plant collecting for personal collections is also a threat.

== Bibliography ==
- Case, Frederick W.; Case, Roberta B. (1997). Trilliums. Portland, Oregon: Timber Press. ISBN 978-0-88192-374-2.
- Floden, Aaron; Knapp, Wesley (June 2023). "Typification of the North American species of Trillium subg. Trillium (Melanthiaceae: Parideae)". Phytotaxa. 599 (3): 193–200. Bibcode:2023Phytx.599..193F. doi:10.11646/phytotaxa.599.3.6.
- Michaux, André (March 19, 1803). Flora Boreali-Americana: Sistens Caracteres Plantarum Quas in America Septentrionali [Boreal-American Flora: Containing the Characters of the Plants Which He Collected and Discovered in North America]. (51 plates) (2 Vols.) (in Latin). Paris: Apud fratres Levrault (The Levrault Brothers). Year 11 of the French Revolutionary Calendar.
- Pursh, Frederick (1813). Flora Americae Septentrionalis, Vol. 1.
- Rendle, A. B. (1901). "Notes on Trillium". Journal of Botany, British and Foreign. 39. London: 321–356.
