= Nodding trillium (disambiguation) =

Nodding trillium is a common name for Trillium cernuum, a flowering plant native to North America.

Nodding trillium may also refer to:

- Trillium rugelii, a flowering plant native to the southeastern United States
- Trillium flexipes, a flowering plant native to eastern North America
