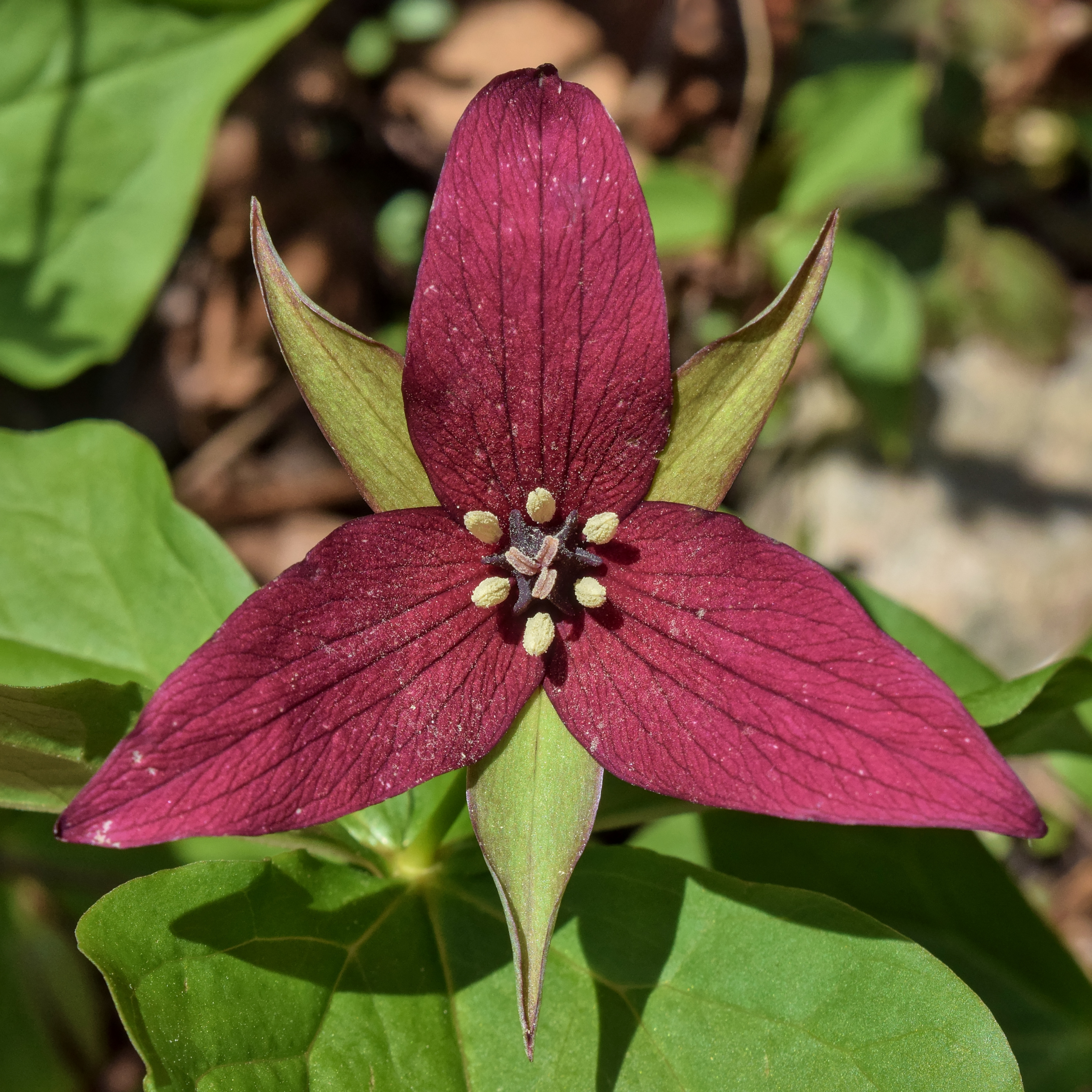
- Blooming in Stephen's Gulch Conservation Area (Ontario, Canada)

Conservation status
- Secure (NatureServe)

Scientific classification
- Kingdom: Plantae
- Clade: Embryophytes
- Clade: Tracheophytes
- Clade: Spermatophytes
- Clade: Angiosperms
- Clade: Monocots
- Order: Liliales
- Family: Melanthiaceae
- Genus: Trillium
- Species: T. erectum

Binomial name
- Trillium erectum L.

Synonyms
- T. erectum var. erectum: Trillium acuminatum Raf.; Trillium atropurpureum M.A.Curtis ex L.C.Beck; Trillium atropurpureum Raf.; Trillium erectum var. atropurpureum (Michx.) Pursh; Trillium erectum var. blandum Jennison; Trillium erectum f. brevipedicellatum Louis-Marie; Trillium erectum var. cahnae Farw.; Trillium erectum f. cahnae (Farw.) Louis-Marie; Trillium erectum var. declinatum A.Gray; Trillium erectum var. flavum Torr.; Trillium erectum var. giganteum Louis-Marie; Trillium erectum var. horizontale Louis-Marie; Trillium erectum f. luteum Louis-Marie; Trillium erectum f. nigrescens Louis-Marie; Trillium erectum f. pallidandrum Vict. & J.Rousseau; Trillium erectum f. parviflorum Louis-Marie; Trillium erectum f. parvum Louis-Marie; Trillium erectum f. polymerum Vict.; Trillium erectum f. rubrostriatum Louis-Marie; Trillium erectum f. sessiloides B.Boivin; Trillium erectum var. sulcatum Barksd.; Trillium flavum Raf.; Trillium foetidum Salisb.; Trillium nutans Raf.; Trillium obovatum Pursh; Trillium pendulum Willd.; Trillium purpureum Elliott; Trillium rhomboideum Michx.; Trillium rhomboideum var. atropurpureum Michx.; Trillium spatulatum Raf.; T. erectum var. album: Trillium album (Michx.) Small; Trillium erectum f. albiflorum R.Hoffm.; Trillium rhomboideum var. album Michx.

= Trillium erectum =

Species of flowering plant

Trillium erectum, the red trillium, also known as wake robin, purple trillium, bethroot, or stinking benjamin, is a species of flowering plant in the family Melanthiaceae. The plant takes its common name "wake robin" by analogy with the European robin, which has a red breast heralding spring. Likewise Trillium erectum is a spring ephemeral plant whose life-cycle is synchronized with that of the forests in which it lives. It is native to the eastern United States and eastern Canada from northern Georgia to Quebec and New Brunswick.

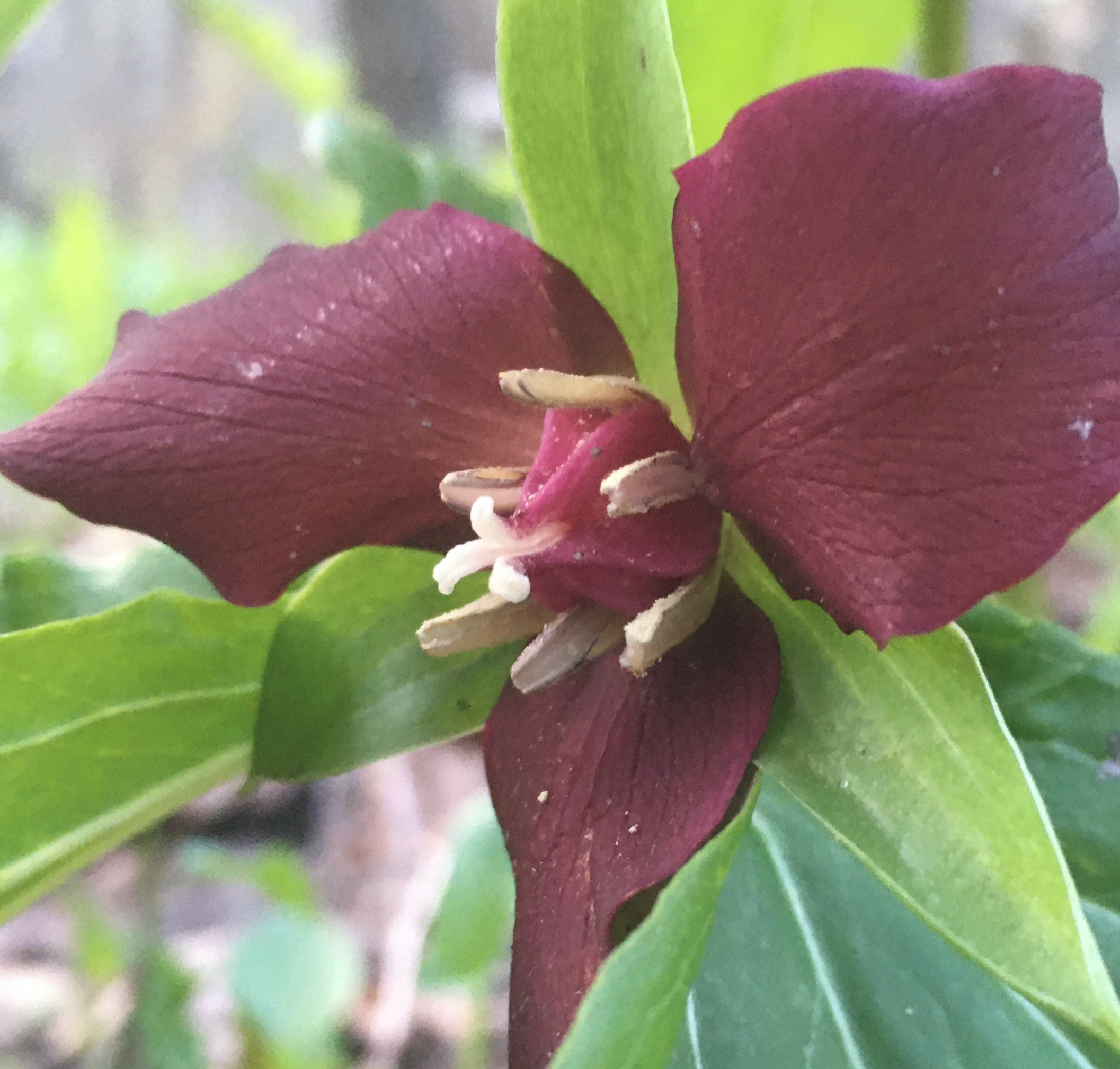
Red trillium close up, showing detail of ovary and stamens

== Description ==
Trillium erectum is a perennial, herbaceous, flowering plant that persists by means of an underground rhizome. Like all trilliums, it has a whorl of three bracts (leaves) and a single trimerous flower with three sepals, three petals, two whorls of three stamens each, and three carpels (fused into a single ovary with three stigmas). It grows to about 40 cm (16 in) in height with a spread of 30 cm (12 in). The petals are dark reddish brown, maroon, purple, pale yellow, or white. The ovary is dark purple to maroon regardless of petal color. If the flower is successfully pollinated, the petals wither, leaving behind a fruit that ripens to a dark red berry-like capsule, 1–1.5 cm (0.39–0.59 in) long.

=== Species complex ===
Trillium erectum shares many anatomical details with other North American Trillium species. These species hybridize in the wild, which has led some researchers to group them into a species complex, specifically, a syngameon of semispecies.

The combinations of traits that are supposed to differentiate members of the complex from one another are sometimes inconsistently combined in wild populations. This has led some researchers to declare the individual species invalid, and refer to the species complex collectively as T. erectum (sensu lato). Others acknowledge the existence of introgression and hybrid swarm formation between some or all complex members, but maintain that the named species within the complex represent convenient groups with common features.

Members of the T. erectum complex have flowers with the following commonalities: (1) petals that are coarse and stiff in texture (in contrast with the wavy edges of other species), (2) petals that do not change color after pollination, (3) petals with prominent, netted veins, (4) fleshy stigmas that are attached to the ovary separately, without a common style, and (5) conspicuous, deeply-ridged ovaries.

North American members of the T. erectum species complex:

- T. cernuum
- T. erectum
- T. flexipes
- T. rugelii
- T. simile
- T. sulcatum
- T. vaseyi

The Asian species T. camschatcense, resembles the North American T. flexipes very closely, and itself has close relatives with similar floral features. However, trillium speciation in this group of Asian species is characterized by differences in chromosome number, with hybrids more definitively distinguishable from parent species by karyotype.

- T. apetalon
- T. camschatcense
- T. channellii
- T. × hagae
- T. smallii
- T. tschonoskii

== Taxonomy ==
Trillium erectum was first described by the Swedish botanist Carl Linnaeus in 1753. The specific epithet erectum means "upright, erect", a reference to the erect pedicel of some forms of this species. In many populations, however, the pedicel leans or declines, sometimes declining beneath the leaves, making the name somewhat inappropriate.

In 1803 André Michaux introduced the name Trillium rhomboideum to describe a form of T. erectum with black fruit in "the high mountains of North Carolina". The specific epithet rhomboideum refers to the broadly rhombic leaves of this (and all) forms of T. erectum. Michaux also described Trillium rhomboideum var. atropurpureum, a variety with large, dark purple petals. A decade later in 1813, Frederick Traugott Pursh referred to Michaux's variety more simply as Trillium erectum var. atropurpureum. Perhaps unaware of these taxonomic developments, other botanists subsequently described Trillium atropurpureum. The epithet atropurpureum means "dark-purple coloured", a reference to the petal color of certain forms of T. erectum. Indeed, in some locales T. erectum is commonly known as the purple trillium.

=== Infraspecies ===
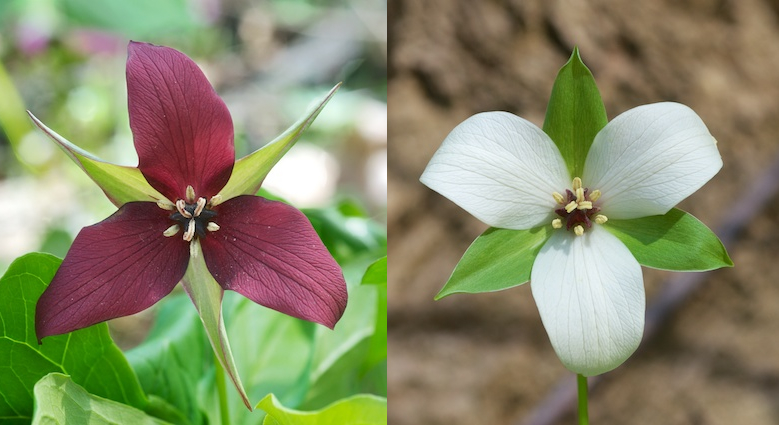
Composite image showing both red and white color morphs of the flower of Trillium erectum. Note that both morphs have a dark purple gynoecium with contrasting anthers.

As of October 2021, Plants of the World Online (POWO) accepts two infraspecific names:

- Trillium erectum var. album (Michx.) Pursh
- Trillium erectum var. erectum

POWO lists 30 synonyms for variety erectum and 3 synonyms for variety album. Michaux introduced the term album in 1803 by describing Trillium rhomboideum var. album, a variety with a smaller flower and white petals. Pursh gave a similar description for Trillium erectum var. album in 1814. The word album means "bright, dead-white", a reference to the variety's white petals, a distinctive feature noted by both Michaux and Pursh.

John Kunkel Small raised T. rhomboideum var. album Michx. to species rank in 1903. In his description, he added long anthers to the list of characters cited by Michaux while expanding the range of the taxon to include North Carolina, Tennessee, and Georgia. In 1917, R.R. Gates recognized the existence of two distinct forms of T. erectum with white petals, one of which was represented by the previously mentioned Trillium album (Michx.) Small. This prompted Ralph Hoffmann to propose Trillium erectum f. albiflorum, a white-flowered form of T. erectum that occurs occasionally and spontaneously throughout the range of the species. Thus the distinct taxa recognized by Gates were fully realized by 1922.

POWO cites the Flora of North America (FNA) as an authority for Trillium erectum var. album (Michx.) Pursh. The treatment of the variety in FNA expands the original concept described by Michaux to include the occasional white-flowered red trillium found throughout the range of the species. Under this scheme, all non-white petal colors (including yellow) comprise the typical variety (var. erectum). Thus FNA lumps the two forms recognized by Gates into a single taxon. In contrast, POWO restricts the range of Trillium erectum var. album to eastern Tennessee and western North Carolina. Noting that its distribution is poorly understood, Flora of the Southeastern United States (FSUS) describes a white-flowered variety of T. erectum common to the foothills of the Great Smoky Mountains, in North Carolina and Tennessee, but rare elsewhere. FSUS suggests that variety album may be genetically distinct from variety erectum, while other evidence suggests there is little genetic difference between the two varieties.

== Distribution ==
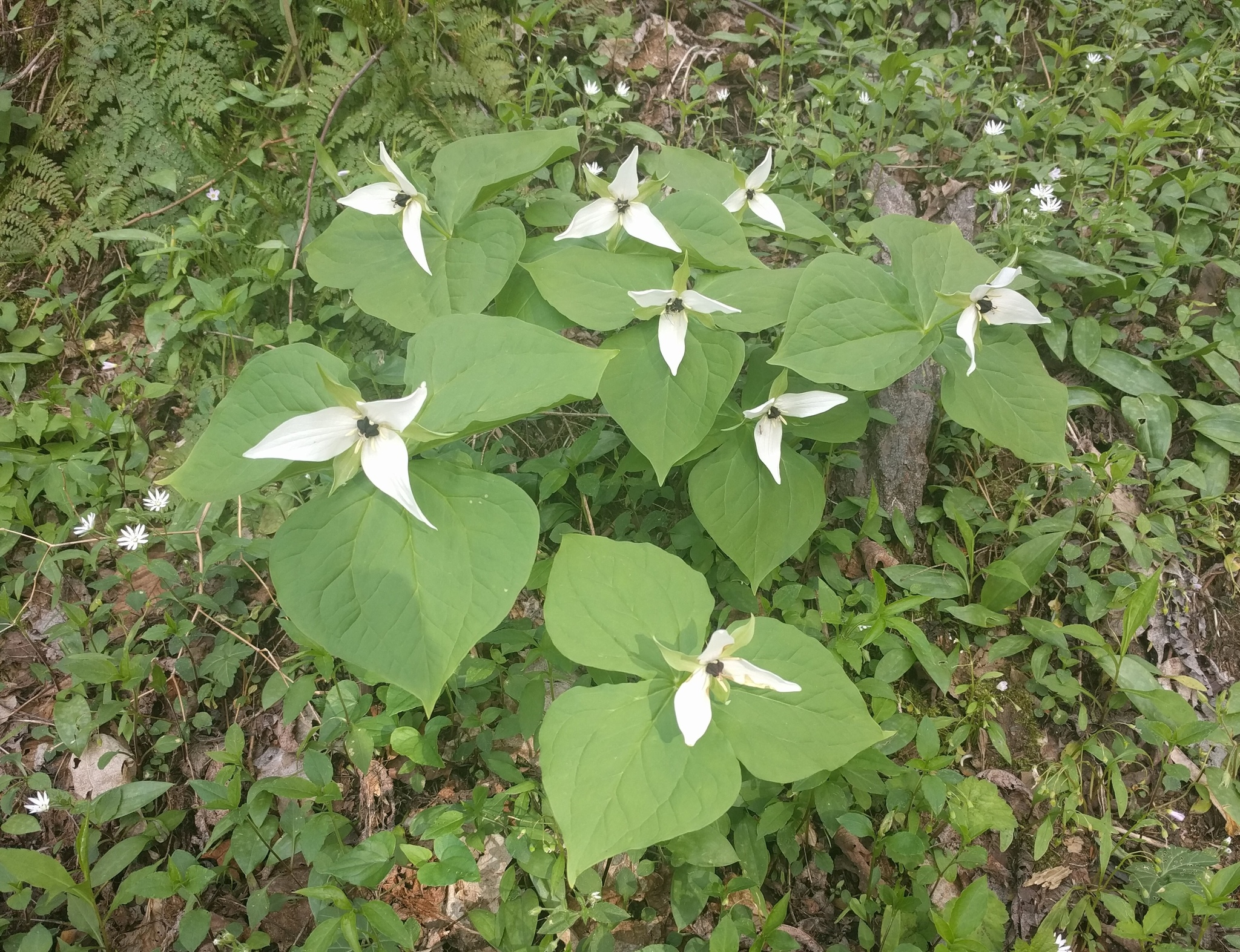
Trillium erectum var. album in the Great Smoky Mountains National Park (April)

Trillium erectum is native to eastern North America. Its range extends from northern Georgia in the southeastern United States to Quebec and New Brunswick in eastern Canada, and as far west as Michigan and southern Ontario. The species is known to occur in the following provinces and states:

- Canada: New Brunswick, Nova Scotia, Ontario, Quebec
- United States: Connecticut, Delaware, Georgia, Illinois, Indiana, Kentucky, Maine, Maryland, Massachusetts, Michigan, New Hampshire, New Jersey, New York, North Carolina, Ohio, Pennsylvania, Rhode Island, South Carolina, Tennessee, Vermont, Virginia, West Virginia

Trillium erectum var. album (as described in the Flora of the Southeastern United States) occurs in western North Carolina, eastern Tennessee, and other areas surrounding the Great Smoky Mountains, primarily at elevations less than 450 m (1,480 ft).

As of October 2019, Trillium erectum is globally secure. It is critically imperiled in Delaware, Illinois, and Rhode Island.

== Ecology ==
Trillium erectum is a carrion-scented flower. It produces fetid or putrid odors purported to attract carrion fly and beetle pollinators. The fetid odor is described as that of a wet dog. The common name stinking benjamin refers to this characteristic of the plant. "Benjamin" is a corruption of the word benzoin, which itself is a corruption of the word "benjoin", a plant-based organic compound used in the manufacture of perfume. Despite the origins of the common name, the chemical basis of carrion-scented flowers is not well understood.

Trillium erectum can tolerate extreme cold in winter, surviving temperatures down to −35 °C (−31 °F).

== Uses ==
The root of the red trillium was used by various indigenous peoples of North America as an aid in childbirth, hence the common name birthwort or birthroot (which is sometimes corrupted to bethroot). Root tea was used for menstrual disorders, to induce childbirth, and to aid in labor. The Cherokee peoples used a poultice of the whole plant to treat tumors, inflammation, and ulcers.

The leaves contain calcium oxalate as raphides and should not be consumed by humans.

Trillium erectum is cultivated as a flowering ornamental plant. Although not as showy as T. grandiflorum, the flowers of some forms of T. erectum can be quite striking, especially since it tends to form large clumps. It has received the Award of Garden Merit from the Royal Horticultural Society.

== Bibliography ==
- Barksdale, Lane (1938). "The pedicellate species of Trillium found in the southern Appalachians". Journal of the Elisha Mitchell Scientific Society. 54 (2): 271–296. JSTOR 24332541.
- Case, Frederick W.; Case, Roberta B. (1997). Trilliums. Portland, Oregon: Timber Press. ISBN 978-0-88192-374-2.
- Gledhill, David (2008). The Names of Plants (4th ed.). Cambridge University Press. ISBN 978-0-521-86645-3.
- Weakley, Alan S. (2020). "Flora of the Southeastern United States". University of North Carolina Herbarium, North Carolina Botanical Garden.
- Weakley, Alan S.; Southeastern Flora Team (2022). "Flora of the southeastern United States". University of North Carolina Herbarium, North Carolina Botanical Garden.
