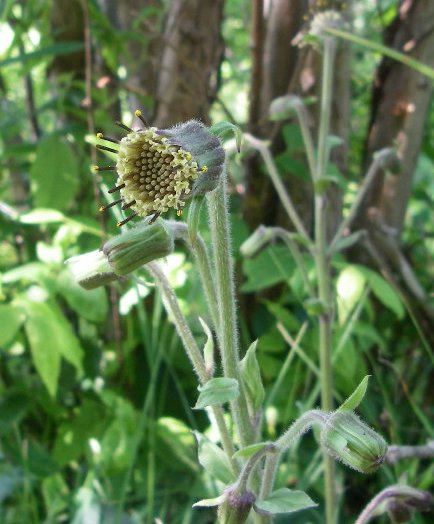

Conservation status
- Vulnerable (NatureServe)

Scientific classification
- Kingdom: Plantae
- Clade: Embryophytes
- Clade: Tracheophytes
- Clade: Spermatophytes
- Clade: Angiosperms
- Clade: Eudicots
- Clade: Asterids
- Order: Asterales
- Family: Asteraceae
- Subfamily: Asteroideae
- Tribe: Senecioneae
- Genus: Rugelia; Shuttlew. ex Chapm.
- Species: R. nudicaulis

Binomial name
- Rugelia nudicaulis Shuttlew. ex Chapm.

Synonyms
- Homotypic synonyms: Cacalia rugelia (A.Gray) T.M.Barkley & Cronquist; Senecio rugelia A.Gray

= Rugelia =

Genus of flowering plant

Rugelia nudicaulis (Rugel's Indian plantain or Rugels ragwort), the sole species of the genus Rugelia, blooms in summer. It is a wildflower endemic to higher elevations in the Great Smoky Mountains. It is a rare species in Tennessee. Genetic diversity in this plant, assessed using allozymes, is so low that the species may not survive changing environmental conditions. Both the scientific name and the common names honor Ferdinand Rugel, a botanist and plant collector who collected plant specimens throughout the southeastern United States during the period 1840–1848.

== Taxonomy ==
The monotypic genus Rugelia was described by the American botanist Alvan Wentworth Chapman in 1860. In his description, Chapman attributed both the generic name Rugelia and the specific epithet nudicaulis to R.J. Shuttleworth. The names honor Ferdinand Rugel, the botanist who collected the type specimen of Rugelia nudicaulis in 1842.

In 1883, the American botanist Asa Gray placed Rugelia nudicaulis in genus Senecio as Senecio rugelia. In 1974, Senecio rugelia was placed in genus Cacalia as Cacalia rugelia. As of December 2024, both Senecio rugelia A.Gray and Cacalia rugelia (A.Gray) T.M.Barkley & Cronquist are considered to be homotypic synonyms of Rugelia nudicaulis Shuttlew. ex Chapm.

== Bibliography ==
- Chapman, Alvan Wentworth; Eaton, Daniel Cady (1865). Flora of the southern United States. New York: Ivison, Phinney & Co.
