= White trillium (disambiguation) =

White trillium is a common name for Trillium grandiflorum, a flowering plant native to North America.

White trillium may also refer to:

- Trillium flexipes, a flowering plant native to eastern North America
- Trillium ovatum, a flowering plant native to western North America
- Trillium simile, a flowering plant native to the southern Appalachian Mountains in southeastern United States
