= Nodding wakerobin =

Nodding wakerobin is a common name for several plants and may refer to:

- Trillium cernuum
- Trillium flexipes, native to North America
