= Fusinus hartvigii =

Scientific classification
- Kingdom: Animalia
- Phylum: Mollusca
- Class: Gastropoda
- Subclass: Caenogastropoda
- Order: Neogastropoda
- Family: Fasciolariidae
- Genus: Fusinus
- Species: F. hartvigii

Binomial name
- Fusinus hartvigii (Shuttleworth, 1856)

Synonyms
- Fusus hartvigii Shuttleworth, 1856

Species of gastropod

Fusinus hartvigii is a species of sea snail, a marine gastropod mollusc in the family Fasciolariidae, the spindle snails, the tulip snails and their allies.
