= Thomas Patrick =

Thomas Patrick may refer to:

- Thomas Patrick (Ontario politician) (1896–1957), Canadian farmer and politician, member of the Legislative Assembly of Ontario
- Thomas Alfred Patrick (1864–1943), Canadian politician and physician, member of the North-West Legislative Assembly
- Thomas Stewart Patrick (1944–2019), American botanist
