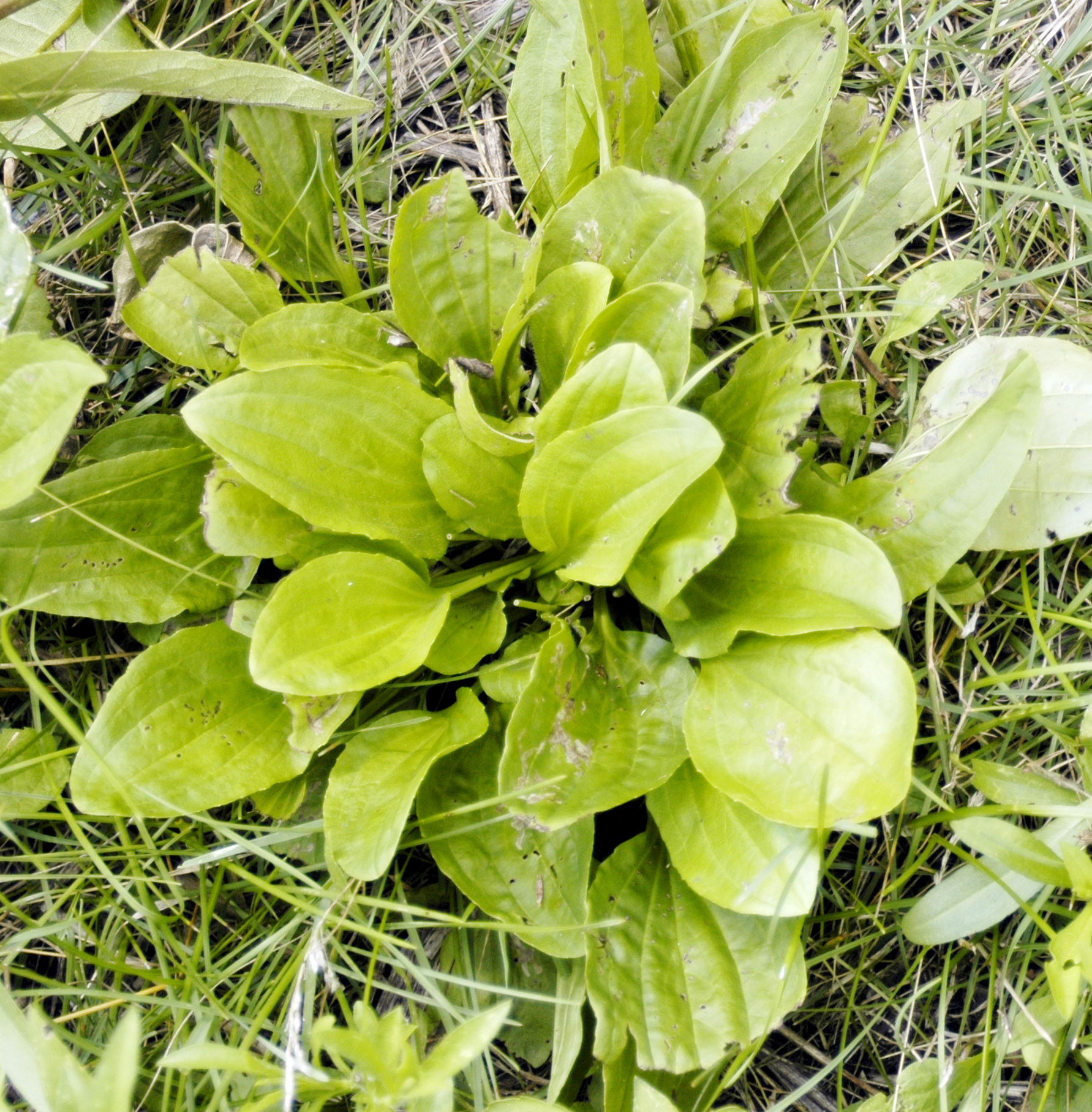

Conservation status
- Secure (NatureServe)

Scientific classification
- Kingdom: Plantae
- Clade: Embryophytes
- Clade: Tracheophytes
- Clade: Angiosperms
- Clade: Eudicots
- Clade: Asterids
- Order: Lamiales
- Family: Plantaginaceae
- Genus: Plantago
- Species: P. rugelii

Binomial name
- Plantago rugelii Decne.

Synonyms
- Heterotypic synonyms: Plantago kamtschatika Hook.; Plantago rugelii var. alterniflora Farw.; Plantago rugelii var. asperula Farw.; Plantago rugelii f. fasciculata Moldenke

= Plantago rugelii =

Species of flowering plant in the plantain family

Plantago rugelii is an edible species of flowering plant in the plantain family, Plantaginaceae. It is native to North America, where it occurs in eastern Canada and the central and eastern United States. Its common names include American plantain, blackseed plantain, and pale plantain. The specific epithet rugelii honors Ferdinand Rugel, a botanist and plant collector who collected plant specimens throughout the southeastern United States during the period 1840–1848.

== Description ==
This perennial herb grows from a taproot and fibrous root system. Extract from the roots of this plant have been shown to inhibit the hatching of nematodes. It produces a basal rosette of wide oval leaves with longitudinal veining and a somewhat waxy texture. The base of the petiole may be reddish or purple. A scape bears clusters of whitish flowers. The fruit is a capsule about half a centimeter long containing several seeds. It splits down the middle. Plantago major is very similar, but it lacks the red tinge on the petioles and its leaves are darker and waxier.

== Taxonomy ==
Plantago rugelii was named and described by the French botanist Joseph Decaisne in 1852. Its holotype is archived in the Muséum national d’Histoire naturelle in Paris. The specific epithet rugelii honors Ferdinand Rugel, the botanist who collected an isotype of Plantago rugelii in Decatur, Alabama in 1843. The species is commonly known as Rugel's plantain.

== Habitat ==
Plantago rugelii is commonly found in areas such as meadows, woodland borders, and stream banks, as well as in lawns and gardens and near paved areas.

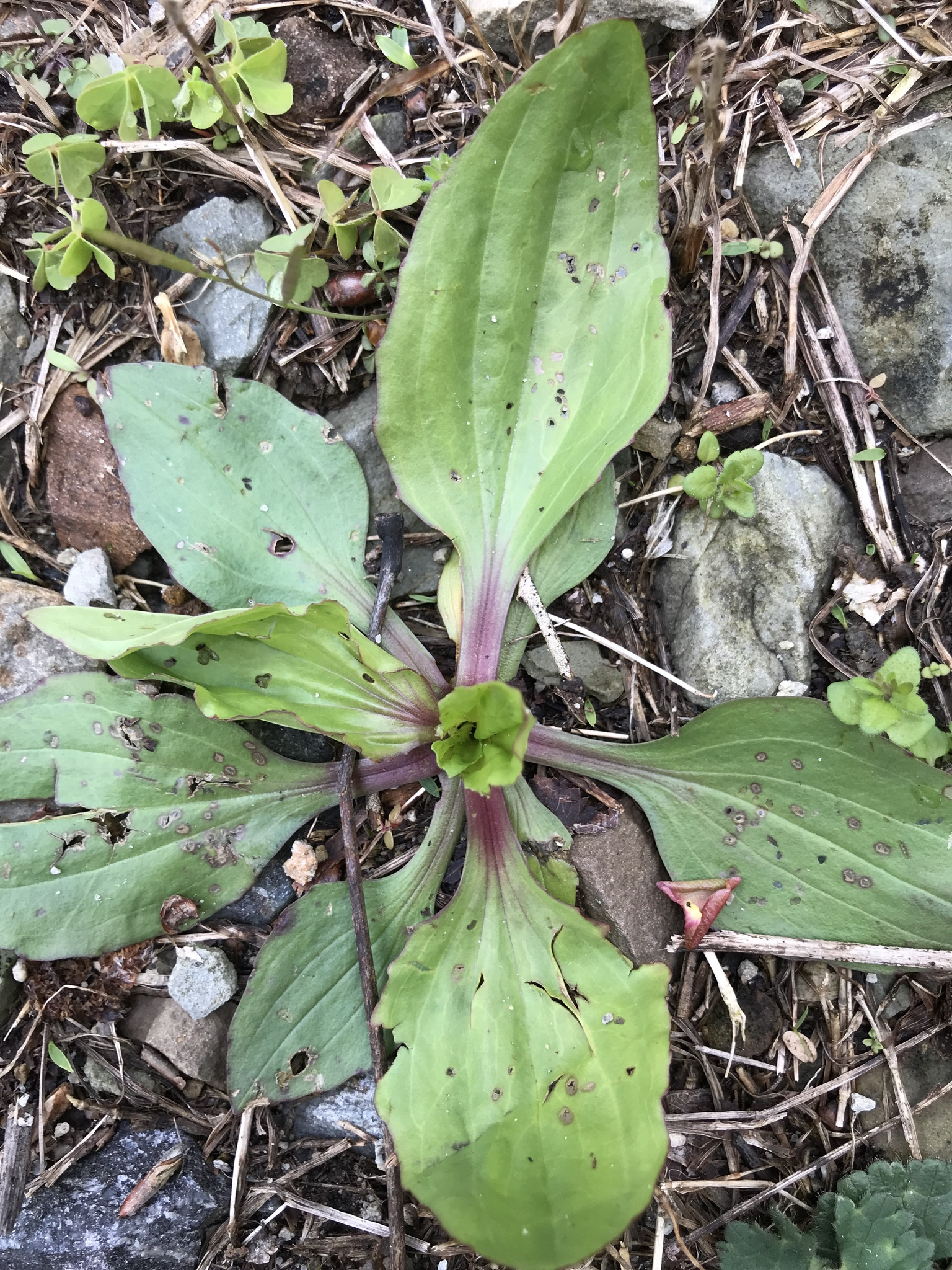
Leaves sprouting in spring, showing purple leaf bases

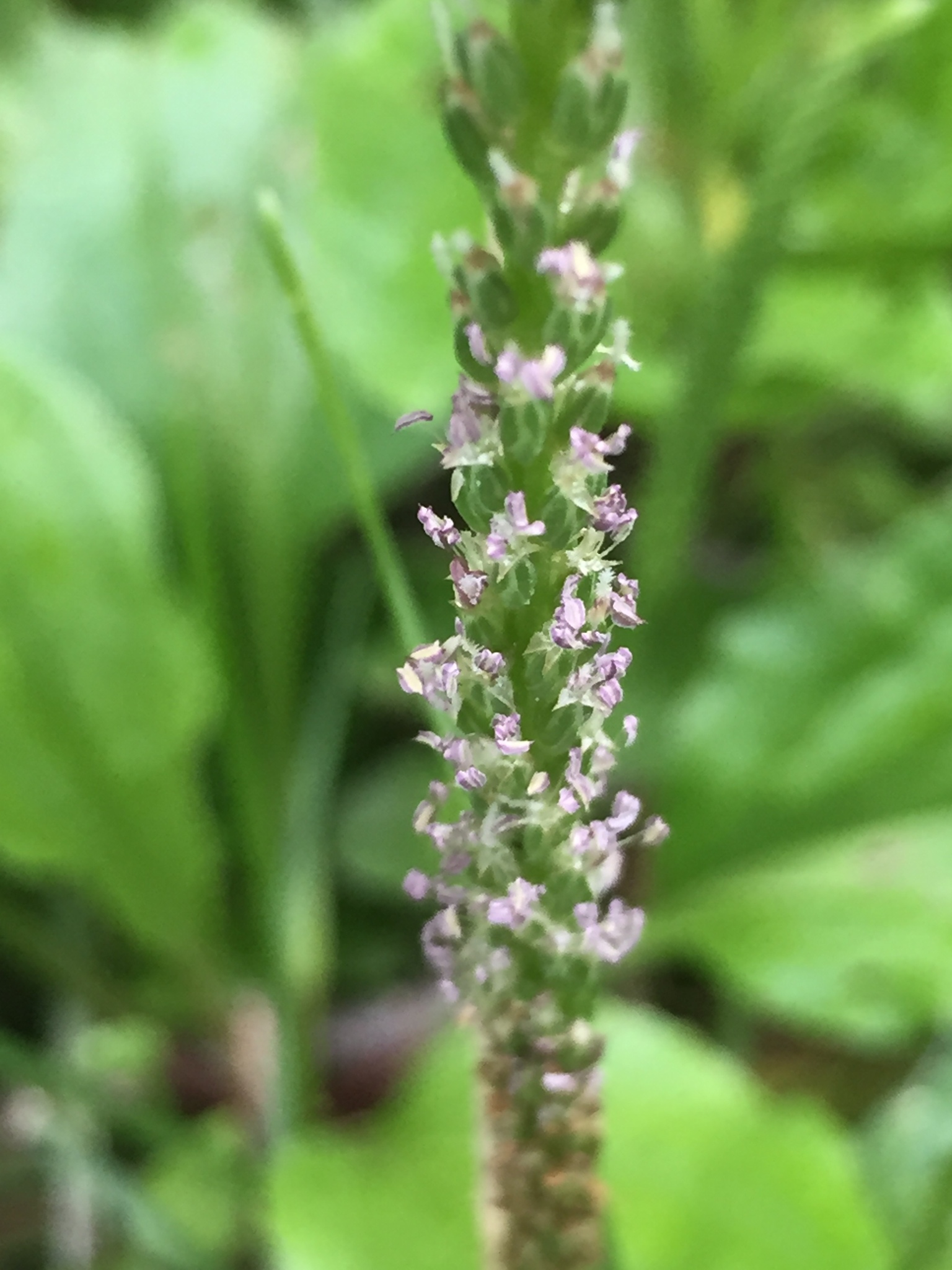
Flowers

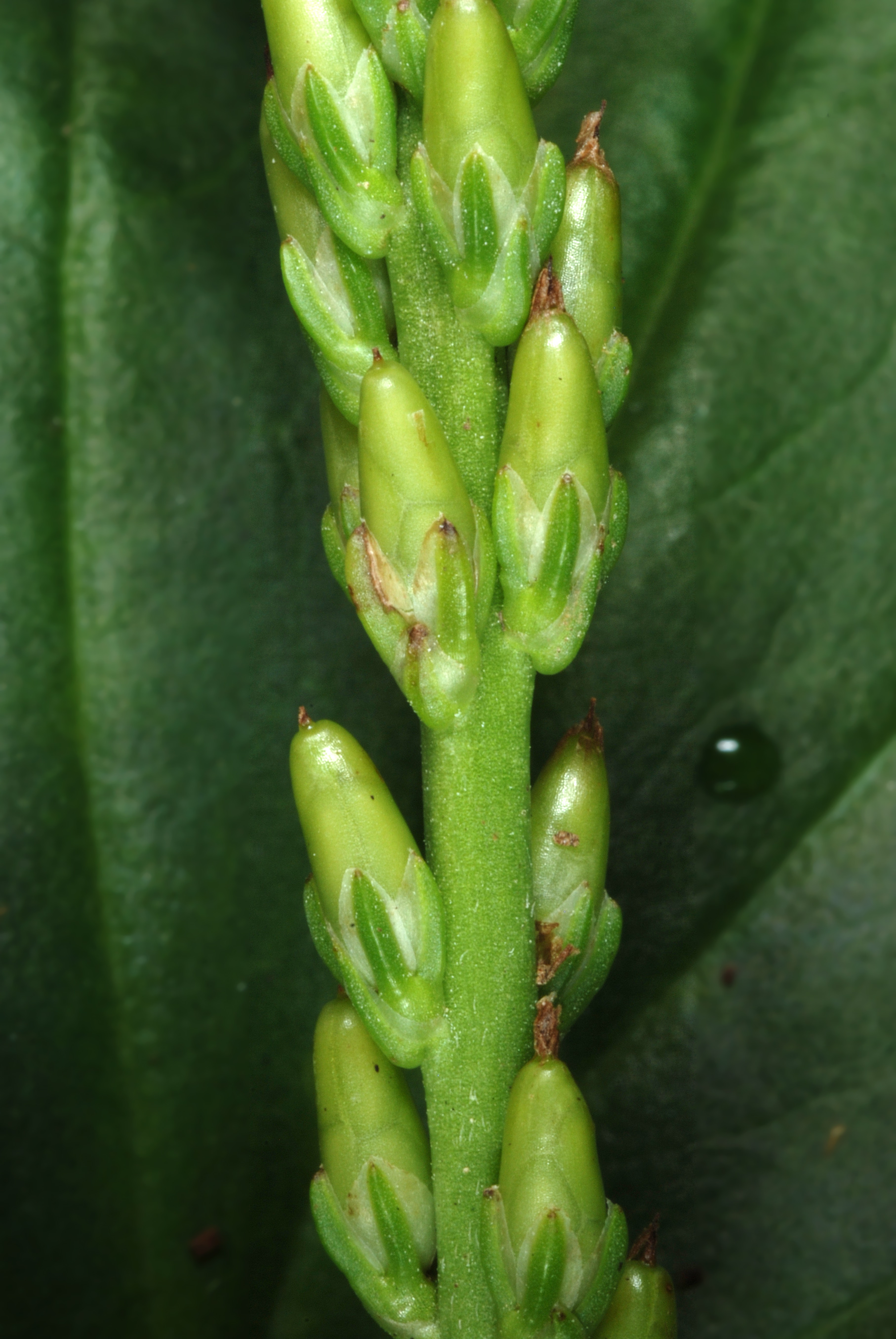
Immature seed pods. They are longer than those of Plantago major.

== Bibliography ==
- Decaisne, Joseph (1852). "Plantaginaceae". In Candolle, Alphonse Pyramus de (ed.). Prodromus Systematis Naturalis Regni Vegetabilis, Vol. 13, Part 1. pp. 693–738.
