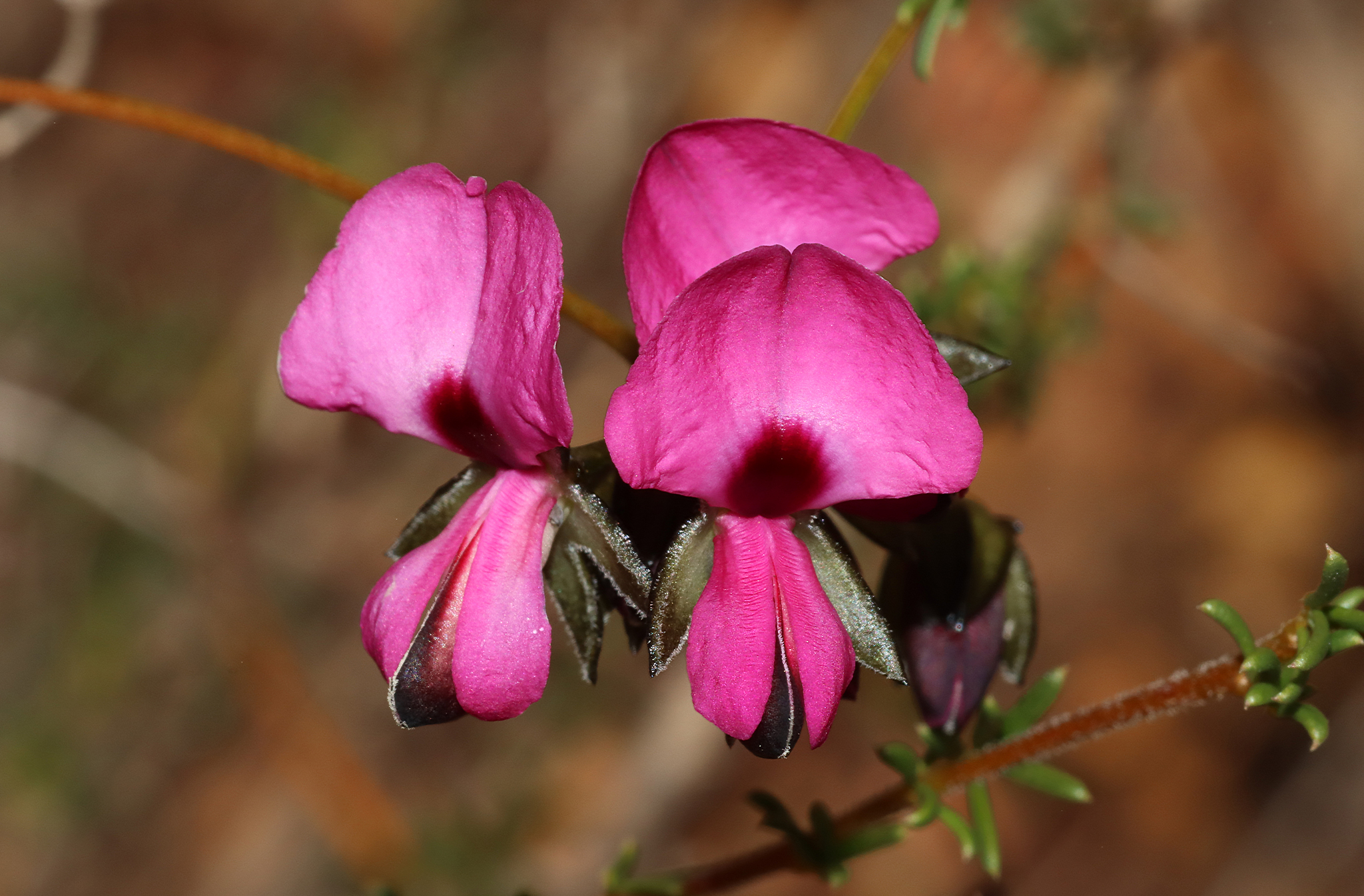
- Near York

Scientific classification
- Kingdom: Plantae
- Clade: Tracheophytes
- Clade: Angiosperms
- Clade: Eudicots
- Clade: Rosids
- Order: Fabales
- Family: Fabaceae
- Subfamily: Faboideae
- Genus: Gompholobium
- Species: G. shuttleworthii

Binomial name
- Gompholobium shuttleworthii Meisn.

Synonyms
- Burtonia asperula S.Moore; Gompholobium asperulum (S.Moore) Crisp; Gompholobium sp. 'Yanchep'

= Gompholobium shuttleworthii =

Species of legume

Gompholobium shuttleworthii is a species of flowering plant in the pea family Fabaceae and is endemic to the south-west of Western Australia. It is an erect shrub with pinnate leaves with five to nine leaflets, and pink or purple flowers with some darker markings.

== Description ==
Gompholobium shuttleworthii is an erect shrub that typically grows to a height of 10–50 cm (3.9–19.7 in) and has flattened, hairy stems. The leaves are pinnate, arranged in whorls and 5–12 mm (0.20–0.47 in) long with five to nine leaflets appearing cylindrical, but with the edges curved downwards and one or two grooves along the lower surface. The flowers are pink or purple with some darker markings, each flower on a pedicel 2.5–5.5 mm (0.098–0.217 in) long with bracteoles about 2 mm (0.079 in) long. The sepals are 8–9 mm (0.31–0.35 in) long, the standard petal about 10–11 mm (0.39–0.43 in) long, the wings 8.5–10.3 mm (0.33–0.41 in) long and the keel 9.0–9.5 mm (0.35–0.37 in) long. Flowering occurs from September to December and the fruit is a cylindrical pod.

== Taxonomy ==
Gompholobium shuttleworthii was first formally described in 1844 by Carl Meissner in Lehmann's Plantae Preissianae. The specific epithet (shuttleworthii) honours Robert J. Shuttleworth.

== Distribution and habitat ==
This species of pea grows in a range of habitats including flats and rocky outcrops in the Avon Wheatbelt, Geraldton Sandplains, Jarrah Forest, Mallee and Swan Coastal Plain biogeographic regions of south-western Western Australia.

== Conservation status ==
Gompholobium shuttleworthii is classified as "not threatened" by the Government of Western Australia Department of Biodiversity, Conservation and Attractions.
