= Sessility (botany) =

Leaves or flowers that grow directly from the stem or peduncle of a plant

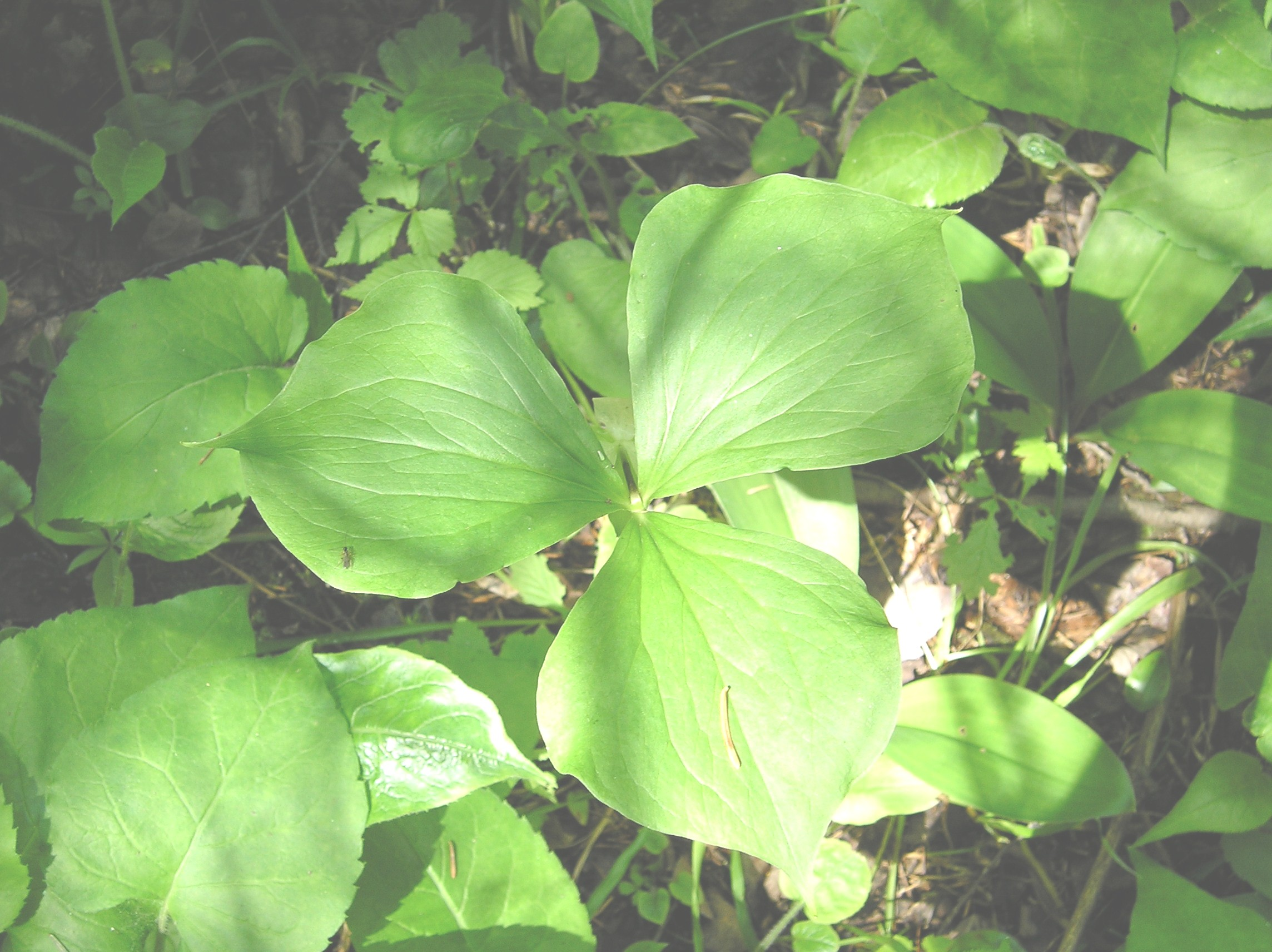
The perennial wildflower Trillium cernuum possesses three leaves that are sessile at the top of the stem.

In botany, sessility (meaning "sitting", in the sense of "resting on the surface") is a characteristic of plant organs such as flowers or leaves that have no stalk. Plant parts can also be described as subsessile, that is, not completely sessile.

A sessile flower is one that lacks a pedicel (flower stalk). A flower that is not sessile is pedicellate. For example, the genus Trillium is partitioned into multiple subgenera, the sessile-flowered trilliums (Trillium subgen. Sessilia) and the pedicellate-flowered trilliums.

The term "sessility" is also used in mycology to describe a fungal fruit body that is attached to or seated directly on the surface of the substrate, lacking a supporting stipe or pedicel.
