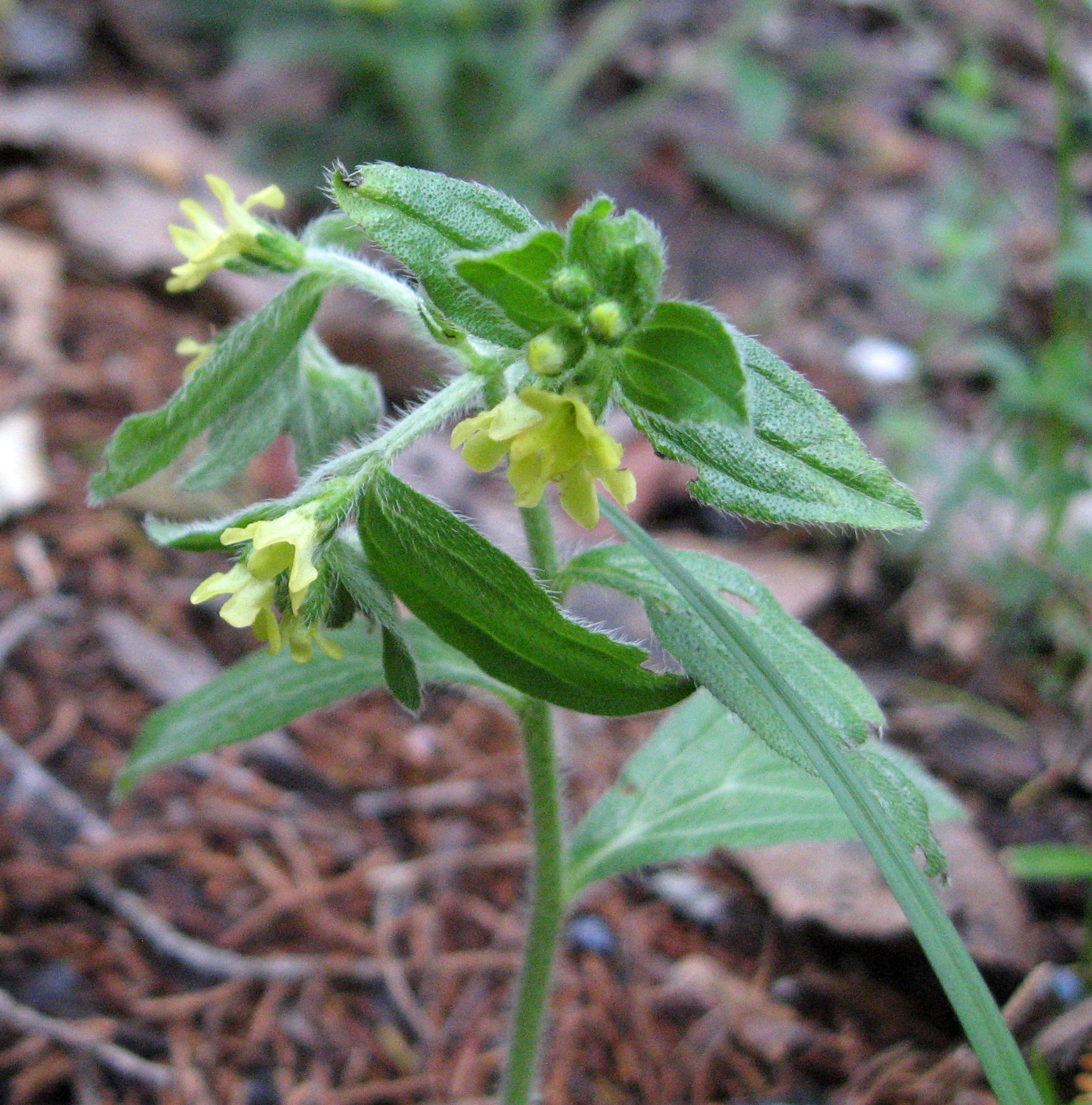

Conservation status
- Apparently Secure (NatureServe)

Scientific classification
- Kingdom: Plantae
- Clade: Embryophytes
- Clade: Tracheophytes
- Clade: Spermatophytes
- Clade: Angiosperms
- Clade: Eudicots
- Clade: Asterids
- Order: Boraginales
- Family: Boraginaceae
- Genus: Lithospermum
- Species: L. tuberosum

Binomial name
- Lithospermum tuberosum Rugel ex A.DC.

= Lithospermum tuberosum =

Species of flowering plant in the borage family

Lithospermum tuberosum, commonly called the southern stoneseed or tuberous stoneseed, is a species of flowering plant in the forget-me-not family. It is native to the Southeastern United States, where it is found in calcareous woodlands.

== Description ==
Lithospermum tuberosum produces a cyme of yellow flowers in spring. It is distinguished from the similar Lithospermum latifolium by having more obtuse leaves, which are clustered in a basal rosette as well as on the main stem.

== Taxonomy ==
Lithospermum tuberosum was first described in Volume 10 of Prodromus Systematis Naturalis Regni Vegetabilis. The volume was edited by Alphonse Pyramus de Candolle and published in 1846. In his description, de Candolle attributed the name to Ferdinand Rugel. As of December 2024, Lithospermum tuberosum Rugel ex A.DC. is a widely accepted name.

== Bibliography ==
- Candolle, Alphonse Pyramus de, ed. (1846). Prodromus Systematis Naturalis Regni Vegetabilis, Vol. 10.
