= Ferdinand Ignatius Xavier Rugel =

German-American botanist (1806-1879)

- Born: 17 December 1806; Baden-Württemberg, Germany
- Died: 31 January 1879 (aged 72); Jefferson County, Tennessee, U.S.
- Citizenship: Germany (by birth), United States (by marriage)
- Spouse: Laura Bell
- Scientific career
- Fields: pharmacy, botany
- Author abbrev. (botany): Rugel

Ferdinand Ignatius Xavier Rugel (17 December 1806 – 31 January 1879) was a German-born American pharmacist, botanist, and plant collector.

== Life ==
Ferdinand Rugel was born on 17 December 1806 in Wolfegg, a municipality in the district of Ravensburg in the state of Baden-Württemberg, Germany. He died on 31 January 1879 in Jefferson County, Tennessee, U.S. at the age of 72 years. He was buried at the Westminster Presbyterian Church Cemetery in the town of White Pine, Tennessee. The inscription on his gravestone states he was born on 24 December 1806 but that is in fact incorrect based on church records in Weingarten, a town about 12 kilometres (7.5 mi) from Wolfegg.

== Career ==
Rugel was a very active plant collector in both Europe and the United States. In Europe, he collected plant specimens in Switzerland, France, Spain, and Sicily. After emigrating to the United States in 1840, he collected widely throughout the southeastern United States during the period 1840–1848 under the direction of R.J. Shuttleworth. He also collected in Cuba in 1849, severing his ties with Shuttleworth during that same year. After 1850, he collected occasionally in Tennessee and Texas. In 1878, he collected in Travis County, Texas, but his collection trip was cut short by a case of boils (furunculosis).

== Legacy ==
Dozens of taxa have been named in honor of Ferdinand Rugel, including Rugelia nudicaulis, Plantago rugelii, and Trillium rugelii. In particular, the American botanist Alvan Wentworth Chapman described the monotypic genus Rugelia in 1860. In his description, Chapman attributed both the generic name Rugelia and the specific epithet nudicaulis to R.J. Shuttleworth. Most of the taxon names honoring Rugel were named by Shuttleworth, who generally left the descriptions to other botanists. Rugel himself named a handful of taxa, the best known being Lithospermum tuberosum Rugel ex A.DC.

== See also ==
- Ferdinand Rugel (German)

== Bibliography ==
- Chapman, Alvan Wentworth; Eaton, Daniel Cady (1865). Flora of the southern United States. New York: Ivison, Phinney & Co.
- Geiser, S. W. (1948). "Biographical note on Dr. Ferdinand Rugel, American botanist". Field and Laboratory. 16 (2): 113–119.
- Geiser, S. W. (1950). "Note: Birthplace of Ferdinand Rugel (1806-79), early southern botanist". Field and Laboratory. 18 (3): 112.
- Geiser, S. W. (1959). "Men of Science in Texas, 1820-1880: V". Field and Laboratory. 27 (4): 190.
- Stafleu, Frans A.; Cowan, Richard S. (1983). Taxonomic literature: a selective guide to botanical publications and collections with dates, commentaries and types: Taxon. Lit. (TL2). Vol. 4 (2nd ed.). Utrecht: Bohn, Scheltema & Holkema. ISBN 90-313-0224-4.
