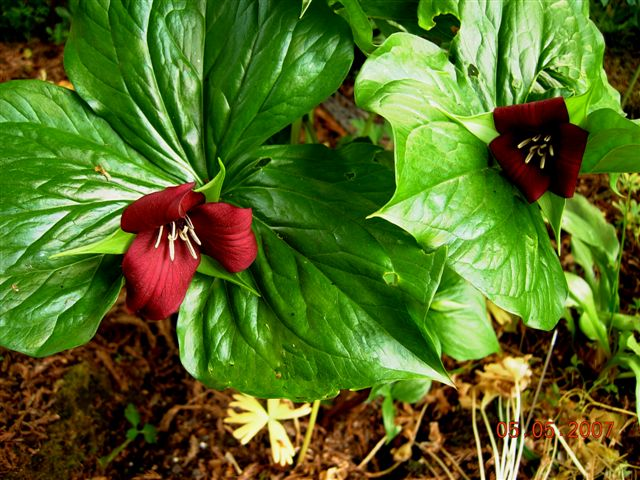

Conservation status
- Apparently Secure (NatureServe)

Scientific classification
- Kingdom: Plantae
- Clade: Tracheophytes
- Clade: Angiosperms
- Clade: Monocots
- Order: Liliales
- Family: Melanthiaceae
- Tribe: Parideae
- Genus: Trillium
- Species: T. sulcatum

Binomial name
- Trillium sulcatum T.S.Patrick

Synonyms
- T. sulcatum: Trillium erectum var. sulcatum Barksd.; Trillium sulcatum f. albolutescens T.S.Patrick

= Trillium sulcatum =

Species of flowering plant

Trillium sulcatum is a species of flowering plant in the bunchflower family Melanthiaceae. It is a member of the Erectum group, a group of species typified by Trillium erectum. The specific name sulcatum means "furrowed, grooved, or sulcate", which describes the tips of the sepals. It is most abundant on the Cumberland Plateau in central Tennessee and eastern Kentucky where it blooms in April and May. The species is commonly known as the southern red trillium or furrowed wakerobin.

== Description ==
Trillium sulcatum is a perennial, herbaceous, flowering plant that persists by means of an underground rhizome. Like all trilliums, it has a whorl of three bracts (leaves) and a single trimerous flower with three sepals, three petals, two whorls of three stamens each, and three carpels (fused into a single ovary with three stigmas). The flower sits atop a long stalk (called a pedicel) rising above the leaves. The recurved (bent backwards) petals are usually dark red but an occasional white form may be found. The berry is also red.

Trillium sulcatum is often confused with other members of the Trillium erectum group, including Trillium flexipes, Trillium simile, Trillium vaseyi, and especially Trillium erectum. In general, it is distinguished by the relative length of its pedicel. Specifically, the sepals of Trillium sulcatum are less than half as long as the pedicel, whereas they are more than half as long in other members of the group.

== Taxonomy ==
Trillium sulcatum was described and named by the American botanist Thomas Stewart Patrick in 1984. Its type specimen was collected in Grundy County, Tennessee in 1980. As of March 2023, the name Trillium sulcatum T.S.Patrick is widely recognized. The species is a member of the Erectum group, a group of species typified by Trillium erectum.

Related to this, Lane Barksdale described Trillium erectum var. sulcatum in 1938, but since he did not provide a Latin description, the name is invalid. However, the variety's type specimen, collected in Surry County, North Carolina in 1937, was subsequently identified as Trillium sulcatum, and so the epithet sulcatum was retained in recognition of Barksdale's contribution. Consequently, Trillium sulcatum is often referred to as the Barksdale trillium.

== Distribution and habitat ==
Trillium sulcatum is most abundant on the Cumberland Plateau, from northeastern Alabama and northwestern Georgia northward through central Tennessee into eastern Kentucky. From Tennessee its range extends northeastward into Virginia and, via the New River drainage, into both West Virginia and North Carolina. Unlike other members of the Trillium erectum complex, it is notably absent from the Great Smoky Mountains and the southern Blue Ridge Mountains.

Trillium sulcatum is known to occur in the following counties:

- Alabama: DeKalb, Jackson, Marshall
- Georgia: Dade, Walker
- Kentucky: Bell, Carter, Casey, Harlan, Laurel, Lee, Madison, McCreary, Morgan, Perry, Powell, Pulaski, Rockcastle, Wayne, Whitley
- North Carolina: Alleghany, Ashe, Caldwell, Surry, Watauga, Wilkes
- Tennessee: Anderson, Bledsoe, Campbell, Claiborne, Coffee, Cumberland, DeKalb, Fentress, Franklin, Grundy, Hamblen, Hamilton, Hancock, Hawkins, Johnson, Knox, Lincoln, Marion, Morgan, Pickett, Putnam, Rhea, Roane, Scott, Sequatchie, Sullivan, Van Buren, Warren, White
- Virginia: Buchanon, Carroll, Dickenson, Floyd, Franklin, Giles, Grayson, Henry, Lee, Montgomery, Patrick, Pulaski, Roanoke, Russell, Scott, Smyth, Tazewell, Washington, Wise, Wythe
- West Virginia: Fayette, McDowell, Mercer

== Conservation ==
NatureServe considers the global conservation status of Trillium sulcatum to be apparently secure (G4). At the southern edge of its range, it is imperiled (S2) in Georgia and critically imperiled (S1) in Alabama.

== Bibliography ==
- Barksdale, Lane (1938). "The pedicellate species of Trillium found in the southern Appalachians". Journal of the Elisha Mitchell Scientific Society. 54 (2): 271–296. JSTOR 24332541.
- Case, Frederick W.; Case, Roberta B. (1997). Trilliums. Portland, Oregon: Timber Press. ISBN 978-0-88192-374-2.
- Lampley, Jayne A.; Gereau, Roy; Floden, Aaron; Schilling, Edward E. (2022-07-05). "A revised subgeneric classification of Trillium (Parideae, Melanthiaceae)". Phytotaxa. 552 (5): 278–286. Bibcode:2022Phytx.552..278L. doi:10.11646/phytotaxa.552.5.1. S2CID 250368253.
- Patrick, Thomas S. (1984). "Trillium sulcatum (Liliaceae), a New Species of the Southern Appalachians". Brittonia. 36 (1). New York Botanical Garden: 26–36. Bibcode:1984Britt..36...26P. doi:10.2307/2806287. JSTOR 2806287. S2CID 85116255.
