= Botanical specimen =

Plant material preserved for scientific uses

A preserved botanical specimen of Kalmia angustifolia collected and illustrated by Elsie May Kittredge in 1917.

A botanical specimen, also called a plant specimen, is a biological specimen of a plant (or part of a plant) used for scientific purposes. Preserved collections of algae, fungi, slime molds, and other organisms traditionally studied by botanists are also considered to be botanical specimens. Plant specimens are usually preserved by drying and pressing using a basic technique that is more than 500 years old. Other examples of preserved specimens include loose seeds, wood sections, and microscope slides. A facility devoted to the curation of a collection of botanical specimens is known as a herbarium.

A person who gathers botanical specimens is called a botanical collector (or plant collector). Plant collecting is an essential botanical activity with a very long history. Some plant science journals require botanical specimens as a condition for publication of articles.

== Terminology ==
The terms herbarium specimen, voucher specimen, and type specimen refer to botanical specimens with a particular use or quality.

=== Herbarium specimen ===
The term herbarium specimen emphasizes the fact that a botanical specimen has been deposited in a herbarium, an institution specifically designed to facilitate the sharing of preserved specimens. A herbarium specimen is usually dried, pressed, and mounted on paper but other methods of preservation are used as well.

A voucher specimen is a herbarium specimen intended to support a research project or a field survey. Among other things, vouchers help to protect against errors in plant identification.

=== Type specimen ===
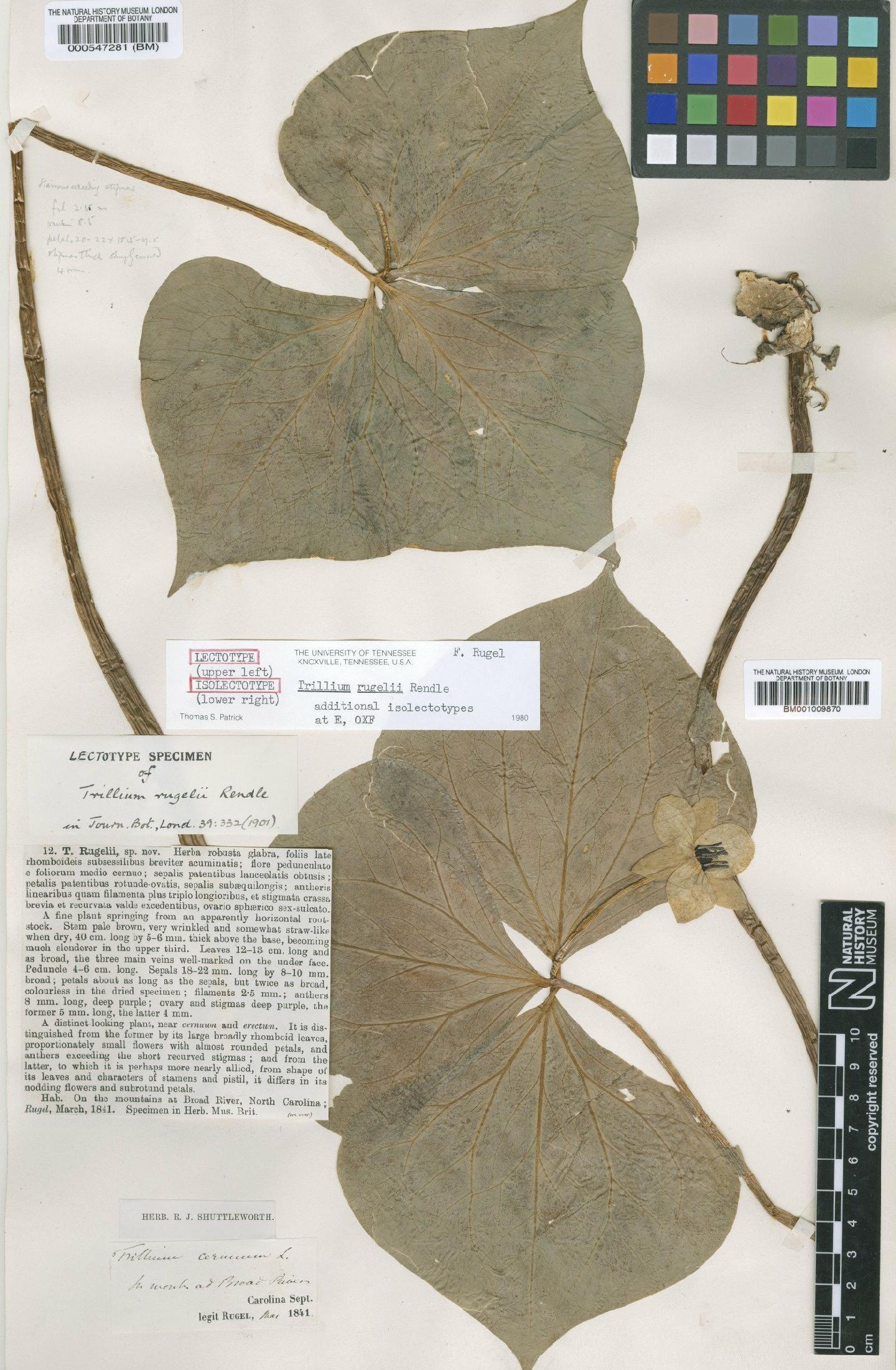
Specimen BM001009870 Trillium rugelii Rendle collected by Ferdinand Rugel in 1841

To be useful, a botanical specimen must be identified as a member of some taxonomic group at a given rank. Whether or not the collector identifies the specimen initially, other botanists are free to make a determination at any time. If a specimen is believed to represent a new taxon, a botanist may publish a new name and description, in which case they become the author of the name and the specimen becomes the type of the taxon. Every plant species is associated with a type, either a botanical specimen or a botanical illustration. In either case the type serves as the basis for the botanical name of the taxon.

In 1841, the American botanist Ferdinand Rugel collected two specimens, one in North Carolina and the other in Georgia. The English botanist Alfred Barton Rendle published new names and descriptions for both specimens in 1901. Rendle applied the names Trillium rugelii and Trillium affine, respectively. In the 1980s, the American botanist Thomas Stewart Patrick determined that both specimens represented a single species.

In the previous scenario, Rugel is the collector, Rendle is the author, and Patrick is the determiner. Obviously Rendle and Patrick disagree but anyone can inspect the specimens, read the descriptions, and formulate an opinion: either there are two distinct species, Trillium rugelii Rendle and Trillium affine Rendle, or the name Trillium affine Rendle is a synonym for Trillium rugelii Rendle. As of June 2023, botanists favor a single species concept. Future opinion might change but in any case, Trillium affine Rendle is still a validly named and described species, and its type is the specimen collected by Rugel in Georgia in 1841.

== Famous collectors ==
Typically a botanical specimen is preserved and deposited in a herbarium. In the 16th century, the Italian botanist Luca Ghini collected plant specimens throughout the Mediterranean region. After his specimens were dried and pressed, he attached them to pieces of cardboard and shared them with other botanists. In so doing, Ghini created the first herbarium. Traditionally botanists have maintained personal herbaria (some still do) but today specimens are usually deposited in an institutional herbarium to facilitate sharing and ensure long-term availability. In many respects, a herbarium (for plants) is analogous to a library (for books).

The Swedish botanist Peter Kalm came to North America in 1748 on behalf of Carl Linnaeus, the renowned Swedish botanist. Kalm made a large collection of plant specimens that he gave to Linnaeus upon his return to Europe in 1751. In his Species Plantarum published in 1753, Linnaeus named and described dozens of new plant species based on Kalm's specimens. For example, Linnaeus established the genus Kalmia by naming and describing two new species, Kalmia angustifolia and Kalmia latifolia. The generic name Kalmia honors the contributions of Peter Kalm.

== Darwin Core ==
To facilitate the sharing of information on biological diversity (biodiversity), the Global Biodiversity Information Facility (GBIF) and other projects organize biodiversity data according to the Darwin Core standard. GBIF consolidates and shares information about botanical specimens from institutional herbaria around the world. Using Darwin Core, GBIF records occurrences of taxa in nature via observations, specimens, and samples. Types of specimens include living specimens, preserved specimens, and fossil specimens. In the language of Darwin Core, a plant specimen includes some tangible (physical) evidence of a plant occurrence in nature. By that definition, photographs, videos, and audio recordings are not specimens. In particular, a photograph of a plant is an observation, not a specimen.

== See also ==
- Author citation (botany)
- Botanical expeditions
- Plant collecting
- Zoological specimen

== Bibliography ==
- Chase, Mark W.; Hills, Harold H. (May 1991). "Silica Gel: An Ideal Material for Field Preservation of Leaf Samples for DNA Studies". Taxon. 40 (2): 215–220. doi:10.2307/1222975. JSTOR 1222975.
- Culley, Theresa M. (October 2013). "Why vouchers matter in botanical research". Applications in Plant Sciences. 1 (11). Bibcode:2013AppPS...100076C. doi:10.3732/apps.1300076. PMC 4103463. PMID 25202501.
- Isely, Duane (2002). One Hundred and One Botanists. West Lafayette, Indiana: Purdue University Press. pp. 20–22. ISBN 978-1-55753-283-1. OCLC 947193619.
- Floden, Aaron; Knapp, Wesley (June 2023). "Typification of the North American species of Trillium subg. Trillium (Melanthiaceae: Parideae)". Phytotaxa. 599 (3): 193–200. Bibcode:2023Phytx.599..193F. doi:10.11646/phytotaxa.599.3.6.
- Linnaeus, Carl (1753). Species Plantarum: exhibentes plantas rite cognitas, ad genera relatas, cum differentiis specificis, nominibus trivialibus, synonymis selectis, locis natalibus, secundum systema sexuale digestas (1st ed.). Stockholm: Impensis Laurentii Salvii.
- Rendle, A. B. (1901). "Notes on Trillium". Journal of Botany, British and Foreign. 39. London: 321–356.
