= Robert J. Shuttleworth =

English botanist and malacologist

- Born: 1810; Dawlish, England
- Died: 18 April 1874 (aged 63–64); Hyères, France
- Citizenship: United Kingdom
- Spouse(s): Susette, daughter of the Count de Sury of Soleure
- Scientific career
- Fields: Malacology
- Author abbrev. (botany): Shuttlew.
- Author abbrev. (zoology): Shuttlew.

Robert James Shuttleworth (February 1810 – 18 April 1874) was an English botanist and malacologist.

== Life ==
Shuttleworth was born in Dawlish, Devonshire, the eldest son of James Shuttleworth (died 1846) of Barton Lodge, Preston, Lancashire, by his first wife, Anna Maria, daughter of Richard Henry Roper, dean of Clonmacnoise. His mother died of consumption a few weeks after his birth. His father married again in 1815, and settled in Switzerland, subsequently (in 1834) selling the Barton property. Shuttleworth, who was mainly brought up by his mother's relatives, was sent to school at Geneva, first under Rodolphe Töpffer, and afterwards under the botanist Nicolas Charles Seringe, keeper of the De Candolle Herbarium. He studied plants on the mountains near Geneva.

At age 17 Shuttleworth went to Germany, passing a winter at Saxe-Weimar, where he saw court life and came to know Goethe. He spent some time at Frankfurt and Heidelberg, before his father recalled him to Solothurn; there the family were then living, fearing he might become too burschikos. Shuttleworth maintained his devotion to botany, and made a considerable collection in the Jura during the summer of 1830. From the autumn of that year until the end of 1832 he studied in the medical faculty of the University of Edinburgh, walking the hospital during the first outbreak of cholera, making a vacation tour in the Scottish highlands, and helping his elder stepbrother Blake on his estate at Renville in the west of Ireland during the famine of 1831 and 1832.

On 11 January 1833 Shuttleworth was appointed to a captaincy in the Duke of Lancaster's own regiment by the lord-lieutenant of the county (Whittle, Preston, 1837, ii. 235), but, returning to Solothurn in the following winter, he married Susette, daughter of the Count de Sury of Soleure, and settled at Bern. They had two children, his son Henry, and a daughter who died at the age of seven.

Here Shuttleworth collected on the Grimsel and the Oberland, and worked particularly on red snow and other freshwater algae, until weakness of the eyes compelled him to abandon the microscope. In 1835 he purchased the extensive herbarium and library of Joseph August Schultes of Zürich, the botanical collaborator of Johan Jacob Roemer. Between 1840 and 1850 he became intimate with Jean de Charpentier of Bex, a zealous botanist who had taken to conchology. Charpentier temporarily inspired Shuttleworth with his own zeal for his new subject. Shuttleworth spent money freely on his researches, sending, at his expense, the collector Blauner of Bern to Corsica, the Canaries, and ultimately to Puerto Rico, where he died of consumption. Rugel, a very active collector in North America, and other travellers in Mexico, Peru, Bolivia, and Brazil were also largely supported by Shuttleworth, who bought their collections of shells, plants, seeds, &c. The plants he partly worked out, thus forming a very extensive and valuable annotated herbarium.

Shuttleworth usually wintered in the south, owing to his tendency to gout, and, despite frequent disablement, ransacked the rich botanical hunting-ground of Var and Alpes-Maritimes. This resulted in a herbarium, formed jointly by several friends, now in the possession of M. Edmond Huet at Pamiers (Ariège), and in a Catalogue des Plantes de Provence, which was published by M. A. Huet at Pamiers in 1889. Many of his botanical discoveries were in part due to his constant comparison of French with Italian types, while his letters to his friends Meissner, Godet, Guthnick, and others, and the notes in his herbarium evince the critical caution which made him apt in botany, as in conchology, to insist on minute differences. In 1866 his only son Henry, a promising student of medicine at Cambridge and London, died, aged 22, at his summer residence, Frohberg, near Bern. Overwhelmed with grief, Shuttleworth removed to Hyères, and gave up scientific work. He died on 19 April 1874.

Shuttleworth joined the Botanical Society of Edinburgh as an original member in 1836, became a fellow of the Linnean Society in 1856, and was also an associate of the Zoological Society and of the Lyceum of New York. The University of Basle conferred a doctor's degree upon him for his services to science, and Meissner commemorated him in the genus Shuttleworthia, now merged in Verbena. His collection of shells, considered by Mousson (Journal de Conchyliologie, xxiii. 99) one of the most remarkable in Europe, was presented after his death to the State Museum at Bern, and his herbarium of more than 150,000 specimens of flowering plants and twenty thousand cryptogams was added to the British Museum collection. An account of the various collections comprised in this herbarium appears in the official report of the department of botany in the museum for 1877 (Journal of Botany, 1878, pp. 179–80).

== Works ==
Besides an Account of a Botanical Excursion in the Alps of Valais in Jardine's Magazine of Zoology and Botany for 1835 (vol. ii.), the Royal Society's Catalogue enumerates eighteen papers by Shuttleworth, beginning with a description in German of some North American species of Valerianella in Flora, vol. xx. (1837), including several contributions, mostly malacological, to the Mittheilungen d. Naturf. Gesellschaft of Bern, and ending with an Essai critique sur quelques espèces du genre Cyclostoma in the Journal de Conchyliologie for 1856 (vol. i.). Some of these papers deal with the land and fresh-water shells of Corsica, the Canaries, and the West Indies; others with the formation of loess. He also published separately: 1. Nouvelles observations sur la matière coloriante de la neige rouge, Geneva, 1840; and 2. Notitiæ Malacologicæ, Heft i., Bern, 1856, dedicated to Jean de Charpentier, and consisting of an introduction on classification and nomenclature (pp. 1–29), and a monograph of five little known genera of land-shells (pp. 30–90), most of the species being described as new, with nine lithographic plates, eight of which are unsigned, and presumably by the author, the last by A. Hutter. The second part of this work, which is written in German, was issued in 1878, and consists of fifteen plates, coloured by Shuttleworth, put on stone by Hutter, with descriptions by Shuttleworth, edited with synonymy by Dr. Paul Fischer, with a preface by Professor T. Studer and a Nekrolog von R. J. Shuttleworth, by Shuttleworth's friend Guthnick, director of the Bern Botanical Garden.
