= Thomas Stewart Patrick =

American botanist (1944–2019)

- Born: December 5, 1944; Geneva, New York, U.S.
- Died: August 22, 2019 (aged 74); Macon, Georgia, U.S.
- Occupation: Botanist
- Employer: Georgia Department of Natural Resources
- Spouse: Bretta Elaine Perkins

Thomas Stewart Patrick (December 5, 1944 – August 22, 2019) was an American botanist.

== Career ==
Tom Patrick joined the Georgia Department of Natural Resources in 1986. He was the agency's first botanist.

== Selected publications ==
- Patrick, Thomas S. (1984). "Trillium sulcatum (Liliaceae), a New Species of the Southern Appalachians". Brittonia. 36 (1). New York Botanical Garden: 26–36. doi:10.2307/2806287. JSTOR 2806287. S2CID 85116255.
- Patrick, Thomas S. (November 1987). "'…as if that sky let fall a flower from its cerulean wall'". Tipularia. 2 (1): 18–19.
