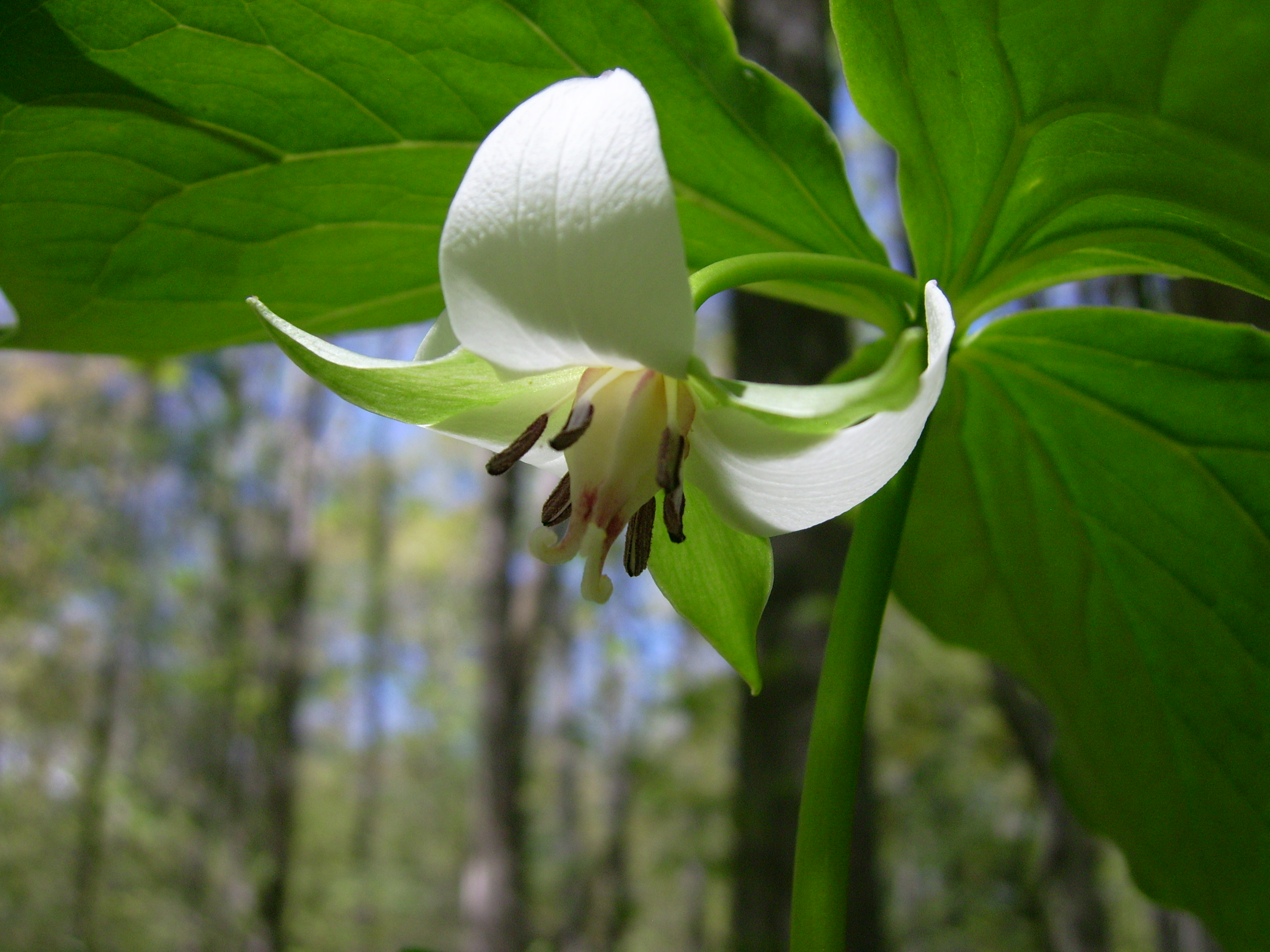
- With flower in Ontario (10 June)

Conservation status
- Least Concern (IUCN 3.1)

- Secure (NatureServe)

Scientific classification
- Kingdom: Plantae
- Clade: Tracheophytes
- Clade: Angiosperms
- Clade: Monocots
- Order: Liliales
- Family: Melanthiaceae
- Genus: Trillium
- Species: T. cernuum

Binomial name
- Trillium cernuum L.

Synonyms
- List: Trillium cernuum f. billingtonii Farw.; Trillium cernuum var. declinatum Farw.; Trillium cernuum f. lalondei Cay. & J.Cay.; Trillium cernuum var. macranthum Eames & Wiegand; Trillium cernuum f. marginatum Cay. & J.Cay.; Trillium cernuum f. tangerae Wherry; Trillium cernuum var. terrae-novae B.Boivin; Trillium cernuum var. typicum Wherry; Trillium cernuum f. viride Cay. & J.Cay.; Trillium cernuum f. walpolei Farw.; Trillium glaucum Raf.; Trillium hamosum Raf.; Trillium latifolium Raf.; Trillium medium Raf.

= Trillium cernuum =

Species of flowering plant

Trillium cernuum is a species of flowering plant in the bunchflower family Melanthiaceae. The specific epithet cernuum means "drooping, curving forwards, facing downwards", a distinctive habit of its flower. It is commonly called nodding trillium or nodding wakerobin (not to be confused with Trillium flexipes) since the flower is invariably found nodding beneath the leaves. It is sometimes referred to as the northern nodding trillium to distinguish from Trillium rugelii, a similar nodding species native to the southern Appalachian Mountains. It is also called the whip-poor-will flower, since presumably its bloom coincides with the spring arrival of the migrating bird with the same name.

Trillium cernuum was thought to be one of three species of Trillium described by Swedish botanist Carl Linnaeus in 1753 (the other two being Trillium erectum and Trillium sessile). The specimen examined by Linnaeus was actually Trillium catesbaei, a nodding species native to the southern Appalachian Mountains where Trillium cernuum does not occur. This oversight led to much confusion, some of which continues to this day. Within its natural range, Trillium cernuum is often confused with two closely related Trillium species, Trillium erectum and Trillium flexipes. The three species are known to interbreed with one another, which adds to the confusion.

The nodding trillium is the most northerly Trillium species in North America, occurring as far north as Hudson Bay and as far south as northern Virginia (reports south of Virginia are most likely other species such as Trillium rugelii, Trillium catesbaei, or Trillium flexipes). Trillium cernuum is found on rich, moist soils in both broadleaf and coniferous woodlands.

== Description ==
Trillium cernuum is a perennial herbaceous plant that spreads by means of an underground rhizome. Up to three scapes (stems) rise directly from the rhizome, each standing 15–40 cm (6–16 in) tall. At the apex of the scape is a whorl of three leaf-like bracts, each 5–15 cm (2.0–5.9 in) long and 6–15 cm (2.4–5.9 in) wide.

Flowering occurs from late April to early June, possibly as late as July in the northern part of its range. A solitary flower hangs below the bracts (leaves) on a short recurved pedicel 1.5–3 cm (0.6–1.2 in) long. The flower has three slender pale green sepals, each 9–30 mm (0.4–1.2 in) long, and three strongly recurved white (rarely pink) petals, each 15–25 mm (0.6–1.0 in) long and 5–15 mm (0.2–0.6 in) wide. The flower is bisexual with six stamens and a single white (or pink) ovary shaped like a pyramid. Each stamen consists of a thin white filament and a pale lavender-pink (or gray) anther. The filaments and anthers are about the same length.

If the flower is successfully pollinated, a single fruit develops. Initially the fruit is white (or pink), ripening to a dark red by late summer. When ripe, the fruit is a plump six-lobed berry up to 3 cm (1.2 in) in diameter.

Trillium cernuum
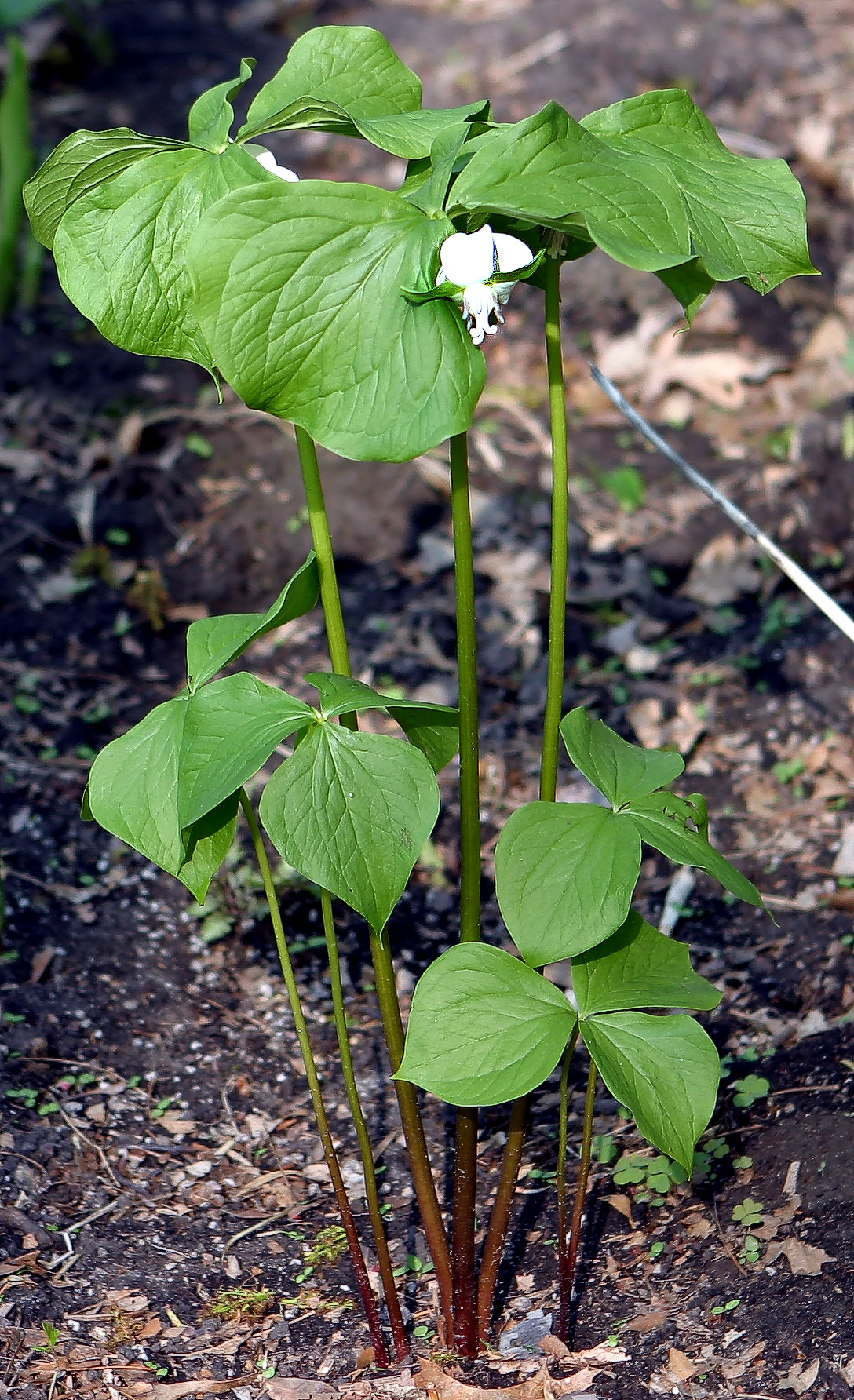
A clump in Minnesota (17 May)

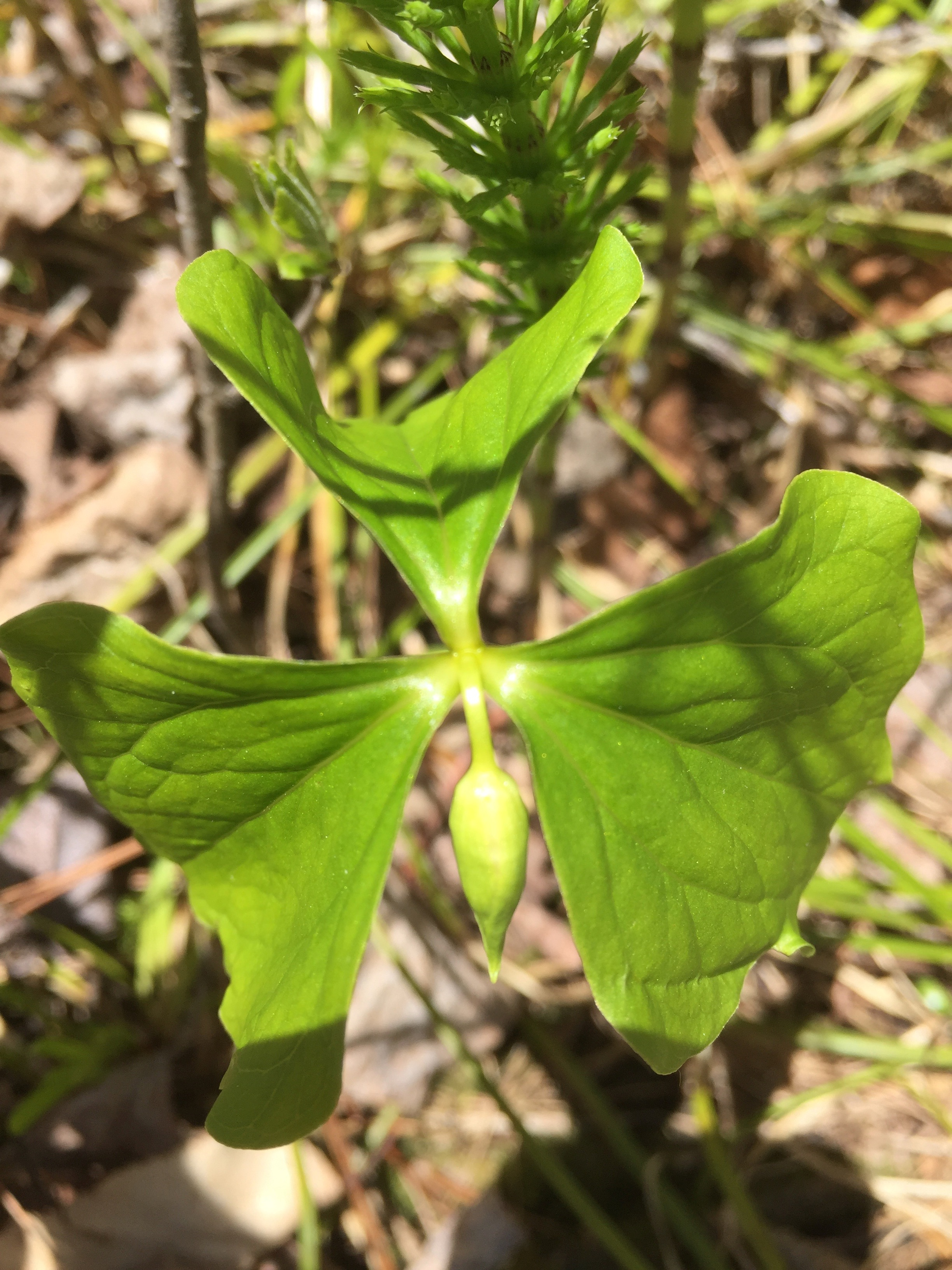
With flower bud in Vermont (14 May)

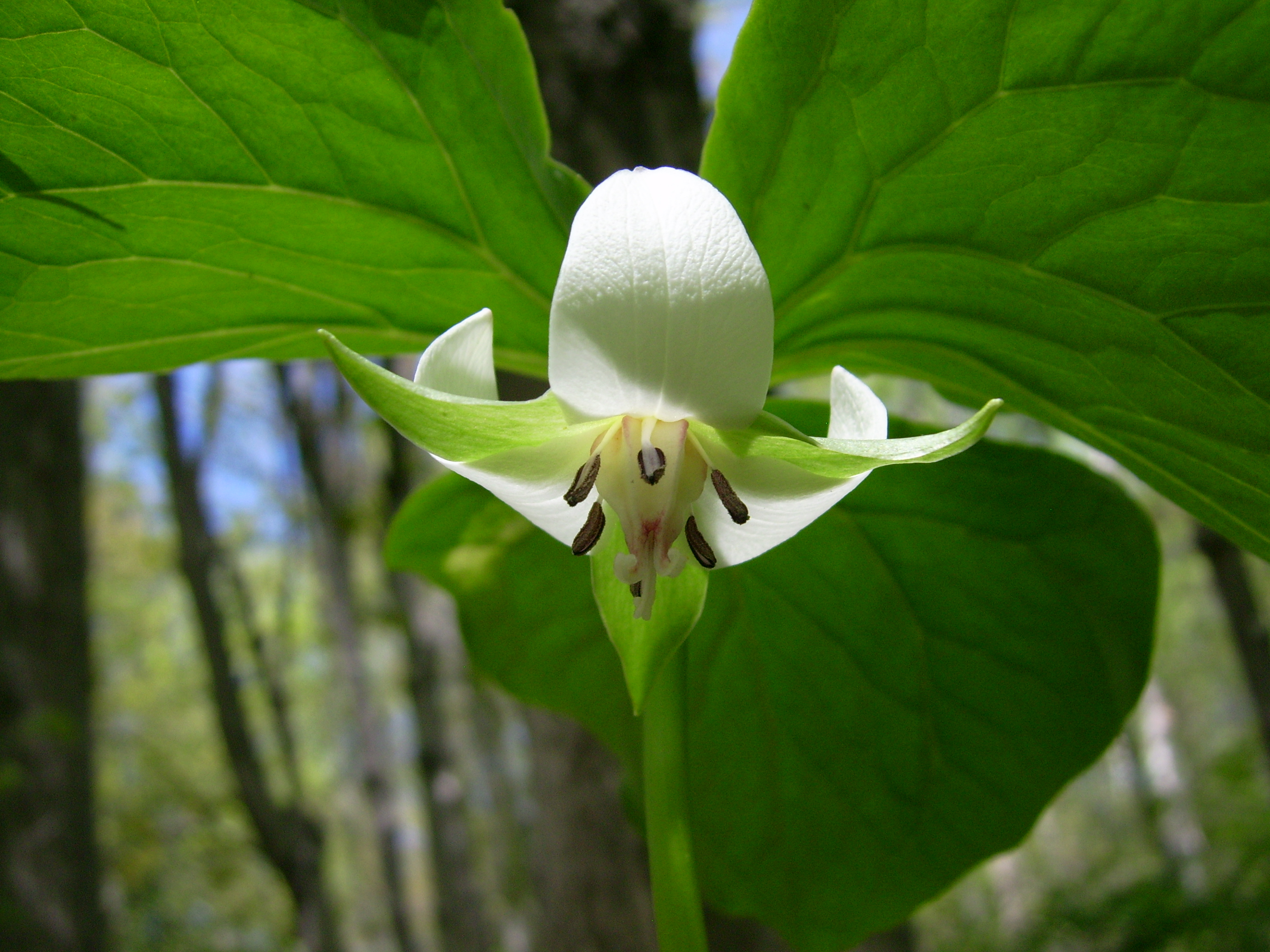
With flower in Ontario (10 June)

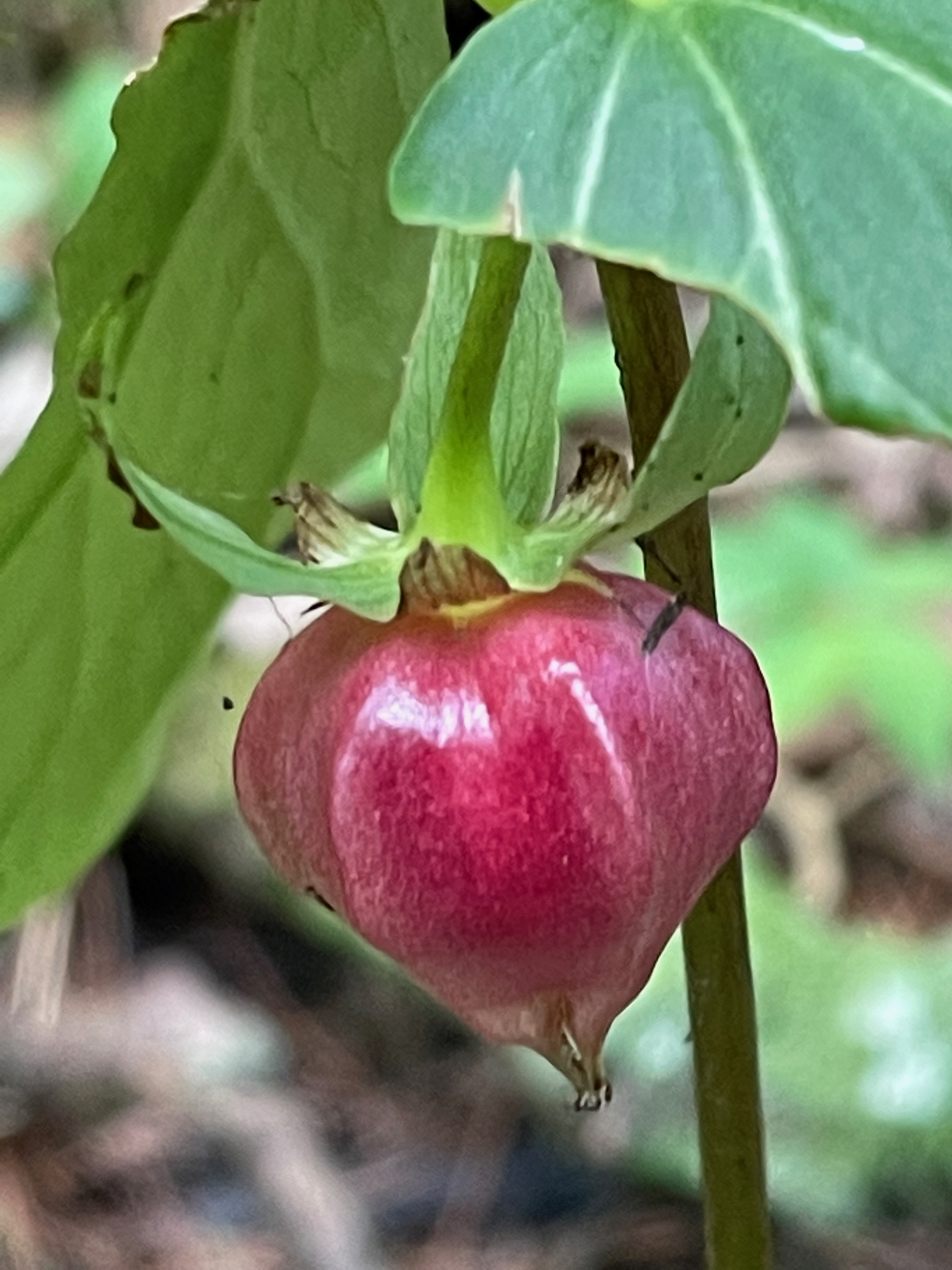
With fruit in Vermont (31 July)

Historically, Trillium cernuum has been confused with several nodding Trillium species native to the southern Appalachian Mountains. (See the Taxonomy section for more background information.) Within its natural range, T. cernuum is often confused with two sympatric Trillium species, T. erectum and T. flexipes. The following table compares these three species character by character while emphasizing the important characteristics of T. cernuum:

Lookalike species
	T. erectum (red trillium)	T. cernuum (nodding trillium)	T. flexipes (drooping trillium)
Stem	One or more per rhizome, clumps common; 1.5–6 dm (5.9–23.6 in) long	1–2(–3) per rhizome, each 1.5–4 dm (5.9–15.7 in) long	One or more per rhizome, each 2–5 dm (7.9–19.7 in) long
Leaves	Sessile, rhombic to ovate-rhombic; 5–20 cm (2.0–7.9 in) long and wide, widest near the middle	Sessile or subsessile with narrow leaf bases; 5–15 cm (2.0–5.9 in) long and 6–15 cm (2.4–5.9 in) wide	Sessile, rhombic; 15–25 mm (0.6–1.0 in) long and wide, often wider than long
Pedicel	Various habits but not recurved below the leaves; 1–10 cm (0.4–3.9 in) long	Short and strongly recurved below the leaves; 1.5–3 cm (0.6–1.2 in) long	Various habits but rarely recurved below the leaves; 4–12 cm (1.6–4.7 in) long
Flower	Usually faces downward; smells like a wet dog	Nodding below the leaves	Erect forms face outward
Sepals	Green, often streaked with maroon; 10–50 mm (0.4–2.0 in) long	Green; 9–30 mm (0.4–1.2 in) long	Green, weakly recurved; 14–45 mm (0.6–1.8 in) long
Petals	Dark reddish brown, maroon, purple, or white; heavily textured; 15–50 mm (0.6–2.0 in) long and 10–30 mm (0.4–1.2 in) wide	White (rarely pink), strongly recurved; thin textured; 15–25 mm (0.6–1.0 in) long and 9–15 mm (0.4–0.6 in) wide	Creamy white, dark reddish brown, or maroon; heavily textured; 20–50 mm (0.8–2.0 in) long and 10–40 mm (0.4–1.6 in) wide
Stamens	Anthers dark maroon, gray-maroon, or yellow with pollen; filaments as long as (or longer) than the anthers	Anthers pale lavender-pink or gray; filaments and anthers approximately equal in length	Anthers thick, creamy white or yellow; anthers at least twice as long as the filaments
Ovary	Dark purple or maroon; ovoid to spherical; strongly ridged	White or pink flushed; flask-shaped; ridged	White or pink flushed; flask-shaped; strongly ridged
Fruit	(same as ovary)	White or pink initially, but ripens to dark red; ridges become angles as the fruit expands	White or pink initially, but ripens to rosy red or purplish; strongly angled

Identification typically requires a mature, flowering plant. When not in flower, the three species are difficult to distinguish. Moreover, the three species are known to interbreed with one another, which can add to the confusion.

To distinguish among T. cernuum, T. erectum, and T. flexipes, start by examining the pedicel. If the pedicel is longer than 3 cm (1.2 in), it is not T. cernuum. More importantly, the pedicel of T. cernuum is strongly recurved below the leaves while the other two species rarely exhibit this behavior.

Northern forms of T. flexipes tend to have recurved pedicels and/or recurved petals. These forms closely resemble large plants of T. cernuum and so the two are often confused. In such cases, examine the stamens. The anthers of T. cernuum are slender, lavender-pink or purplish, with the anthers and filaments approximately equal in length, while the anthers of T. flexipes are thick, creamy white or yellow, with the anthers greatly exceeding the length of the usually very short filaments.

== Taxonomy ==
Trillium cernuum was first thought to be described by Carl Linnaeus in 1753. Linnaeus gave the location of his type specimen as "Carolina" but T. cernuum (in the modern sense) does not range that far south. The resulting confusion surrounding the pedicellate-flowered Trillium species persisted for 150 years. In 1906, Gleason shed some light on the confusion by showing how to distinguish T. cernuum from T. flexipes on the basis of anther-filament ratio. However, Gleason mistakenly believed that the range of T. cernuum extended south to Georgia. Finally, in 1938, Barksdale showed conclusively that the specimen described by Linnaeus was actually T. catesbaei and that T. cernuum is absent from the southern Appalachian Mountains.

As of September 2021, Plants of the World Online (POWO) lists 14 synonyms for T. cernuum. Although POWO accepts no infraspecific names, numerous varieties and forms have been described. For example, Eames and Wiegand described T. cernuum var. macranthum in 1923. The typical variety, found along the North American coast from Delaware to Newfoundland, is described as a small delicate plant, while variety macranthum, found elsewhere, is claimed to be larger and more robust. Although there may be regional size trends, much of the variation in size is largely dependent upon soil nutrients, and so the variety is not generally accepted by botanists.

Edgar T. Wherry (1885-1982) described Trillium cernuum f. tangerae in 1945. With deep rose-colored petals, the form is thought to be a hybrid with T. erectum.

== Distribution and habitat ==
The range of Trillium cernuum extends across Canada, from Saskatchewan in the west to Newfoundland in the east, and as far south as northern Virginia in the mid-Atlantic United States. The species is known to occur in the following provinces, states, and territories:

- Canada: Manitoba, New Brunswick, Newfoundland and Labrador, Nova Scotia, Ontario, Prince Edward Island, Quebec, Saskatchewan
- United States: Connecticut, Delaware, District of Columbia, Illinois, Indiana, Iowa, Maine, Maryland, Massachusetts, Michigan, Minnesota, New Hampshire, New Jersey, New York, North Dakota, Ohio, Pennsylvania, Rhode Island, South Dakota, Vermont, Virginia, West Virginia, Wisconsin
- France: Saint Pierre and Miquelon

At the southern end of its range, T. cernuum grows in rich, cool, moist to swampy deciduous woods, and along shrubby stream banks and pond edges of deep forests. In Michigan, it also occurs along streams and swamps, but in conifer-hardwood forests. In its northern range, it occurs in dryer (although still moist), upland deciduous-coniferous woods.

As of October 2019, T. cernuum is globally secure. It is vulnerable (or worse) in at least a dozen states and provinces. In particular, it is critically imperiled in Illinois, Indiana, and West Virginia. In Lake County, Ohio, a single specimen was collected in 1879, but T. cernuum is now thought to be extirpated from Ohio.

== Bibliography ==
- Barksdale, Lane (1938). "The pedicellate species of Trillium found in the southern Appalachians". Journal of the Elisha Mitchell Scientific Society. 54 (2): 271–296. JSTOR 24332541.
- Case, Frederick W.; Case, Roberta B. (1997). Trilliums. Portland, Oregon: Timber Press. pp. 88–92. ISBN 978-0-88192-374-2.
