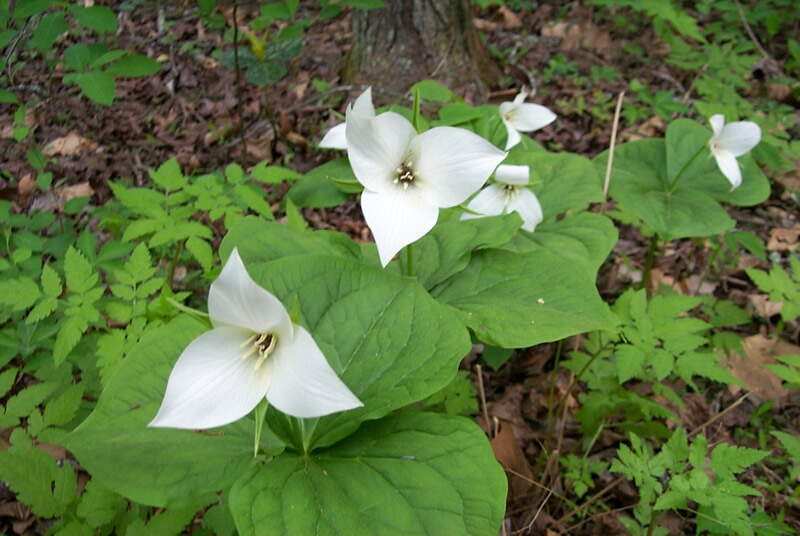

Conservation status
- Vulnerable (NatureServe)

Scientific classification
- Kingdom: Plantae
- Clade: Tracheophytes
- Clade: Angiosperms
- Clade: Monocots
- Order: Liliales
- Family: Melanthiaceae
- Genus: Trillium
- Species: T. simile

Binomial name
- Trillium simile Gleason
- U.S. distribution of Trillium simile

Synonyms
- Homotypic synonyms: Trillium erectum f. simile (Gleason) H.E.Ahles; Trillium vaseyi var. simile (Gleason) Barksd.

= Trillium simile =

Jeweled wakerobin

Species of flowering plant

Trillium simile, the jeweled wakerobin, is a species of flowering plant in the family Melanthiaceae. It is endemic to the southeastern United States. It is also known as sweet white wake-robin, sweet white trillium and confusing trillium.

== Description ==
Trillium simile is a spring-flowering perennial plant.

== Taxonomy ==
Trillium simile was described by Henry A. Gleason in 1906.

== Distribution and habitat ==
Trillium simile is endemic to the southeastern United States. It occurs in the southern Appalachian Mountains in the U.S. states of Tennessee, Georgia, North, and South Carolina. It prefers moist humus-rich soils at the edges of Rhododendron thickets in mature forests. It is found at elevations of 500–700 meters (1,600–2,300 feet).

== Bibliography ==
- Gleason, Henry Allan (July 1906). "The pedunculate species of Trillium". Bulletin of the Torrey Botanical Club. 33 (7): 387–396. doi:10.2307/2478819. hdl:2027/hvd.32044106472392. JSTOR 2478819.
