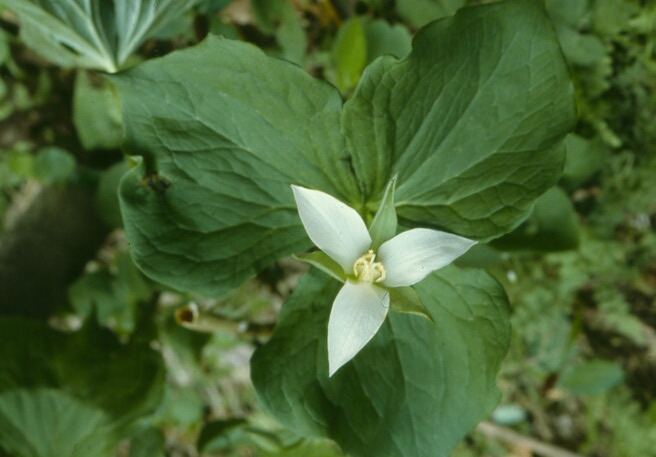

Conservation status
- Secure (NatureServe)

Scientific classification
- Kingdom: Plantae
- Clade: Tracheophytes
- Clade: Angiosperms
- Clade: Monocots
- Order: Liliales
- Family: Melanthiaceae
- Genus: Trillium
- Species: T. flexipes

Binomial name
- Trillium flexipes Raf.

Synonyms
- Trillium declinatum Gleason 1906, nom. illeg.; Trillium declinatum f. walpolei Friesner; Trillium flexipes f. walpolei (Farw.) Fernald; Trillium gleasonii Fernald

= Trillium flexipes =

Species of flowering plant

Trillium flexipes, known as the nodding wakerobin, bent trillium, or drooping trillium, is a species of flowering plant in the family Melanthiaceae. It is found from Minnesota to Ohio, south to Tennessee, with isolated (and sometimes rare) populations in New York, Pennsylvania, Alabama, and other states. It is an endangered species in Ontario and threatened in North Carolina.

== Description ==
T. flexipes is a perennial herbaceous plant that spreads by means of underground rhizomes. In northern areas, the flower tends to hang below the leaves, while central and southern strains have a large erect flower. The flower petals are normally white but can be reddish or maroon. The fruit is rosy red to purplish and fragrant of ripe fruit.

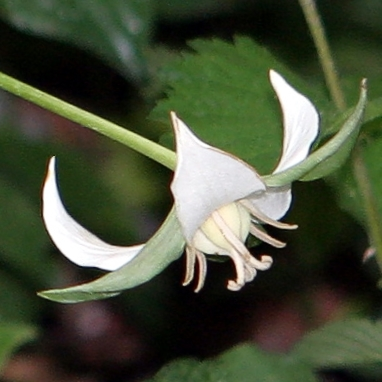
Typical flower with white petals

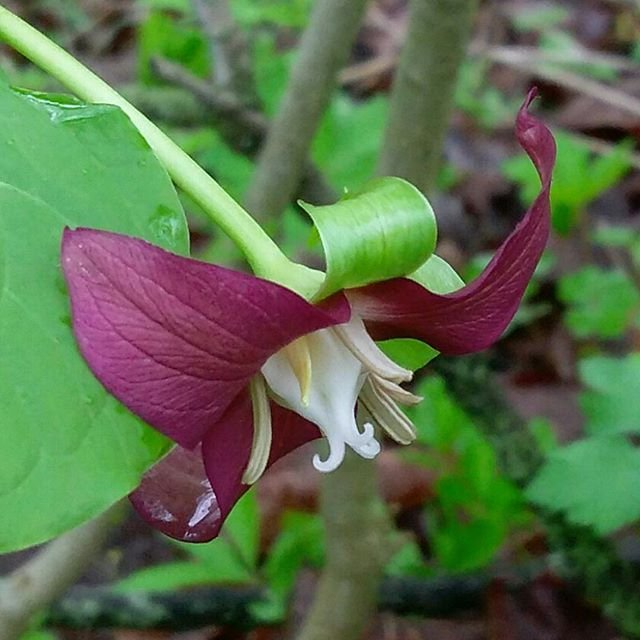
Variant with red petals

T. flexipes is known to hybridize with other Trillium species. In particular, hybrids between T. flexipes and T. erectum can occur. Indeed, the red-petaled forms of T. flexipes tend to occur in regions where the ranges of both species coincide. Hybridization is also suspected between T. flexipes and T. sulcatum.

== Bibliography ==
- Case, Frederick W.; Case, Roberta B. (1997). Trilliums. Portland, Oregon: Timber Press. ISBN 978-0-88192-374-2.
- Patrick, Thomas S. (1984). "Trillium sulcatum (Liliaceae), a New Species of the Southern Appalachians". Brittonia. 36 (1). New York Botanical Garden: 26–36. Bibcode:1984Britt..36...26P. doi:10.2307/2806287. JSTOR 2806287. S2CID 85116255.
