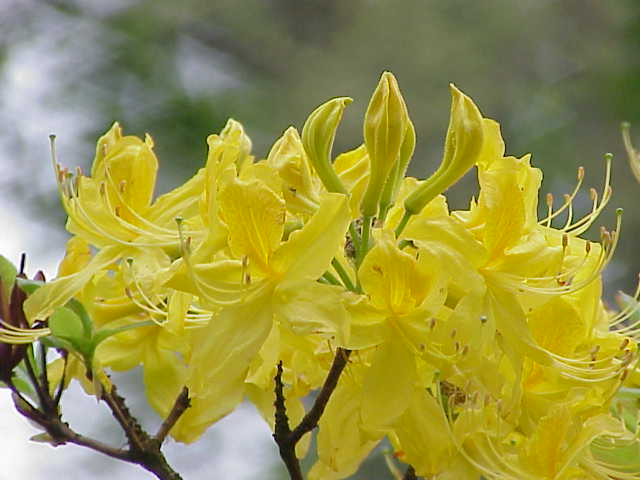
- Rhododendron luteum

Scientific classification
- Kingdom: Plantae
- Clade: Tracheophytes
- Clade: Angiosperms
- Clade: Eudicots
- Clade: Asterids
- Order: Ericales
- Family: Ericaceae
- Genus: Rhododendron
- Subgenus: Rhododendron subg. Pentanthera; G.Don Gen. Syst. III. 846 (1834)

Sections
- See text

= Rhododendron subg. Pentanthera =

Subgenus of flowering plants

Rhododendron subgenus Pentanthera was a subgenus of the genus Rhododendron. The common name azalea is applied to many of the species, and also to species in some other subgenera. In 2005 it was discontinued and its four sections moved or dismembered.

The subgenus included four sections:

- Rhododendron sect. Pentanthera
- Rhododendron sect. Rhodora
- Rhododendron sect. Sciadorhodion
- Rhododendron sect. Viscidula

== Bibliography ==
- Huxley, A., ed. (1992). New RHS Dictionary of Gardening. Macmillan.
