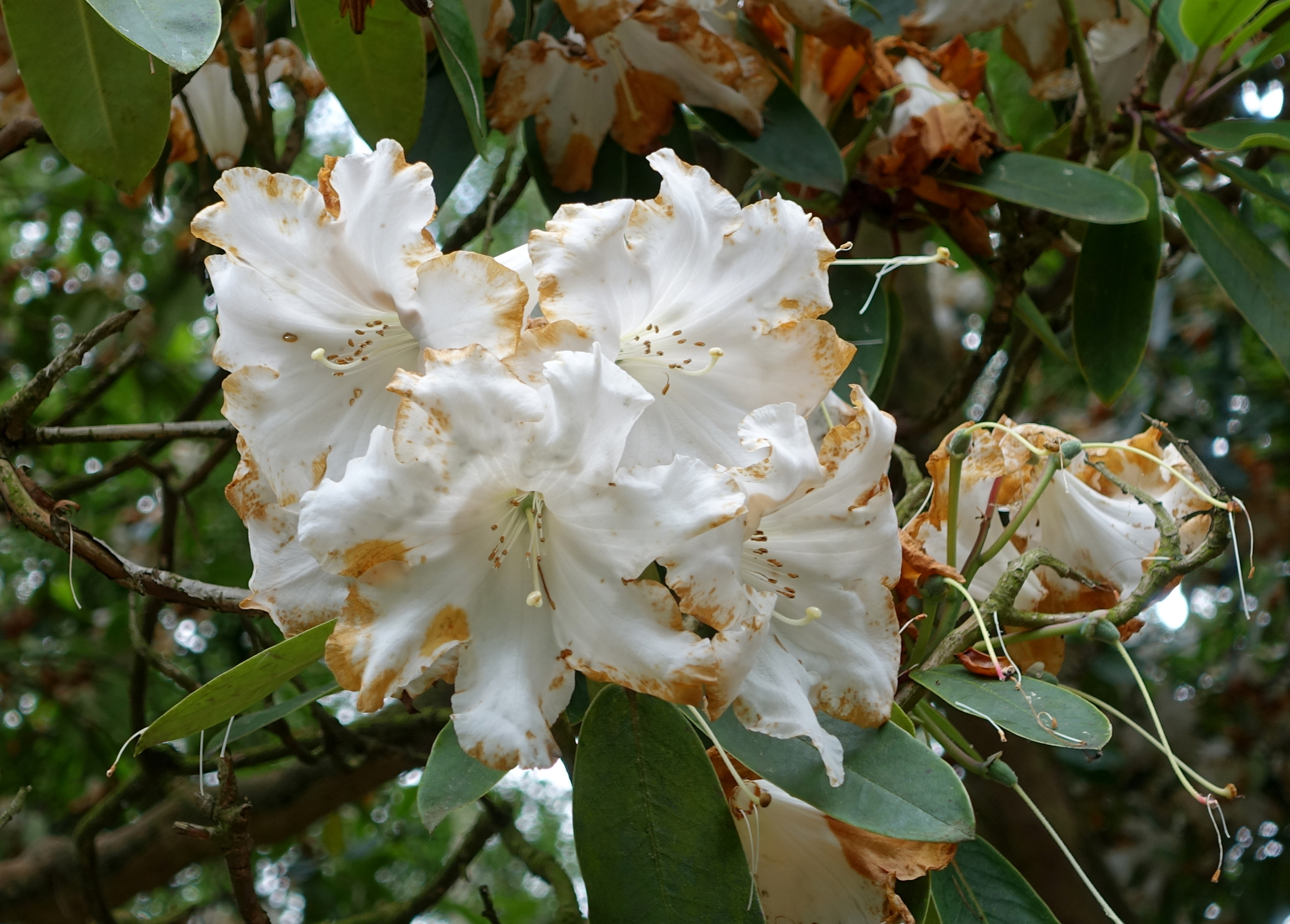
- Loderi King George

Scientific classification
- Kingdom: Plantae
- Clade: Tracheophytes
- Clade: Angiosperms
- Clade: Eudicots
- Clade: Asterids
- Order: Ericales
- Family: Ericaceae
- Genus: Rhododendron
- Species: R. × loderi

Binomial name
- Rhododendron × loderi Millais

= Rhododendron × loderi =

Species of plant

Rhododendron × loderi is a rhododendron hybrid engineered at Leonardslee, where they grow. It is named after Edmund Giles Loder, a British botanist, who developed a cross between R. fortunei and R. griffithianum.

It is an evergreen shrub that typically reaches heights of 1.8–4 metres (5.9–13.1 ft). The plant features leathery leaves that are oblong to oblong-elliptic. Rhododendron × loderi blooms from April to May, producing trusses trumpet-shaped flowers that emerge from bright pink buds. Flowers open a shade of pink, blush, or cream, and fade to pure white within a few days.

== Popular hybrids ==
Several well-known cultivated varieties of the Loderi group are frequently available from UK and global nurseries, the three below have received the Award of Garden Merit from the Royal Horticultural Society.:

- Loderi King George: Features enormous white flowers with a faint green throat and a legendary scent.
- Loderi Pink Diamond: Opens as a deep rose-pink before fading paler, retaining a strong fragrance.
- Loderi Pink Coral: Pale coral-pink blooms with a brownish-purple blotch.
