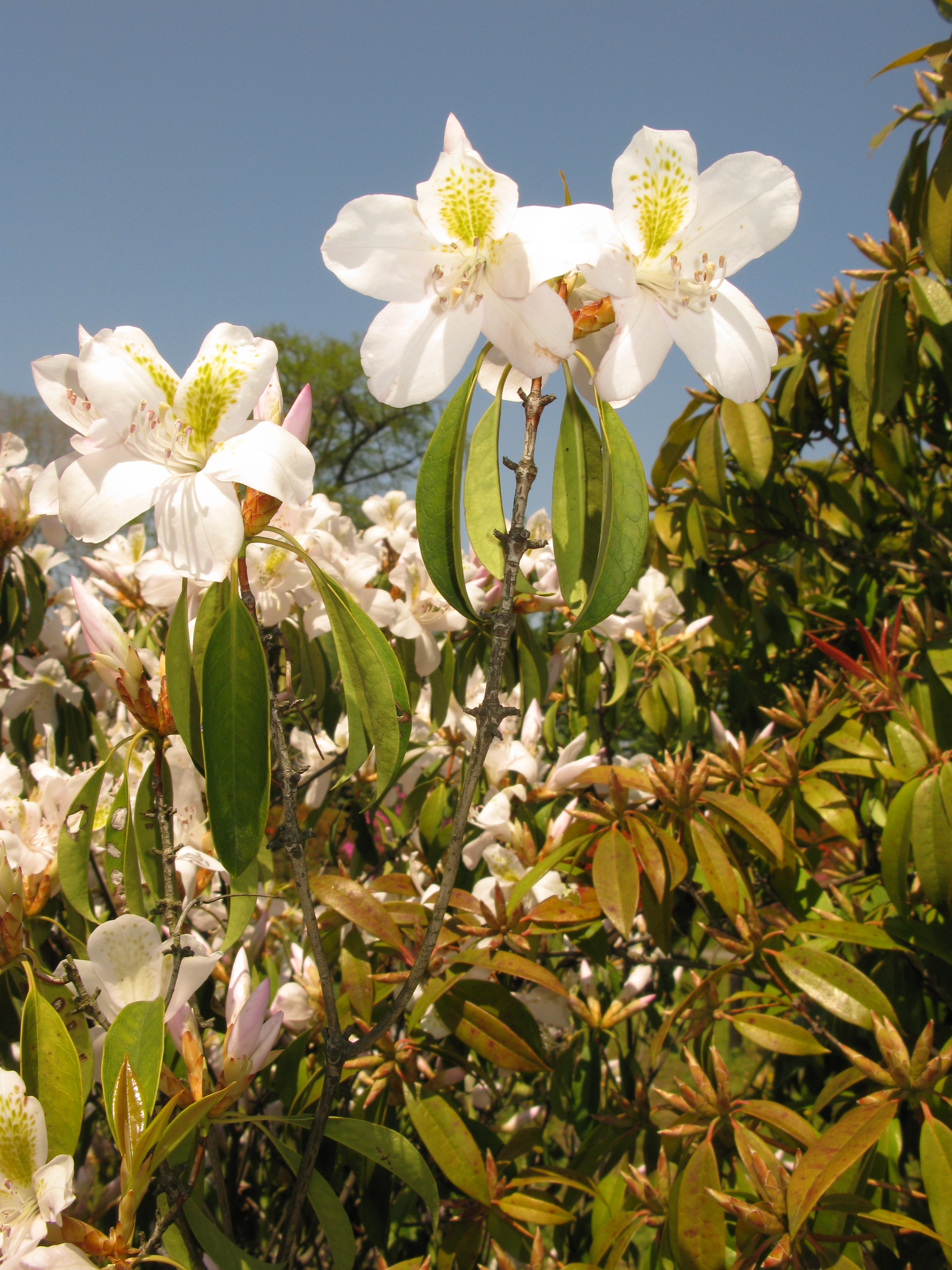
- Rhododendron latoucheae

Scientific classification
- Kingdom: Plantae
- Clade: Embryophytes
- Clade: Tracheophytes
- Clade: Spermatophytes
- Clade: Angiosperms
- Clade: Eudicots
- Clade: Asterids
- Order: Ericales
- Family: Ericaceae
- Genus: Rhododendron
- Subgenus: Rhododendron subg. Choniastrum; Franch.

Type species
- Rhododendron stamineum

Species
- See text

= Rhododendron subg. Choniastrum =

Subgenus of flowering plants

Rhododendron subg. Choniastrum is a subgenus of the genus Rhododendron, originally a section of subgenus Azaleastrum it was elevated to subgenus rank after cladistic analysis revealed that together with Rhododendron it formed a major clade, distinct from other sections of Azaleastrum.

== Species ==
The subgenus includes twenty species, including;

Image	Name	Distribution
	Rhododendron cavaleriei H.Lév. 1903	China (Hainan, Guizhou), Vietnam
	Rhododendron championiae Hook. 1851	China (Fujian, Guangdong, Guangxi, Hunan, Jiangxi, Zhejiang)
	Rhododendron dayaoshanense L.M.Gao & D.Z.Li 2003	China (Guangxi)
	Rhododendron feddei H.Lév. 1913	China (Guangxi)
	Rhododendron hancockii Hemsl. 1895	China (Sichuan, Yunnan, Guangxi, Xizang)
	Rhododendron henryi Hance 1881	China (Fujian, Guangdong, Guangxi, Jiangxi, Taiwan, Zhejiang), Taiwan
	Rhododendron huguangense P.C.Tam 1982	China (Guangxu, Guangdong, Hunan)
	Rhododendron latoucheae Franch. 1899	China, Nansei-shoto to Taiwan
	Rhododendron longilobum L.M.Gao & D.Z.Li 2003	China (Yunnan)
	Rhododendron mackenzianum Forrest 1920	China (Xizang, Yunnan), Myanmar
	Rhododendron mitriforme P.C.Tam 1982	China (Guangdong, Guangxi, Hunan)
	Rhododendron moulmainense Hook.	China (Fujian, Hainan, Hubei, Hunan, Guangdong, Guangxi, Yunnan) India, Indonesia, Malaysia, Myanmar, Thailand
	Rhododendron stamineum Franch. 1886	China (Anhui, Guangdong, Guangxi, Guizhou, Hubei, Hunan, Jiangxi, Shanxi, Sichuan, Yunnan, Zhejiang)
	Rhododendron subestipitatum Chun ex P.C.Tam 1982	China (Guangdong)
	Rhododendron taiense Hutch. 1938	Thailand
	Rhododendron taishunense B.Y.Ding & Y.Y.Fang 1987	China (Zhejiang)
	Rhododendron truncatovarium L.M.Gao & D.Z.Li 2004 publ. 2005	China (Yunnan, Guangxi)
	Rhododendron tutcherae Hemsl. & E.H.Wilson 1910	China (Yunnan)
	Rhododendron vaniotii H.Lév. 1914	China (Guizhou)
	Rhododendron westlandii Hemsl. 1889	China (Guizhou)

== Bibliography ==
- Craven, L.A.; Goetsch, L.A.; Hall, B.D.; Brown, G.K. (2008). "Classification of the Vireya group of Rhododendron (Ericaceae)". Blumea - Biodiversity, Evolution and Biogeography of Plants. 53 (2): 435. doi:10.3767/000651908X608070.
