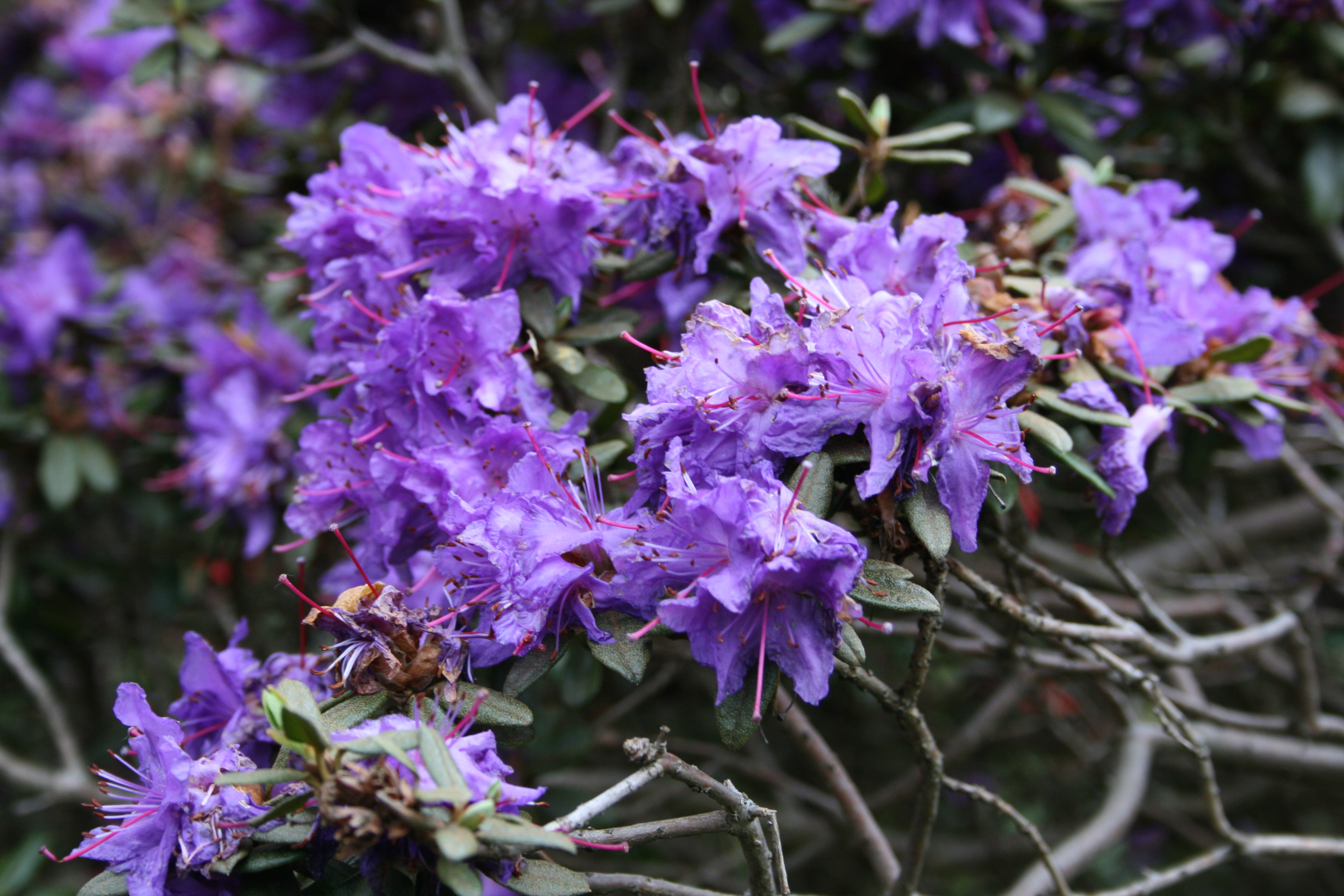

Scientific classification
- Kingdom: Plantae
- Clade: Embryophytes
- Clade: Tracheophytes
- Clade: Spermatophytes
- Clade: Angiosperms
- Clade: Eudicots
- Clade: Asterids
- Order: Ericales
- Family: Ericaceae
- Genus: Rhododendron
- Species: R. russatum

Binomial name
- Rhododendron russatum Balf.f. & Forrest

Synonyms
- List: Rhododendron cantabile Balf.f. ex Hutch.; Rhododendron osmerum Balf.f. & Forrest

= Rhododendron russatum =

Species of flowering plant

Rhododendron russatum, the purplish-blue rhododendron, is a species of flowering plant in the genus Rhododendron native to south-central China and Myanmar. It has gained the Royal Horticultural Society's Award of Garden Merit.
