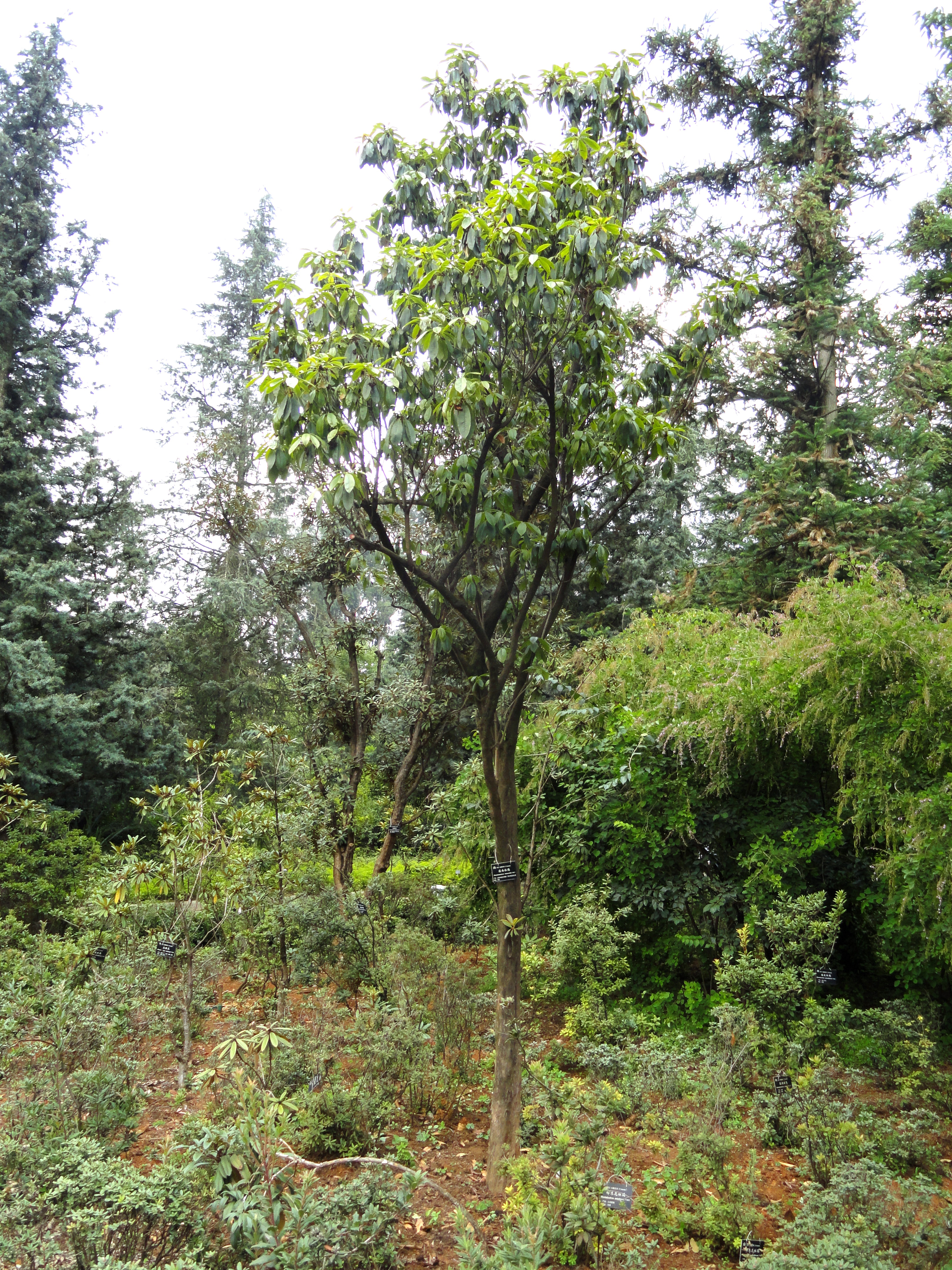

Scientific classification
- Kingdom: Plantae
- Clade: Tracheophytes
- Clade: Angiosperms
- Clade: Eudicots
- Clade: Asterids
- Order: Ericales
- Family: Ericaceae
- Genus: Rhododendron
- Species: R. hancockii

Binomial name
- Rhododendron hancockii Hemsl.

= Rhododendron hancockii =

Species of plant

Rhododendron hancockii (滇南杜鹃) is a species of flowering plant in the family Ericaceae. It is. native to Guangxi and Yunnan, China, where it grows at altitudes of 1,100–2,000 m (3,600–6,600 ft). It is a shrub or tree that grows to 2–7 m (6.6–23.0 ft) in height, with leathery leaves that are obovate or oblong-oblanceolate, 7–13 by 1.5–5 cm in size. The flowers are white with yellowish flecks.
