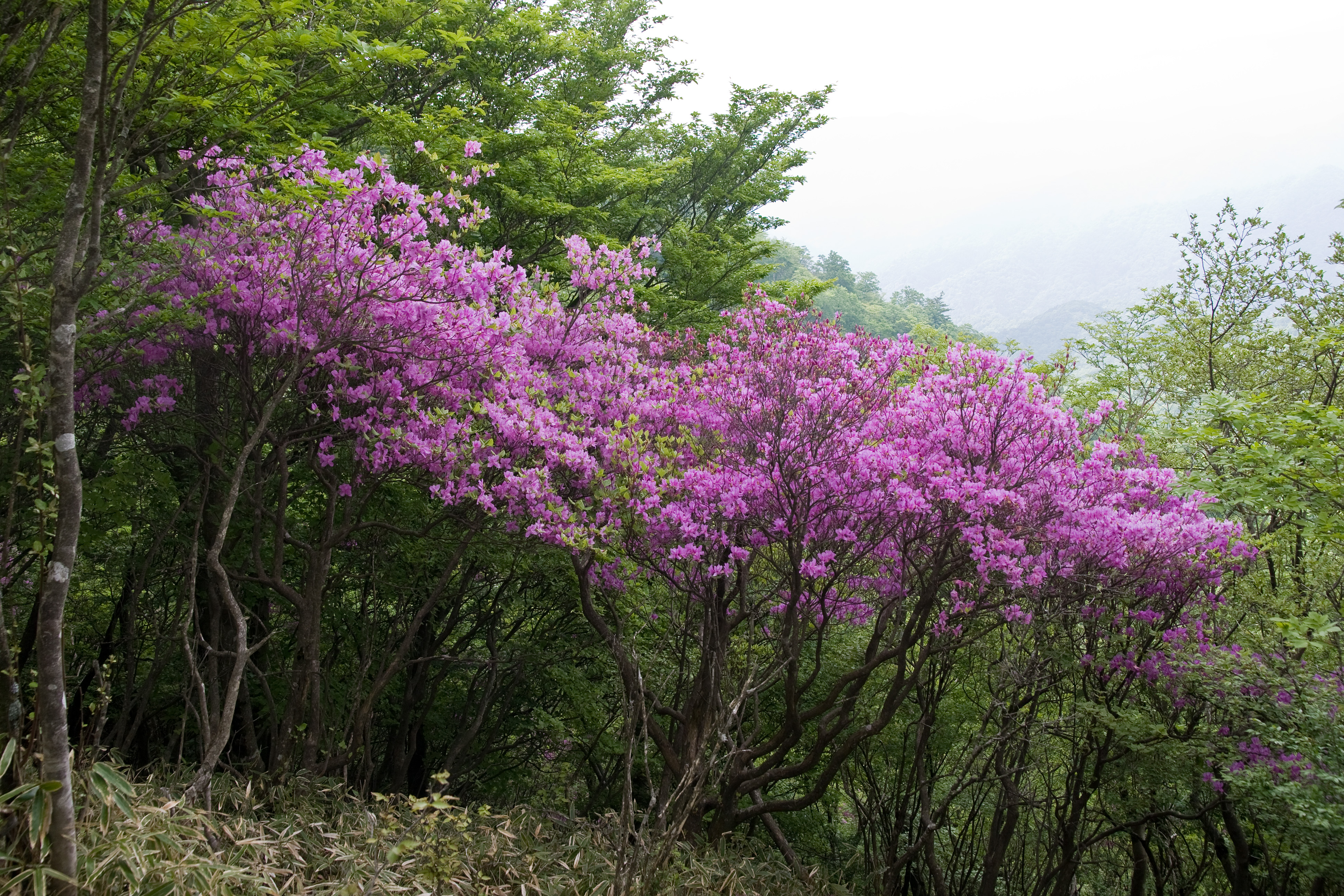
- Rhododendron wadanum

Scientific classification
- Kingdom: Plantae
- Clade: Tracheophytes
- Clade: Angiosperms
- Clade: Eudicots
- Clade: Asterids
- Order: Ericales
- Family: Ericaceae
- Genus: Rhododendron
- Subgenus: Rhododendron subg. Azaleastrum
- Section: Rhododendron sect. Sciadorhodion; Rehder & E.H.Wilson

Type species
- Rhododendron schlippenbachii

Species
- See text

Synonyms
- Menziesia Sm. 1791; Rhododendron sect. Azaleastrum Planch. ex Maxim., 1870; Azaleastrum (Planch. ex Maxim.) Rydb. 1900; Rhododendron sect. Candidastrum Sleumer 1949; Rhododendron subg. Candidastrum (Sleumer) M.N.Philipson & Philipson. 1982; Rhododendron ser. Dilatata T.Yamaz. 1993; Rhododendron ser. Glangulistyla T.Yamaz. 1993; Rhododendron sect. Quinquefolia T.Yamaz. 1993; Rhododendron sect. Schlippenbachia T.Yamaz., 1996

= Rhododendron sect. Sciadorhodion =

Section of rhododendrons

Rhododendron sect. Sciadorhodion is a subsection of subgenus Azaleastrum in the genus Rhododendron. It comprises 16 species of deciduous shrubs native to East Asia and North America.

== Taxonomy ==
Plants were previously classified in the genus Menziesia and reclassified within the genus Rhododendron and formally transferred in 2011.

== Species ==
Image	Name	Distribution
	Rhododendron albiflorum Hook. 1834	British Columbia to northern Oregon and inland to western Alberta to Montana, and Colorado
	Rhododendron albrechtii Maxim. 1870	Japan (Honshu and Hokkaido)
	Rhododendron benhallii Craven 2011	Japan (Honshu, Shikoku)
	Rhododendron dilatatum Miq. 1836	Japan (Honshu).
	Rhododendron goyozanense (M.Kikuchi) Craven 2011	Japan (N. Honshu)
	Rhododendron katsumatae (M.Tash. & H.Hatta) Craven 2011	Japan (Honshu)
	Rhododendron kroniae Craven 2011	Japan (Kyushu)
	Rhododendron menziesii Craven 2011	Alaska through the Pacific Northwest to northwestern California and Wyoming
	Rhododendron multiflorum (Maxim.) Craven 2011	Japan (S. Hokkaido, N. & Central Honshu)
	Rhododendron osuzuyamense T.Yamaz. 2019	Japan (C. Kyushu).
	Rhododendron pentandrum (Maxim.) Craven 2011	Sakhalin to Japan
	Rhododendron pilosum (Maxim.) Craven 2011	United States (S. Pennsylvania to Georgia)
	Rhododendron quinquefolium Bisset & S.Moore 1877	Japan (C. Honshu, Shikoku)
	Rhododendron schlippenbachii Maxim. 1870	S. Russian, Korea, China (Inner Mongolia, Manchuria) and Japan
	Rhododendron vaseyi A.Gray 1880	North Carolina
	Rhododendron wadanum Makino 1917	Japan (C. Honshu)
	Rhododendron yakushimense (M.Tash. & H.Hatta) Craven 2011	Japan (Yakushima)
