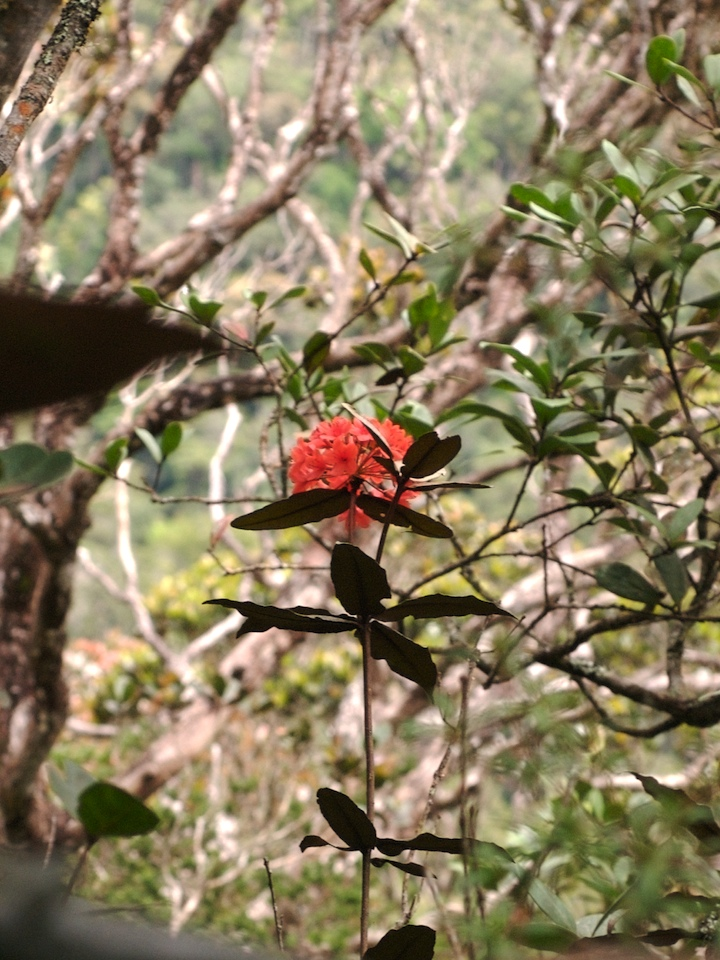

Conservation status
- Least Concern (IUCN 3.1)

Scientific classification
- Kingdom: Plantae
- Clade: Embryophytes
- Clade: Tracheophytes
- Clade: Spermatophytes
- Clade: Angiosperms
- Clade: Eudicots
- Clade: Asterids
- Order: Ericales
- Family: Ericaceae
- Genus: Rhododendron
- Species: R. fallacinum

Binomial name
- Rhododendron fallacinum Sleumer

= Rhododendron fallacinum =

Species of flowering plant

Rhododendron fallacinum is a species of rhododendron native to Borneo.

It a hemiepiphytic shrub or small tree which grows up to 6 metres (20 ft) tall.

It is native to the mountains of Sabah and Sarawak states of Malaysia in northern Borneo, including Mount Kinabalu, Mount Trus Madi, and the Crocker Range in Sabah and Mount Mulu in Sarawak. The species' estimated extent of occurrence (EOO) is 17,011 km^{2} (6,568 sq mi), and its area of occupancy (AOO) is 120 km^{2} (46 sq mi).

It lives in montane forests from 1,200 to 2,600 metres (3,900 to 8,500 ft) elevation. It grows mostly as a terrestrial shrub, and less commonly as an epiphyte, in damp shady areas of mossy montane rain forest. It also grows among other shrubs on open ridges and rocky slopes, where it can be the dominant species.
