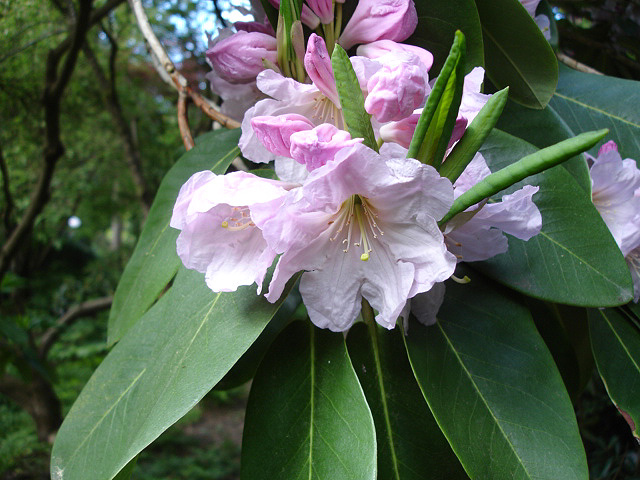

Scientific classification
- Kingdom: Plantae
- Clade: Tracheophytes
- Clade: Angiosperms
- Clade: Eudicots
- Clade: Asterids
- Order: Ericales
- Family: Ericaceae
- Genus: Rhododendron
- Species: R. fortunei

Binomial name
- Rhododendron fortunei Lindl.

= Rhododendron fortunei =

Species of plant

Rhododendron fortunei (Chinese: 云锦杜鹃; pinyin: yúnjǐn dùjuān) is a rhododendron species native to China, where it grows at altitudes of 600–2,000 meters (2,000–6,600 ft). It is named after Robert Fortune, a Scottish botanist, who brought many plant species to the West from China.

It is an evergreen shrub that typically reaches heights of 3–12 metres (9.8–39.4 ft). The plant features leathery leaves that are oblong to oblong-elliptic, measuring 8–14.5 cm (3 1/8–5 3/4 in) in length and 3–9.2 cm (1 3/16–3 5/8 in) in width. Rhododendron fortunei blooms from April to May, producing trusses of 6–12 flowers that are campanulate, white to pink, and fragrant.
