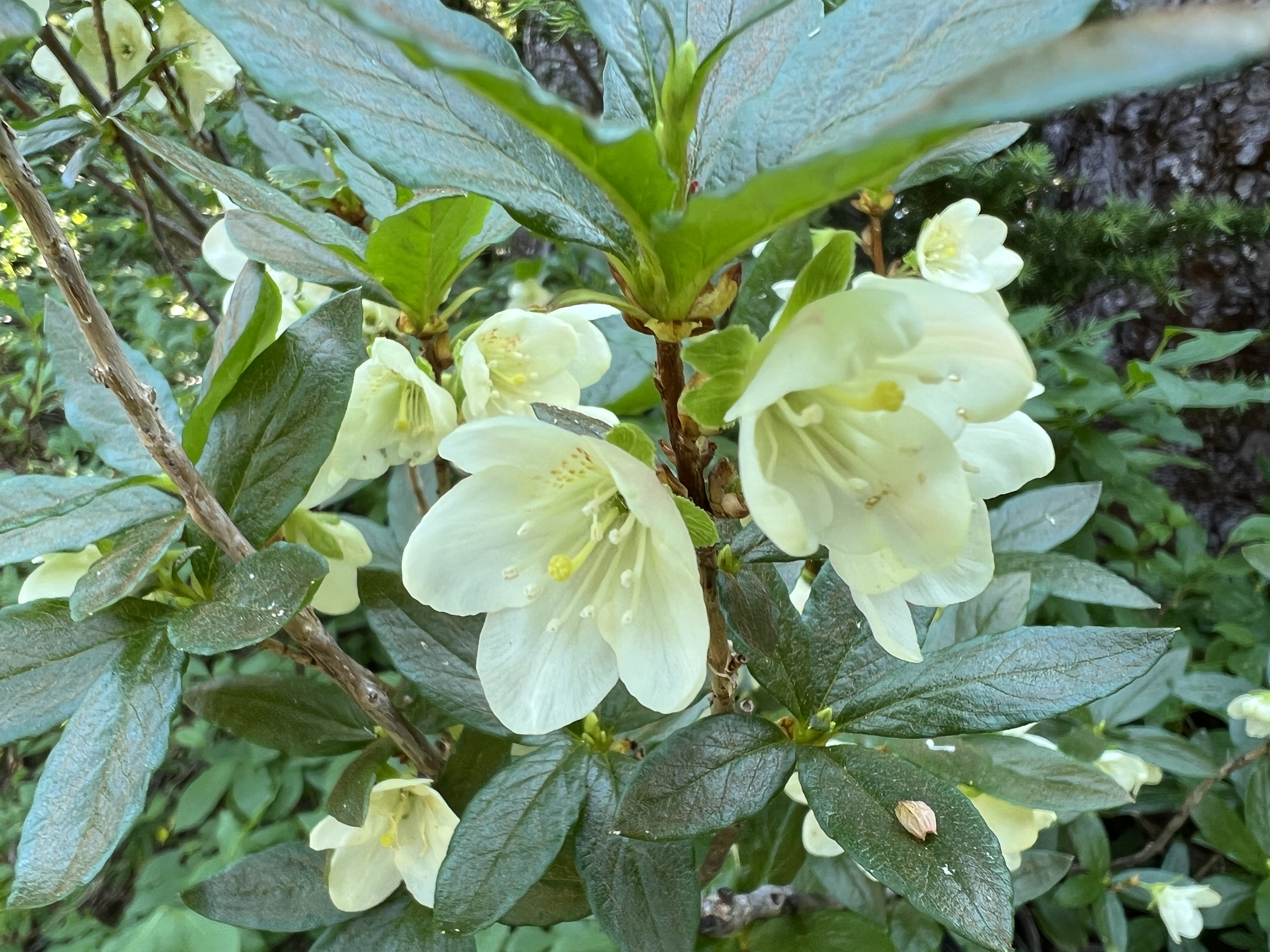

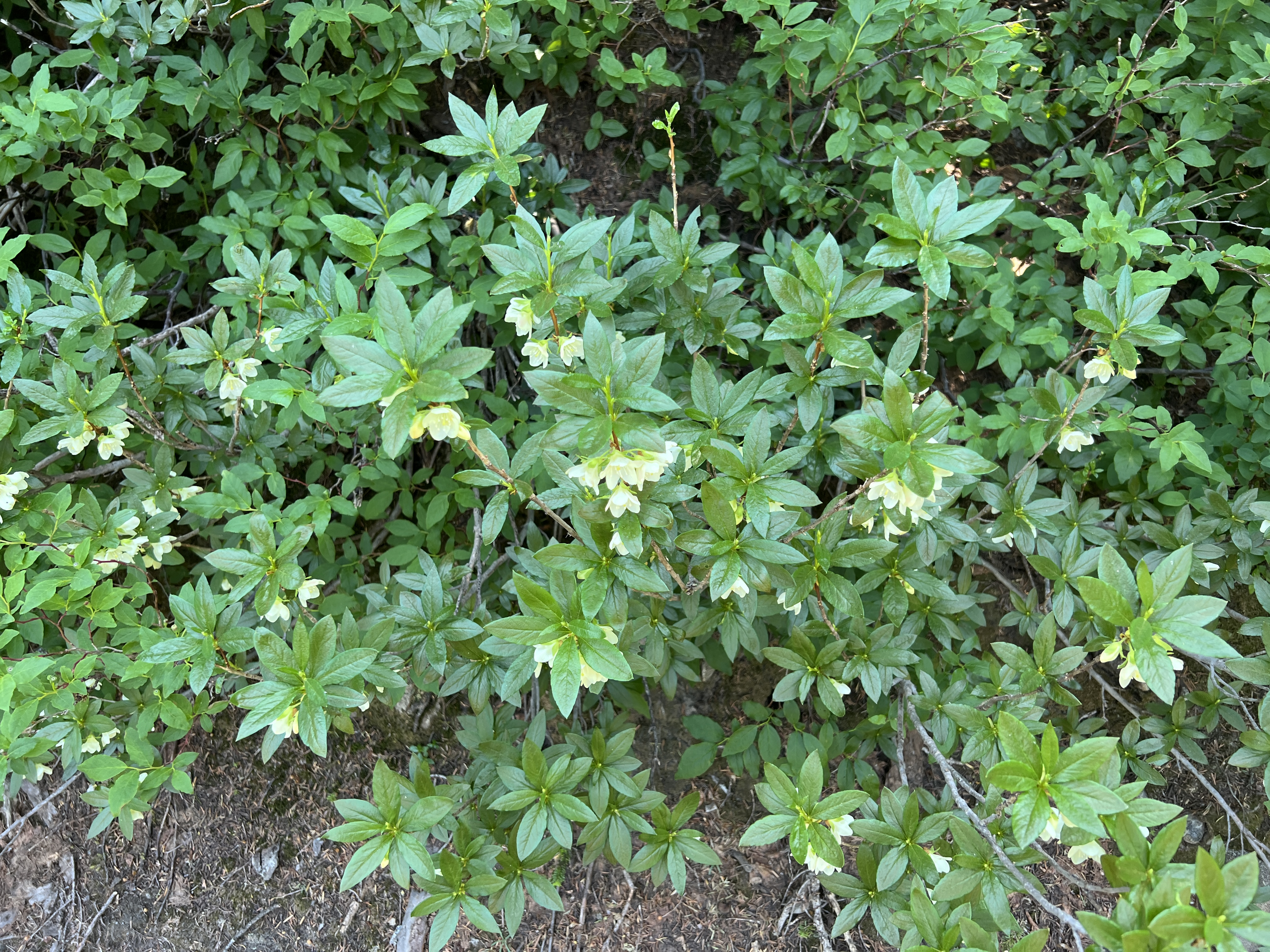
- Growth form

Conservation status
- Secure (NatureServe)

Scientific classification
- Kingdom: Plantae
- Clade: Tracheophytes
- Clade: Angiosperms
- Clade: Eudicots
- Clade: Asterids
- Order: Ericales
- Family: Ericaceae
- Genus: Rhododendron
- Species: R. albiflorum

Binomial name
- Rhododendron albiflorum Hook.

= Rhododendron albiflorum =

Species of plant

Rhododendron albiflorum is a deciduous shrub in the family Ericaceae, with the common names white-flowered rhododendron or white rhododendron.

== Description ==
Rhododendron albiflorum is a deciduous shrub up to 2.5 m tall, with thin shiny medium-green elliptical entire leaves that are 4 to 9 cm long and held on short petioles. The leaves are often slightly crinkled or wavy especially at their edges, and are sparsely covered with reddish to white hairs. Leaves may be clustered in a rosette-like form near twig tips or may be spread alternately along twigs.

The early to mid summer flowers are white and born in outward facing to slightly pendulous clusters of 1–5 at axils on the previous years growth. Each flower is up to 2 cm in width and has five petals that are fused at the base to form a bowl shaped base, often with yellowish speckles.

== Range and habitat ==
Rhododendron albiflorum grows in mountains from British Columbia to northern Oregon and inland to western Alberta and eastern Montana, at elevations above 1,000 meters. There is a disjunct population in the northern Colorado Rocky Mountains.

Rhododendron albiflorum is usually found on densely to partially forested moist mountain slopes, often forming a substantial part of the shrubby understory.
