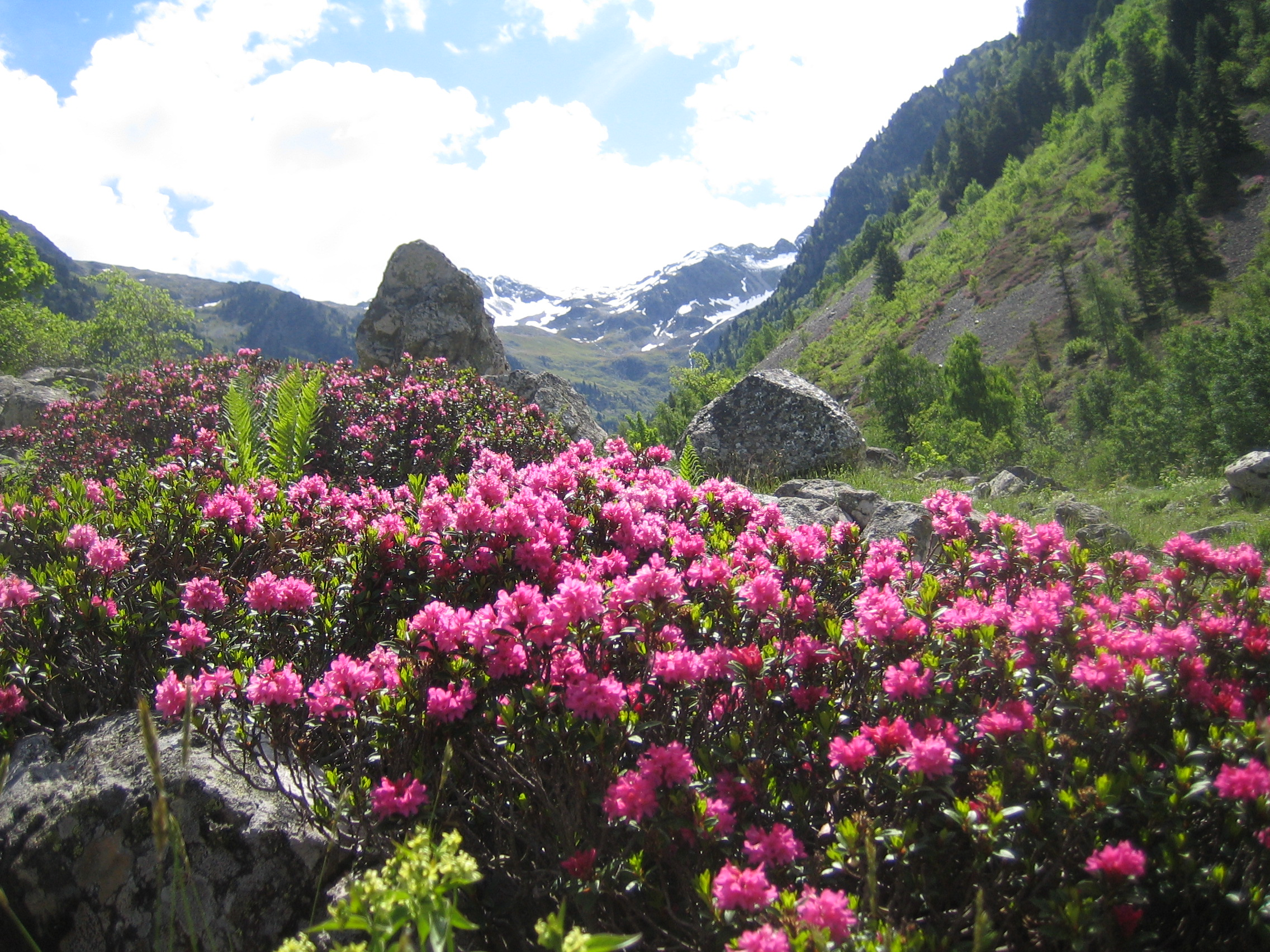
- Rhododendron ferrugineum

Scientific classification
- Kingdom: Plantae
- Clade: Tracheophytes
- Clade: Angiosperms
- Clade: Eudicots
- Clade: Asterids
- Order: Ericales
- Family: Ericaceae
- Subfamily: Ericoideae
- Tribe: Rhodoreae; DC. ex Duby
- Genus: Rhododendron; L.

Type species
- Rhododendron ferrugineum L.

Subgenera
- Azaleastrum; Choniastrum; Hymenanthes; Rhododendron; Therorhodion; Former subgenera: Candidastrum; Mumeazalea; Pentanthera; Tsutsusi

Synonyms
- List: Anthodendron Rchb.; Azaleastrum Rydb.; × Azaleodendron Rodigas; Biltia Small; Candollea Baumg.; Chamaecistus Regel; Chamaerhododendron Bubani; Chamaerhododendros Duhamel; Diplarche Hook.f. & Thomson; Dulia Adans.; Haustrum Noronha; Hochenwartia Crantz; Hymenanthes Blume; Iposues Raf.; × Ledodendron F.de Vos; Ledum Ruppius ex L.; Loiseleria Rchb.; Menziesia Sm.; Osmothamnus DC.; Plinthocroma Dulac; × Rhodazalea Anon.; Rhodora L.; Rhodothamnus Lindl. & Paxton; Stemotis Raf.; Theis Salisb. ex DC.; Therorhodion Small; Tsusiophyllum Maxim.; Vireya Blume; Waldemaria Klotzsch

= Rhododendron =

Rhododendron Temporal range: 52–0 Ma Ypresian - present

Genus of flowering plants

Rhododendron (/ˌroʊdəˈdɛndrən/; pl.: rhododendra), from Ancient Greek ῥόδον (rhódon), meaning "rose", and δένδρον (déndron), meaning "tree", is a very large genus of about 1,024 species of woody plants in the heath family (Ericaceae). They can be either evergreen or deciduous. Most species are native to eastern Asia and the Himalayan region, but smaller numbers occur elsewhere in Asia, and in Europe, North America, and Australia.

Azaleas make up two subgenera of Rhododendron. They are distinguished from "true" rhododendrons by having only five anthers per flower.

Various species of Rhododendron are the national flower of Nepal, the state flower of Washington and West Virginia in the United States, the state flower of Nagaland and Himachal Pradesh in India, the provincial flower of Jeju Province in South Korea and Jiangxi in China, and the state tree of Sikkim and Uttarakhand in India. Most species have brightly coloured flowers which bloom from late winter through to early summer.

== Description ==
Rhododendron is a genus of shrubs and small to (rarely) large trees, the smallest species, R. cespitosum of New Guinea, growing to 10–100 cm (4–40 in) tall, and the largest, R. protistum var. giganteum, reported to 30 m (100 ft) tall. The leaves are spirally arranged; leaf size can range from 1–2 cm (3/8–3/4 in) to over 50 cm (20 in), exceptionally 100 cm (40 in) in R. sinogrande. They may be either evergreen or deciduous. In some species, the undersides of the leaves are covered with scales (lepidote) or hairs (indumentum).

Most species have brightly coloured flowers which bloom from late winter through to early summer. Some of the best-known species are noted for having many clusters of large flowers. A recently discovered species in New Guinea has flowers up to six inches (15 centimeters) in width, the largest in the whole genus. The accompanying photograph shows it as having seven petals. There are alpine species with small flowers and small leaves, and tropical species such as section Vireya that often grow as epiphytes. Species in this genus may be part of the heath complex in oak–heath forests in eastern North America.

They have frequently been divided based on the presence or absence of scales on the abaxial (lower) leaf surface (lepidote or elepidote). These scales, unique to subgenus Rhododendron, are modified hairs consisting of a polygonal scale attached by a stalk.

Rhododendron are characterised by having inflorescences with scarious (dry) perulae, a chromosome number of x=13, fruit that has a septicidal capsule, an ovary that is superior (or nearly so), stamens that have no appendages, and agglutinate (clumped) pollen.

== Taxonomy ==
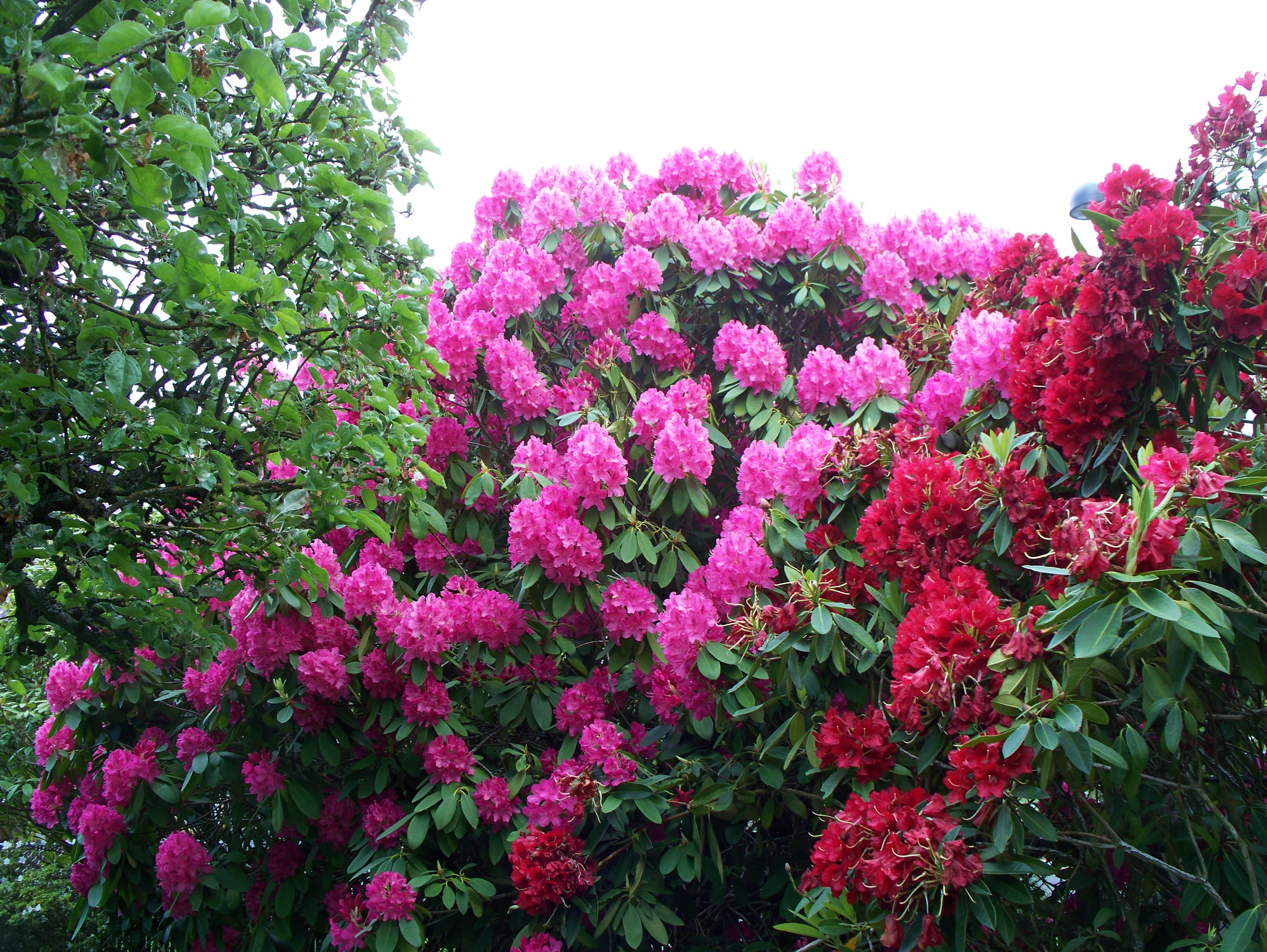
A garden with tall Rhododendrons in Lynnwood, Washington

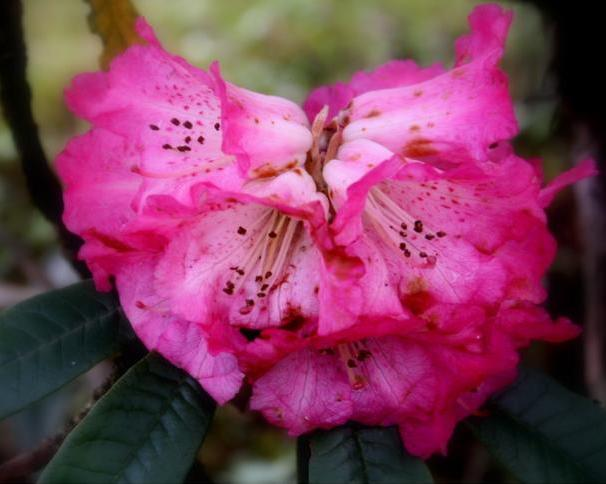
Rhododendron (গুরাস), Sandakphu, West Bengal, India

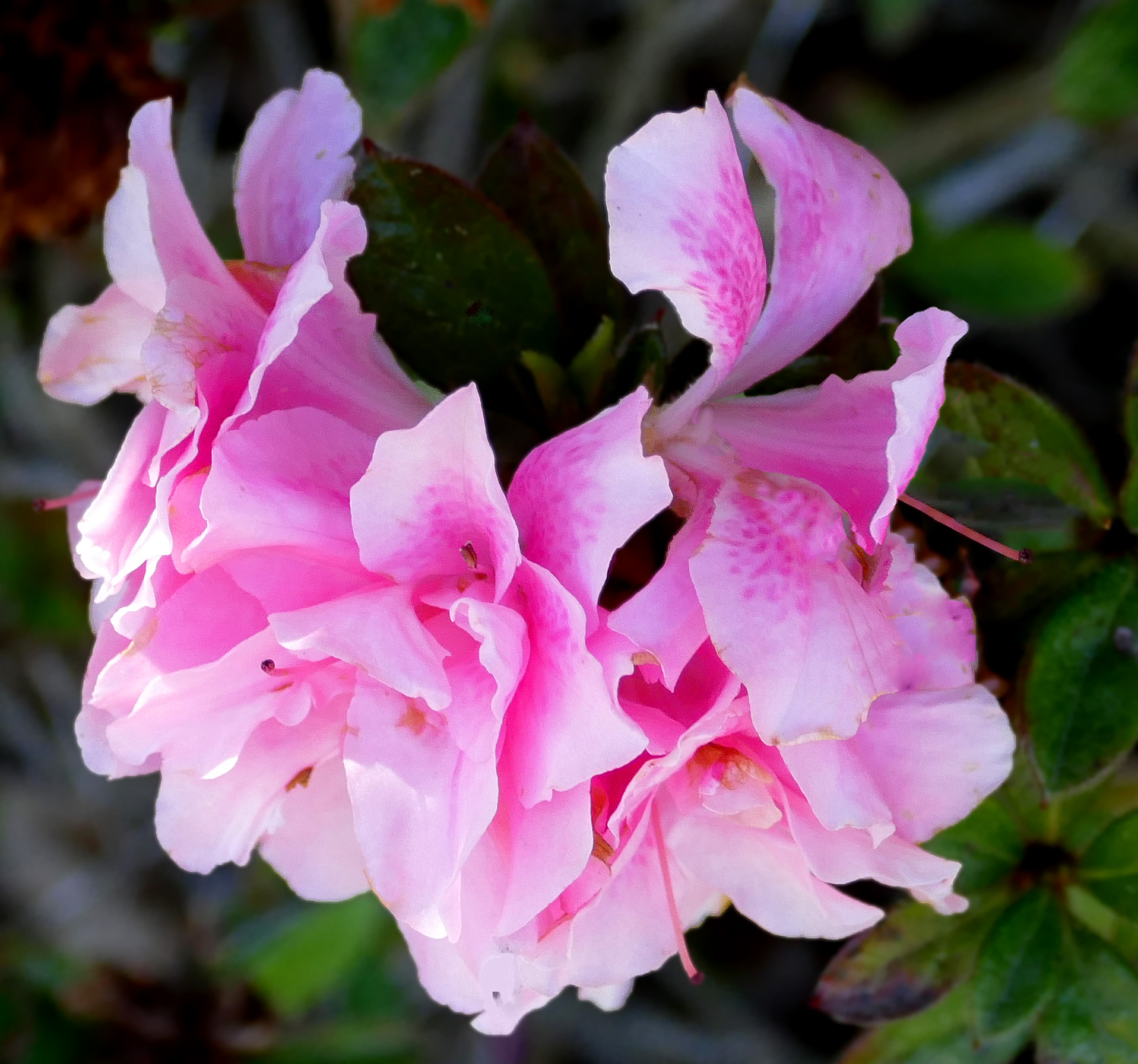
Azalea, Texas Gulf Coast

Rhododendron is the largest genus in the family Ericaceae, with over 1,000 species, (though estimates vary from 850 to 1,200) and is morphologically diverse. Consequently, the taxonomy has been historically complex. It is currently the only genus accepted in the tribe Rhodoreae, though historically several subgroups have been given generic rank, including Azalea, Ledum, and Menziesia.

=== Early history ===
Although Rhododendrons had been known since the description of Rhododendron hirsutum by Charles de l'Écluse (Clusius) in the sixteenth century, and were known to classical writers (Magor 1990), and referred to as Chamaerhododendron (low-growing rose tree), the genus was first formally described by Linnaeus in his Species Plantarum in 1753. He listed five species under Rhododendron: R. ferrugineum (the type species), R. dauricum, R. hirsutum, R. chamaecistus (now Rhodothamnus chamaecistus (L.) Rchb.) and R. maximum. At that time he considered the then known six species of Azalea that he had described earlier in 1735 in his Systema Naturae as a separate genus.

Linnaeus' six species of Azalea were Azalea indica, A. pontica, A. lutea, A. viscosa, A. lapponica and A. procumbens (now Kalmia procumbens), which he distinguished from Rhododendron by having five stamens, as opposed to ten. As new species of what are now considered Rhododendron were discovered, they were assigned to separate genera if they seemed to differ significantly from the type species. For instance Rhodora (Linnaeus 1763) for Rhododendron canadense, Vireya (Blume 1826) and Hymenanthes (Blume 1826) for Rhododendron metternichii, now R. degronianum. Meanwhile, other botanists such as Salisbury (1796) and Tate (1831) began to question the distinction between Azalea and Rhododendron, and finally in 1836, Azalea was incorporated into Rhododendron and the genus divided into eight sections. Of these Tsutsutsi (Tsutsusi), Pentanthera, Pogonanthum, Ponticum and Rhodora are still used, the other sections being Lepipherum, Booram, and Chamaecistus. This structure largely survived till recently (2004), following which the development of molecular phylogeny led to major re-examinations of traditional morphological classifications, although other authors such as Candolle, who described six sections, used slightly different numeration.

Soon, as more species became available in the nineteenth century so did a better understanding of the characteristics necessary for the major divisions. Chief amongst these were Maximovicz's Rhododendreae Asiae Orientali and Planchon. Maximovicz used flower bud position and its relationship with leaf buds to create eight "Sections". Bentham and Hooker used a similar scheme, but called the divisions "Series". It was not until 1893 that Koehne appreciated the significance of scaling and hence the separation of lepidote and elepidote species. The large number of species that were available by the early twentieth century prompted a new approach when Balfour introduced the concept of grouping species into series. The Species of Rhododendron referred to this series concept as the Balfourian system. That system continued up to modern times in Davidian's four volume The Rhododendron Species.

=== Modern classification ===
The next major attempt at classification was by Sleumer who from 1934 began incorporating the Balfourian series into the older hierarchical structure of subgenera and sections, according to the International Code of Botanical Nomenclature, culminating in 1949 with his "Ein System der Gattung Rhododendron" and subsequent refinements. Most of the Balfourian series are represented by Sleumer as subsections, though some appear as sections or even subgenera. Sleumer based his system on the relationship of the flower buds to the leaf buds, habitat, flower structure, and whether the leaves were lepidote or non-lepidote. While Sleumer's work was widely accepted, many in the United States and the United Kingdom continued to use the simpler Balfourian system of the Edinburgh group.

Sleumer's system underwent many revisions by others, predominantly the Edinburgh group in their continuing Royal Botanic Garden Edinburgh notes. Cullen of the Edinburgh group, placing more emphasis on the lepidote characteristics of the leaves, united all of the lepidote species into subgenus Rhododendron, including four of Sleumer's subgenera (Rhododendron, Pseudoazalea, Pseudorhodorastrum, Rhodorastrum). In 1986 Philipson & Philipson raised two sections of subgenus Aleastrum (Mumeazalea, Candidastrum) to subgenera, while reducing genus Therorhodion to a subgenus of Rhododendron. In 1987 Spethmann, adding phytochemical features proposed a system with fifteen subgenera grouped into three 'chorus' subgenera.

A number of closely related genera had been included together with Rhododendron in a former tribe, Rhodoreae. These have been progressively incorporated into Rhododendron. Chamberlain and Rae moved the monotypic section Tsusiopsis together with the monotypic genus Tsusiophyllum into section Tsutsusi, while Kron & Judd reduced genus Ledum to a subsection of section Rhododendron. Then Judd & Kron moved two species (R. schlippenbachii and R. quinquefolium) from section Brachybachii, subgenus Tsutsusi and two from section Rhodora, subgenus Pentanthera (R. albrechtii, R. pentaphyllum) into section Sciadorhodion, subgenus Pentanthera. Finally Chamberlain brought the various systems together in 1996, with 1,025 species divided into eight subgenera. Goetsch (2005) provides a comparison of the Sleumer and Chamberlain schemata (Table 1).

=== Phylogeny ===
Cladogram of genus Rhododendron
(Goetsch et al. 2005)

- - - - A
        - Rhododendron
        - Choniastrum
      - B
        Hymenanthes
    - C
      Azaleastrum
  - - Therorhodion

The era of molecular analysis rather than descriptive features can be dated to the work of Kurashige (1988) and Kron (1997) who used matK sequencing. Later Gao et al. (2002) used ITS sequences to determine a cladistic analysis. They confirmed that the genus Rhododendron was monophyletic, with subgenus Therorhodion in the basal position, consistent with the matK studies. Following publication of the studies of Goetsch et al. (2005) with RPB2, there began an ongoing realignment of species and groups within the genus, based on evolutionary relationships. Their work was more supportive of Sleumer's original system than the later modifications introduced by Chamberlain et al..

The major finding of Goetsch and colleagues was that all species examined (except R. camtschaticum, subgenus Therorhodion) formed three major clades which they labelled A, B, and C, with the subgenera Rhododendron and Hymenanthes as monophyletic groups nested within clades A and B, respectively. By contrast subgenera Azaleastrum and Pentanthera were polyphyletic, while R. camtschaticum appeared as a sister to all other rhododendrons. The small polyphyletic subgenera Pentanthera and Azaleastrum were divided between two clades. The four sections of Pentanthera between clades B and C, with two each, while Azaleastrum had one section in each of A and C.

Thus subgenera Azaleastrum and Pentanthera needed to be disassembled, and Rhododendron, Hymenanthes and Tsutsusi correspondingly expanded. In addition to the two separate genera included under Rhododendron by Chamberlain (Ledum, Tsusiophyllum), Goetsch et al.. added Menziesia (clade C). Despite a degree of paraphyly, the subgenus Rhododendron was otherwise untouched with regard to its three sections but four other subgenera were eliminated and one new subgenus created, leaving a total of five subgenera in all, from eight in Chamberlain's scheme. The discontinued subgenera are Pentanthera, Tsutsusi, Candidastrum and Mumeazalea, while a new subgenus was created by elevating subgenus Azaleastrum section Choniastrum to subgenus rank.

Subgenus Pentanthera (deciduous azaleas) with its four sections was dismembered by eliminating two sections and redistributing the other two between the existing subgenera in clades B (Hymenanthes) and C (Azaleastrum), although the name was retained in section Pentanthera (14 species) which was moved to subgenus Hymenanthes. Of the remaining three sections, monotypic Viscidula was discontinued by moving R. nipponicum to Tsutsusi (C), while Rhodora (2 species) was itself polyphyletic and was broken up by moving R. canadense to section Pentanthera (B) and R. vaseyi to section Sciadorhodion, which then became a new section of subgenus Azaleastrum (C).

Subgenus Tsutsusi (C) was reduced to section status retaining the name, and included in subgenus Azaleastrum. Of the three minor subgenera, all in C, two were discontinued. The single species of monotypic subgenus Candidastrum (R. albiflorum) was moved to subgenus Azaleastrum, section Sciadorhodion. Similarly the single species in monotypic subgenus Mumeazalea (R. semibarbatum) was placed in the new section Tsutsusi, subgenus Azaleastrum. Genus Menziesa (9 species) was also added to section Sciadorhodion. The remaining small subgenus Therorhodion with its two species was left intact. Thus two subgenera, Hymenanthes and Azaleastrum were expanded at the expense of four subgenera that were eliminated, although Azaleastrum lost one section (Choniastrum) as a new subgenus, since it was a distinct subclade in A. In all, Hymenanthes increased from one to two sections, while Azaleastrum, by losing one section and gaining two increased from two to three sections. (See schemata under Subgenera.)

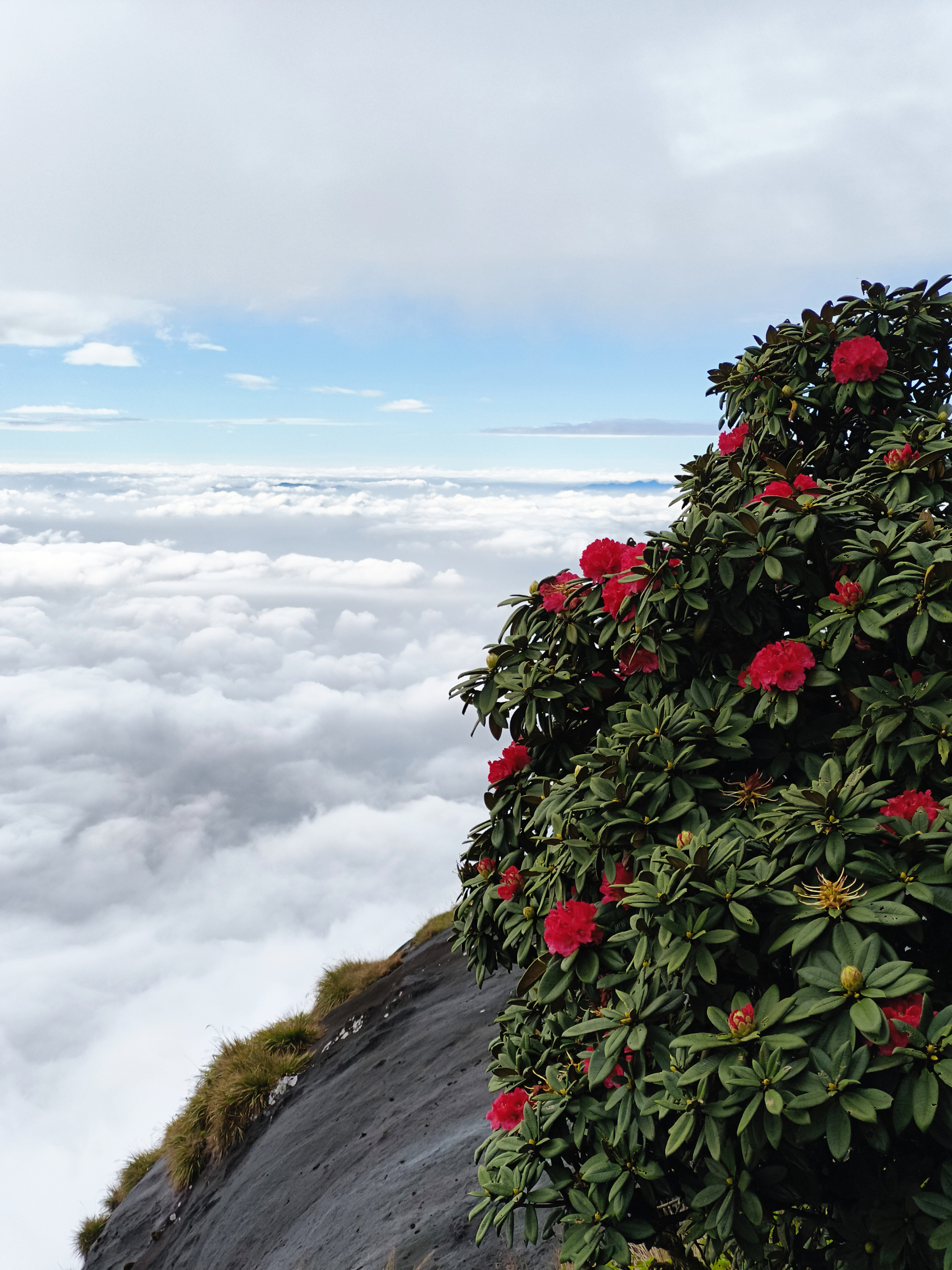
Rhododendron arboreum in Western Ghats

Taxonomic changes within genus Rhododendron
Chamberlain (1996)				Goetsch (2005)	
Genus	Subgenus	Section	Species	Subgenus	Section
Menziesa			9 species	Azaleastrum; C	Sciadorhodion
Rhododendron	Candidastrum		R. albiflorum	Azaleastrum; C	Sciadorhodion
Rhododendron	Pentanthera	Sciadorhodion	4 species	Azaleastrum; C	Sciadorhodion
Rhododendron	Pentanthera	Rhodora	R. vaseyi	Azaleastrum; C	Sciadorhodion
Rhododendron	Pentanthera	Rhodora	R. canadense	Hymenanthes; B	Pentanthera
Rhododendron	Pentanthera	Pentanthera	14 species	Hymenanthes; B	Pentanthera
Rhododendron	Pentanthera	Viscidula	R. nipponicum	Azaleastrum; C	Tsutsusi
Rhododendron	Tsutsusi	Brachycalyx	15 species	Azaleastrum; C	Tsutsusi
Rhododendron	Tsutsusi	Tsutsusi	65 species	Azaleastrum; C	Tsutsusi
Rhododendron	Mumeazalea		R. semibarbatum	Azaleastrum; C	Tsutsusi
Rhododendron	Azaleastrum	Choniastrum	11 species	Choniastrum; A	

Subsequent research has supported the revision by Goetsch, although has largely concentrated on further defining the phylogeny within the subdivisions. In 2011 the two species of Diplarche were also added to Rhododendron, incertae sedis.

=== Subdivision ===
This genus has been progressively subdivided into a hierarchy of subgenus, section, subsection, and species.

==== Subgenera ====
Terminology from the Sleumer (1949) system is frequently found in older literature, with five subgenera and is as follows;

- Subgenus Lepidorrhodium Koehne: Lepidotes. 3 sections
- Subgenus Eurhododendron Maxim.: Elipidotes.
- Subgenus Pseudanthodendron Sleumer: Deciduous azaleas. 3 sections
- Subgenus Anthodendron Rehder & Wilson: Evergreen azaleas. 3 sections
- Subgenus Azaleastrum Planch.: 4 sections

In the later traditional classification, attributed to Chamberlain (1996), and as used by horticulturalists and the American Rhododendron Society, Rhododendron has eight subgenera based on morphology, namely the presence of scales (lepidote), deciduousness of leaves, and the floral and vegetative branching patterns, after Sleumer (1980). These consist of four large and four small subgenera. The first two subgenera (Rhododendron and Hymenanthes) represent the species commonly considered as 'Rhododendrons'. The next two smaller subgenera (Pentanthera and Tsutsusi) represent the 'Azaleas'. The remaining four subgenera contain very few species. The largest of these is subgenus Rhododendron, containing nearly half of all known species and all of the lepidote species.

- Subgenus Rhododendron L.: Small leaf or lepidotes (scales on the underside of the leaves). 3 sections, 462 species, type species: R. ferrugineum.
- Subgenus Hymenanthes (Blume) K.Koch: Large leaf or elepidotes (without scales). 1 section, 224 species, type R. degronianum.
- Subgenus Pentanthera (G. Don) Pojarkova: Deciduous azaleas. 4 sections, 23 species, type R. luteum.
- Subgenus Tsutsusi (Sweet) Pojarkova: Evergreen azaleas. 2 sections, 80 species, type R. indicum.
- Subgenus Azaleastrum Planch.: 2 sections, 16 species, type R. ovatum.
- Subgenus Candidastrum Franch.: 1 species, R. albiflorum.
- Subgenus Mumeazalea (Sleumer) W.R. Philipson & M.N. Philipson: 1 species, Rhododendron semibarbatum.
- Subgenus Therorhodion (Maxim.) A. Gray: 2 species (Rhododendron camtschaticum, Rhododendron redowskianum).

For a comparison of the Sleumer and Chamberlain systems, see Goetsch et al. (2005) Table 1.

This division was based on a number of what were thought to be key morphological characteristics. These included the position of the inflorescence buds (terminal or lateral), whether lepidote or elepidote, deciduousness of leaves, and whether new foliage was derived from axils from previous year's shoots or the lowest scaly leaves.

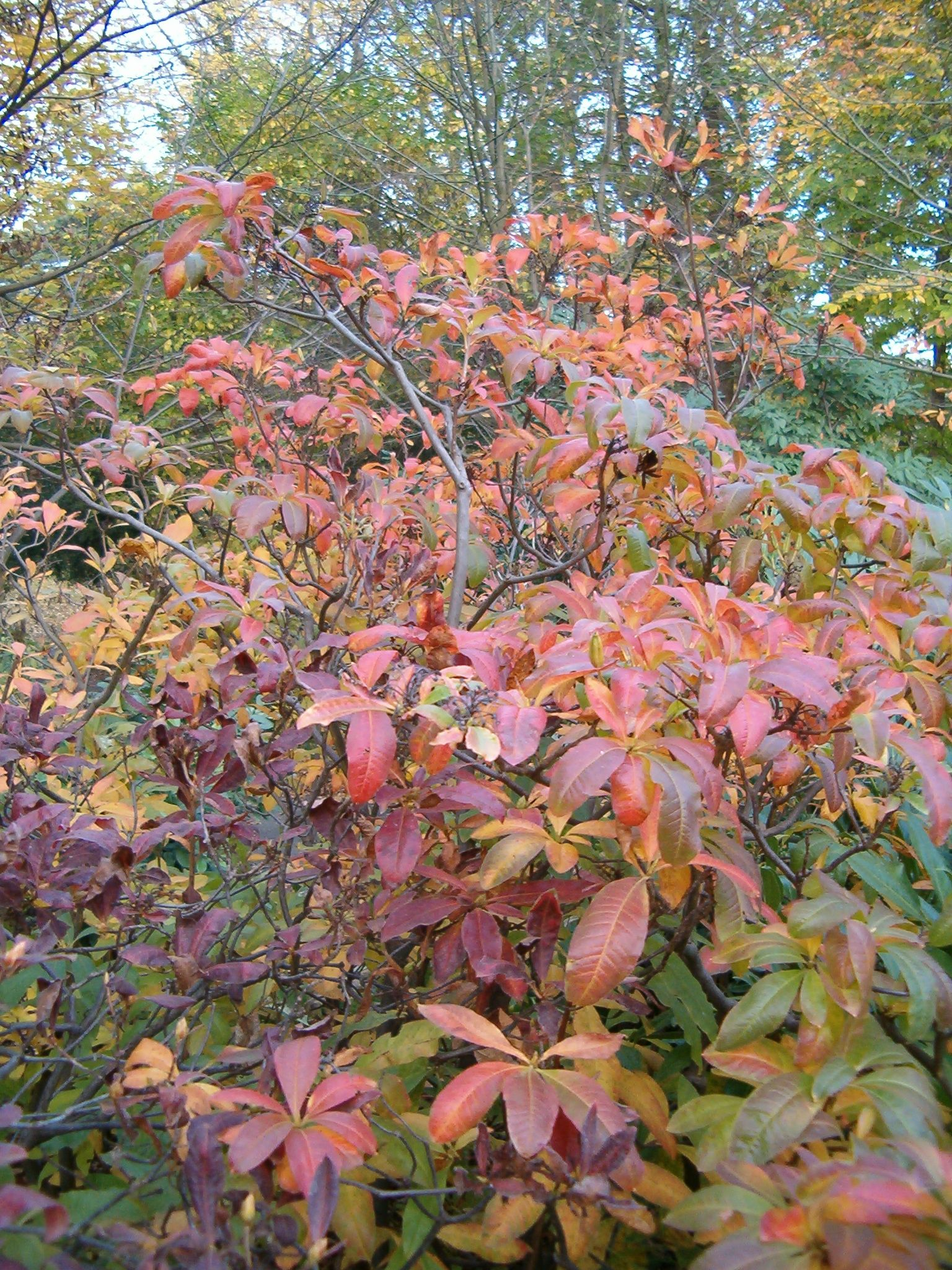
Deciduous Rhododendron luteum in fall colour

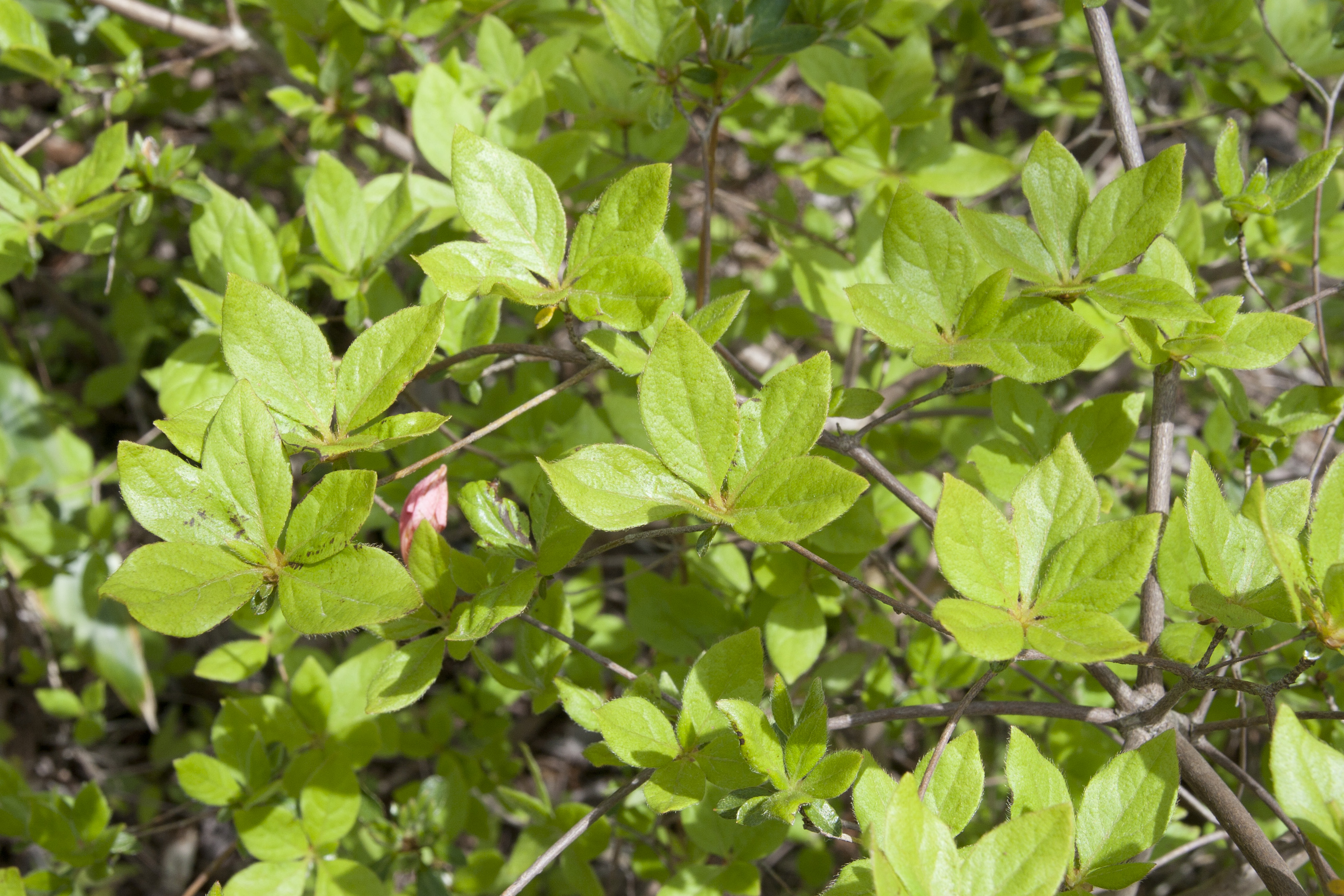
Evergreen azalea Rhododendron kaempferi

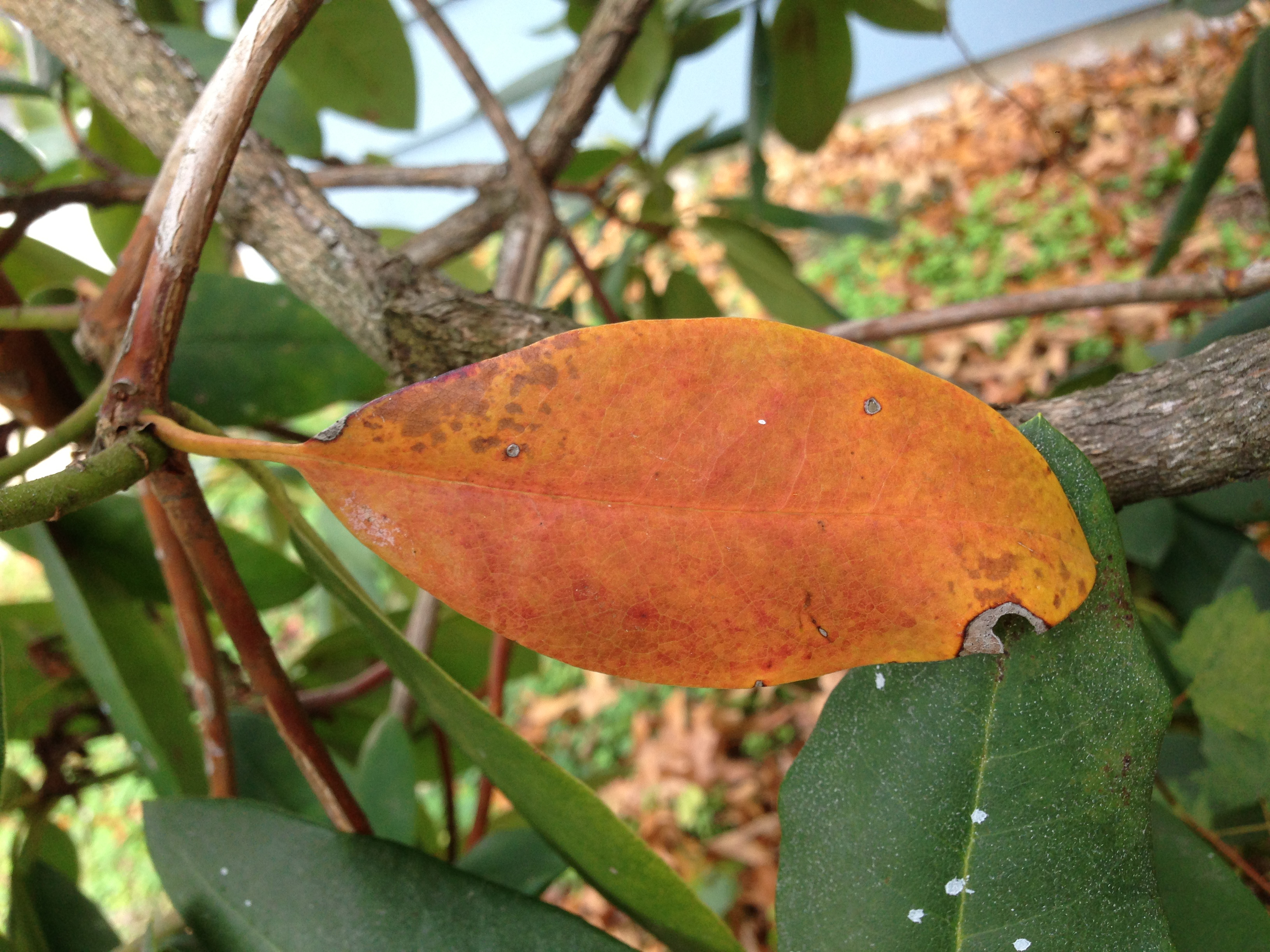
Evergreen azalea cultivar leaf colour before shedding

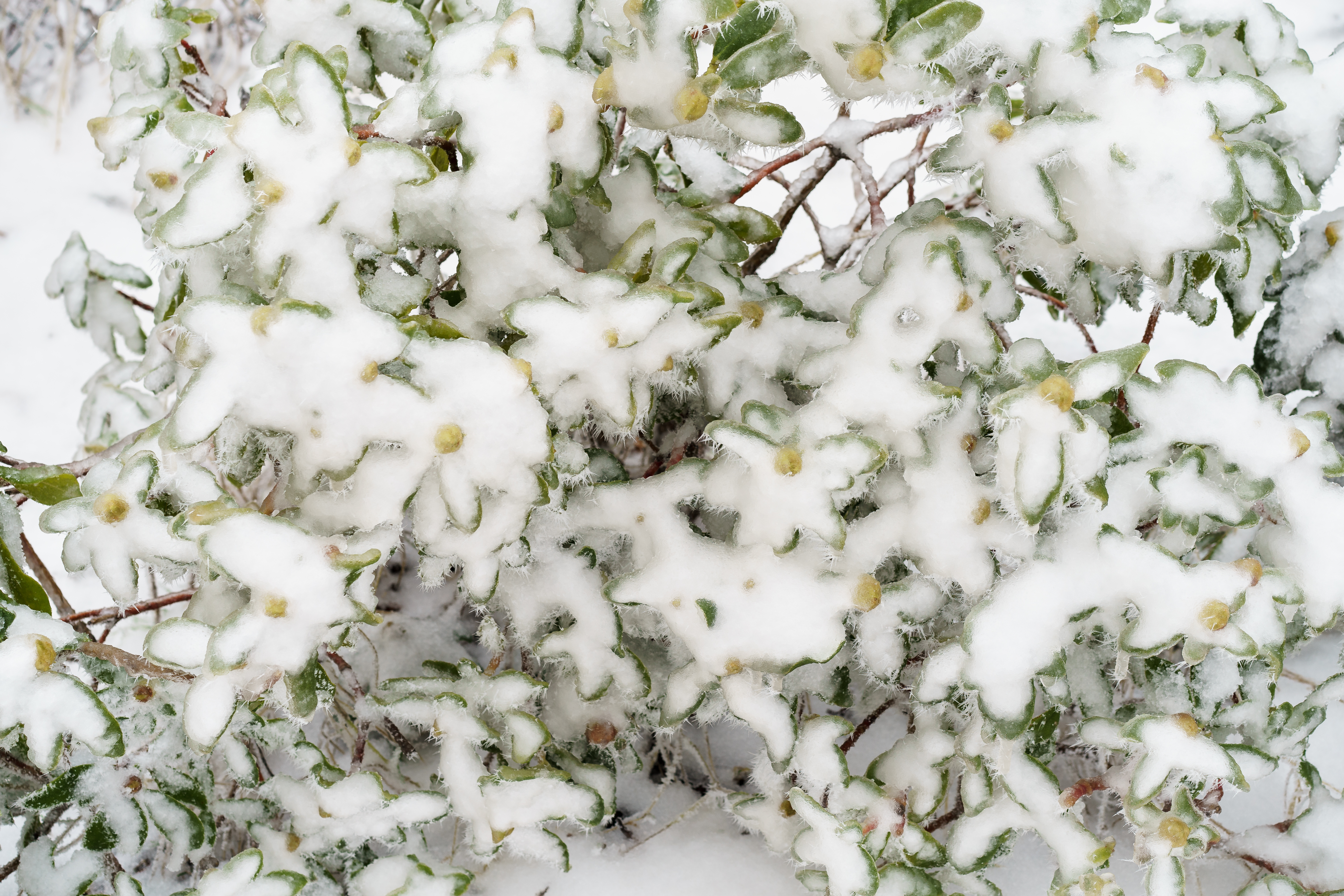
Rhododendron after freezing rain

Morphological classification of Rhododendron (Chamberlain 1996)
Inflorescence buds	Leaf scales	Leaf shoots	Leaves	Subgenus	Section
Terminal	Present			Rhododendron	
Terminal	Absent	Previous year	Evergreen	Hymenanthes	
Terminal	Absent	Previous year	Deciduous	Pentanthera	Pentanthera
Terminal	Absent	Previous year	Deciduous	Pentanthera	Rhodora
Terminal	Absent	Previous year	Deciduous	Pentanthera	Viscidula
Terminal	Absent	Lowest leaves		Pentanthera	Sciadorhodion
Terminal	Absent	Lowest leaves		Tsutsusi	
Lateral			Evergreen	Azaleastrum	
Lateral			Deciduous	Candidastrum	
Lateral			Deciduous	Mumeazalea	
Lateral			Deciduous	Therorhodion	

Following the cladistic analysis of Goetsch et al. (2005) this scheme was simplified, based on the discovery of three major clades (A, B, C) as follows.

Clade A

- Subgenus Rhododendron L.: Small leaf or lepidotes (scales on the underside of the leaves). 3 sections, about 400 species, type species: R. ferrugineum.
- Subgenus Choniastrum Franch.: 11 species

Clade B

- Subgenus Hymenanthes (Blume) K.Koch: Large leaf or elepidotes (without scales), including deciduous azaleas. 2 sections, about 140–225 species, type R. degronianum.

Clade C

- Subgenus Azaleastrum Planch.: Evergreen azaleas. 3 sections, about 120 species, type Rhododendron ovatum.

Sister taxon

- Subgenus Therorhodion (Maxim.) A. Gray: 2 species (R. camtschaticum and R. redowskianum).

==== Sections and subsections ====
The larger subgenera are further subdivided into sections and subsections Some subgenera contain only a single section, and some sections only a single subsection. Shown here is the traditional classification, with species number after Chamberlain (1996), but this scheme is undergoing constant revision. Revisions by Goetsch et al. (2005) and by Craven et al. (2008) shown in (parenthetical italics). Older ranks such as Series (groups of species) are no longer used but may be found in the literature, but the American Rhododendron Society still uses a similar device, called Alliances

- Subgenus Rhododendron L. (3 sections, 462 species: increased to five sections in 2008)
  - (Discovereya (Sleumer) Argent, raised from Vireya)
  - Pogonathum Aitch. & Hemsl. (13 species; Himalaya and adjacent mountains)
  - (Pseudovireya (C.B.Clarke) Argent, raised from Vireya)
  - Rhododendron L. (149 species in 25 subsections; temperate to subarctic Northern Hemisphere)
  - Vireya (Blume) Copel.f. (300 species in 2 subsections; tropical southeast Asia, Australasia. At one time considered separate subgenus)
- Subgenus Hymenanthes (Blume) K.Koch (1 section, 224 species) (Increased to two sections)
  - Ponticum G. Don (24 subsections)
  - (Pentanthera (G. Don) Pojarkova (2 subsections – new section, moved from subgenus Pentanthera)
- Subgenus Pentanthera (G. Don) Pojarkova (4 sections, 23 species) (Discontinued)
  - Pentanthera (G. Don) Pojarkova (2 subsections – moved to subgenus Hymenanthes)
  - Rhodora (L.) G. Don (2 species; Rhododendron canadense, Rhododendron vaseyi) (Discontinued, redistributed)
  - Sciadorhodion Rehder & Wilson (4 species) (Moved to subgenus Azaleastrum)
  - Viscidula Matsum. & Nakai (1 species; Rhododendron nipponicum) (Discontinued, added to section Tsutsusi, subgenus Azaleastrum)
- Subgenus Tsutsusi (Sweet) Pojarkova (2 sections, 80 species) (Discontinued, reduced to section and moved to subgenus Azaleastrum)
  - Brachycalyx Sweet (3 alliances, 15 species)
  - Tsutsusi (Sweet) Pojarkova (65 species)
- Subgenus Azaleastrum Planch. (2 sections, 16 species) (Increased to three sections)
  - Azaleastrum Planch. (5 species)
  - (Choniastrum Franch. (11 species) (Raised to subgenus))
  - (Sciadorhodion Rehder & Wilson (4 species) (Moved from subgenus Pentanthera))
  - (Tsutsusi (Sweet) Pojarkova (reduced from subgenus))
- Subgenus Candidastrum Franch. (1 species: Rhododendron albiflorum) (Discontinued, moved to section Sciadorhodion, subgenus Azaleastrum)
- Subgenus Mumeazalea (Sleumer) W.R. Philipson & M.N. Philipson (1 species: Rhododendron semibarbatum) (Discontinued, moved to section Tsutsusi, subgenus Azaleastrum)
- Subgenus Therorhodion A. Gray (2 species)
- (Subgenus Choniastrum Franch. (11 species))

The system used by the World Flora Online as of December 2023 uses six subgenera, four of which are divided further:

- subgenus Azaleastrum Planch. ex K.Koch
  - section Azaleastrum Planch. ex Maxim.
  - section Sciadorhodion Rehder & E.H.Wilson
  - section Tsutsutsi (Sweet) Pojark.
- subgenus Choniastrum Franch.
- subgenus Hymenanthes (Blume) K.Koch
  - section Pentanthera G.Don
  - section Ponticum G.Don
  - section Rhodora (L.) G.Don
- subgenus Rhododendron L.
  - section Pogonanthum G.Don
  - section Rhododendron
- subgenus Therorhodion (Maxim) Rehder
- subgenus Vireya Clarke
  - section Albovireya (Sleumer) Argent
  - section Discovireya (Sleumer) Argent
  - section Hadranthe Schltr.
  - section Malayovireya (Sleumer) Argent
  - section Pseudovireya (Clarke) Sleumer
  - section Schistanthe Schltr.
  - section Siphonovireya Argent

== Distribution and habitat ==
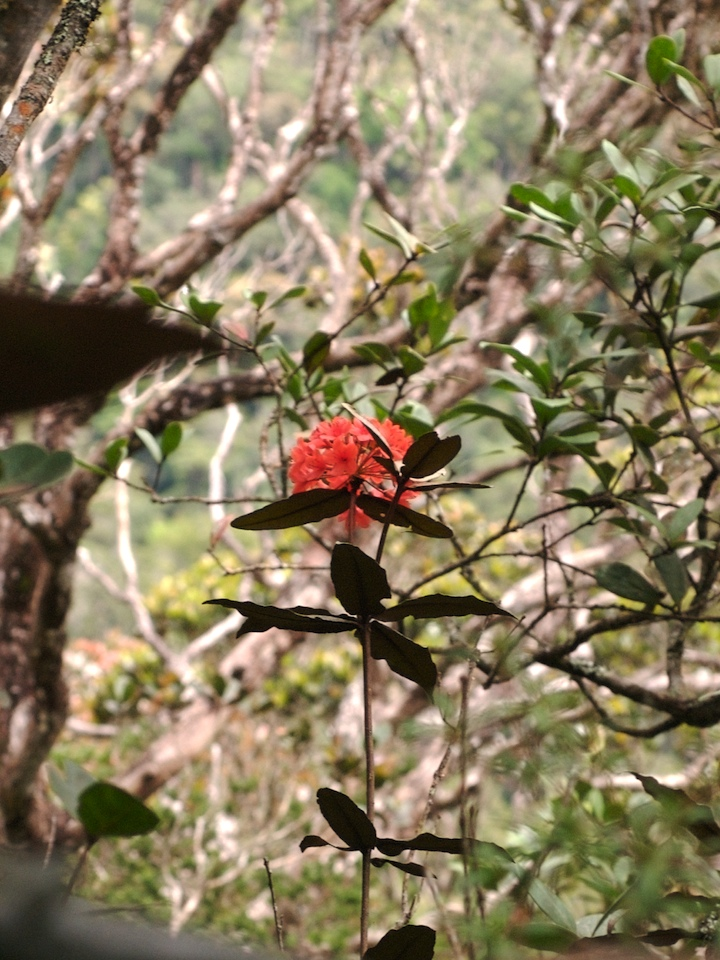
R. fallacinum photographed in situ on Mount Kinabalu, Borneo

Rhododendron species are widely distributed between latitudes 80°N and 20°S and are native to areas from North America to Europe, Russia, and Asia, and from Greenland to Queensland, Australia and the Solomon Islands. The centres of diversity are in the Himalayas and Maritime Southeast Asia, with the greatest species diversity in the Sino-Himalayan region, Southwest China and northern Burma, from India – Himachal Pradesh, Uttarakhand, Sikkim and Nagaland to Nepal, northwestern Yunnan and western Sichuan and southeastern Tibet. Other significant areas of diversity are in the mountains of Korea, Japan and Taiwan. More than 90% of Rhododendron sensu Chamberlain belong to the Asian subgenera Rhododendron, Hymenanthes and section Tsutsusi. Of the first two of these, the species are predominantly found in the area of the Himalayas and Southwest China (Sino-Himalayan Region).

The 300 tropical species within the Vireya section of subgenus Rhododendron occupy the Maritime Southeast Asia from their presumed Southeast Asian origin to Northern Australia, with 55 known species in Borneo and 164 in New Guinea. The species in New Guinea are native to subalpine moist grasslands at around 3,000 metres above sea level in the Central Highlands. Subgenera Rhododendron and Hymenanthes, together with section Pentanthera of subgenus Pentanthera are also represented to a lesser degree in the Mountainous areas of North America and Western Eurasia. Subgenus Tsutsusi is found in the maritime regions of East Asia (Japan, Korea, Taiwan, East China), but not in North America or Eurasia.

In the United States, native Rhododendron mostly occur in lowland and montane forests in the Pacific Northwest, California, the Northeast, and the Appalachian Mountains.

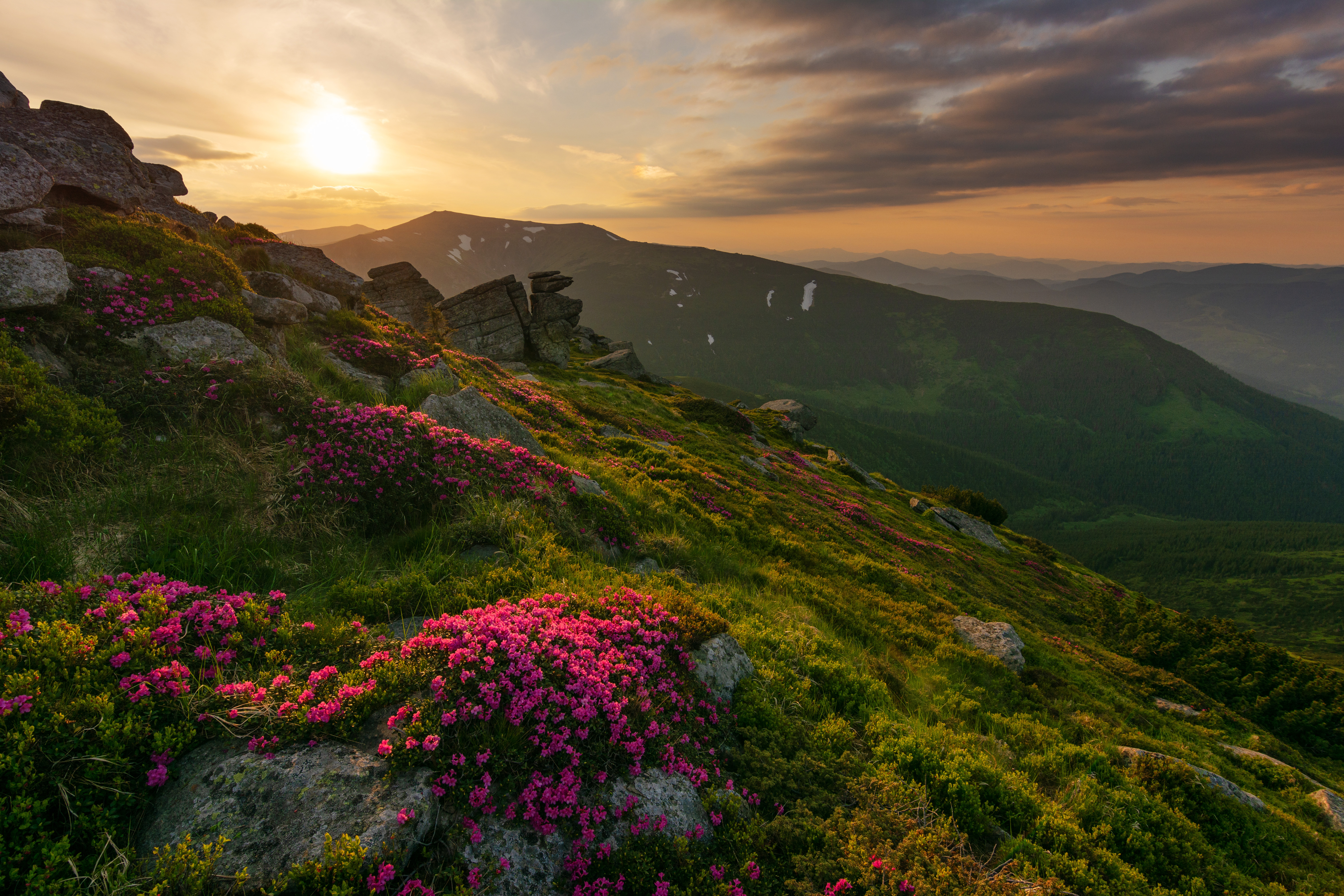
Rhododendron in the Carpathian Mountains of Western Ukraine

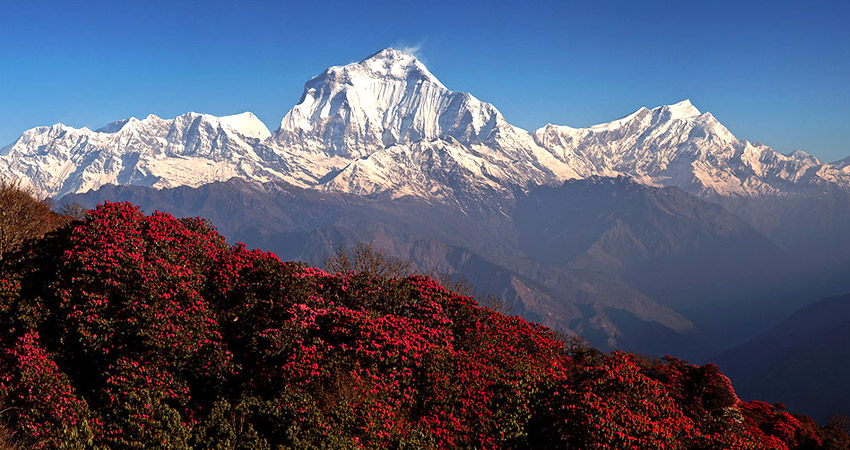
Rhododendrons (Guras) at Ghorepani, Nepal

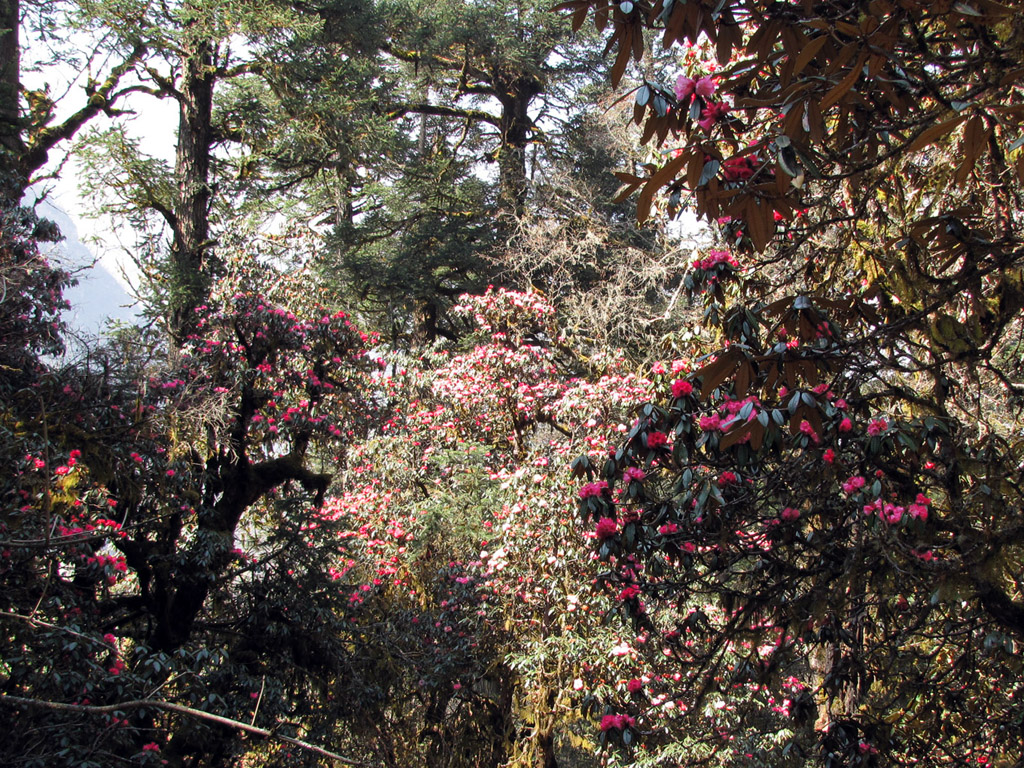
Rhododendron forest in Nepal

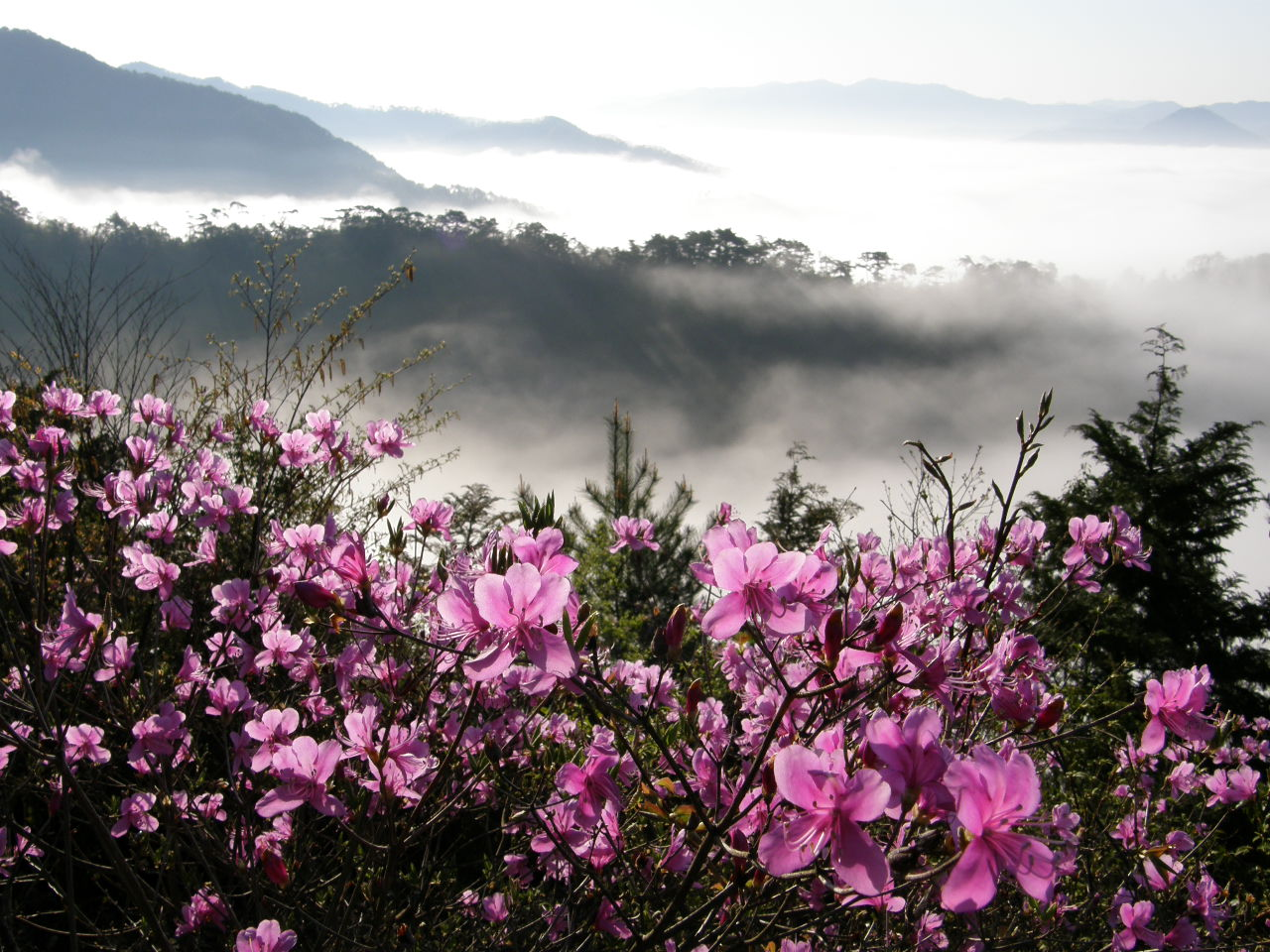
Rhododendron in Japan

== Ecology ==
=== As an invasive species ===
Rhododendron ponticum has become invasive in Ireland and the UK. It is an introduced species, spreading in woodland areas and replacing the natural understory. R. ponticum is difficult to eradicate, as its roots can make new shoots.

=== Insects ===
A number of insects either target rhododendrons or will opportunistically attack them. Rhododendron borers and various weevils are major pests of rhododendrons, and many caterpillars will preferentially devour them.

Rhododendron species are used as food plants by the larvae (caterpillars) of some butterflies and moths.

=== Diseases ===
Major diseases include Phytophthora root rot, stem and twig fungal dieback.

Rhododendron bud blast, a fungal condition that causes buds to turn brown and dry before they can open, is caused by the fungus Pycnostysanus azaleae, which may be brought to the plant by the rhododendron leafhopper, Graphocephala fennahi.

Rhododendron is not currently known to transmit any carcinogenic substances upon ingestion or touch.

== Conservation ==
In the UK the forerunner of the Rhododendron, Camellia and Magnolia Group, the Rhododendron Society was founded in 1916. while in Scotland species are being conserved by the Rhododendron Species Conservation Group.

== Cultivation ==
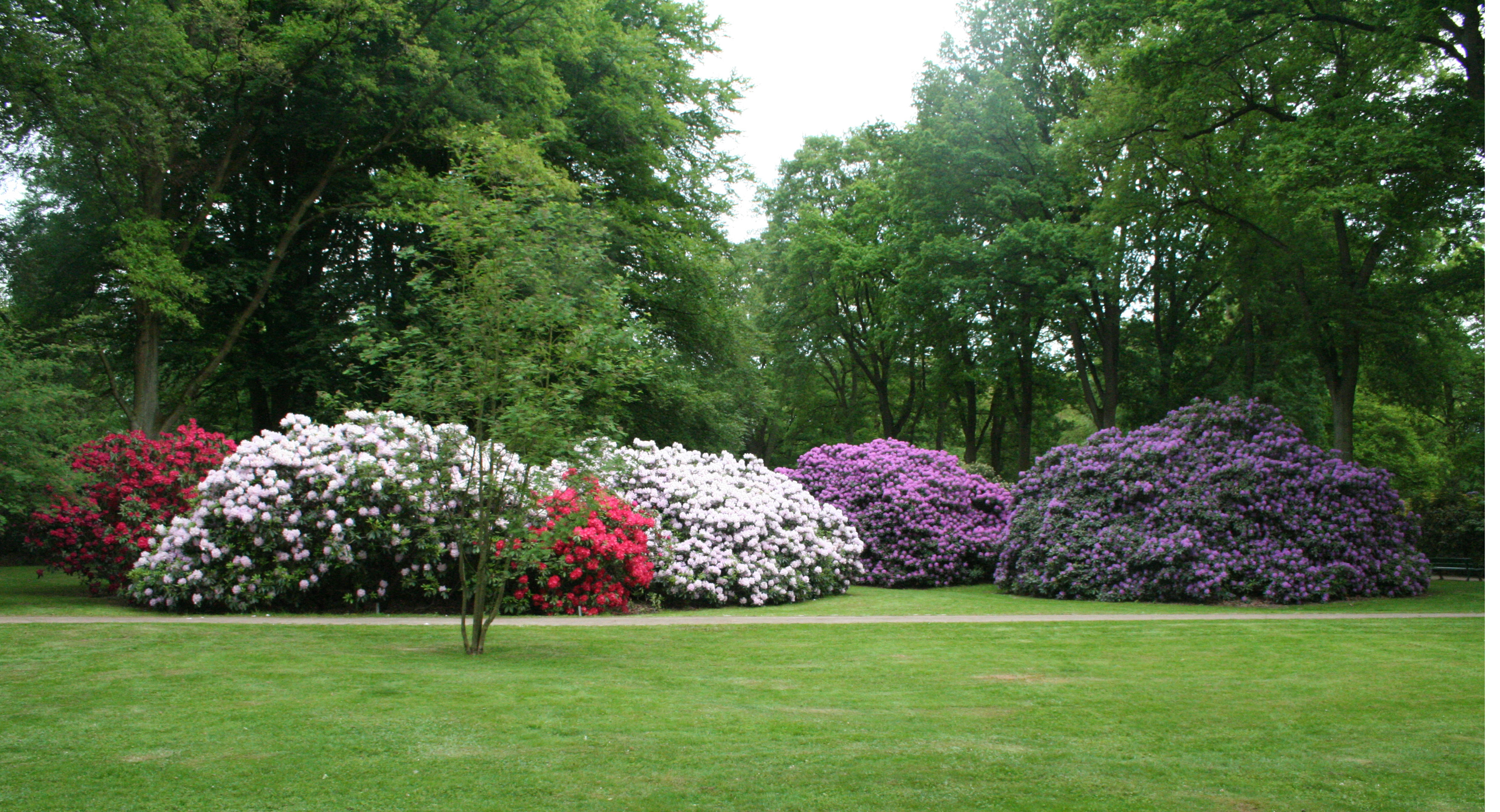
Rhododendron-Park Bremen, Germany

Both species and hybrid rhododendrons (including azaleas) are used extensively as ornamental plants in landscaping in many parts of the world, including both temperate and subtemperate regions. Many species and cultivars are grown commercially for the nursery trade.

Some rhododendrons, like Rhododendron russatum, have violet-blue flowers.

Rhododendrons can be propagated by air layering or stem cuttings. They can self-propagate by sending up shoots from the roots. Sometimes an attached branch that has drooped to the ground will root in damp mulch and the resulting rooted plant then can be cut off the parent rhododendron. They can also be reproduced by seed dispersal or by horticulturalists collecting the spent flower buds and saving and drying the seed for later germination and planting.

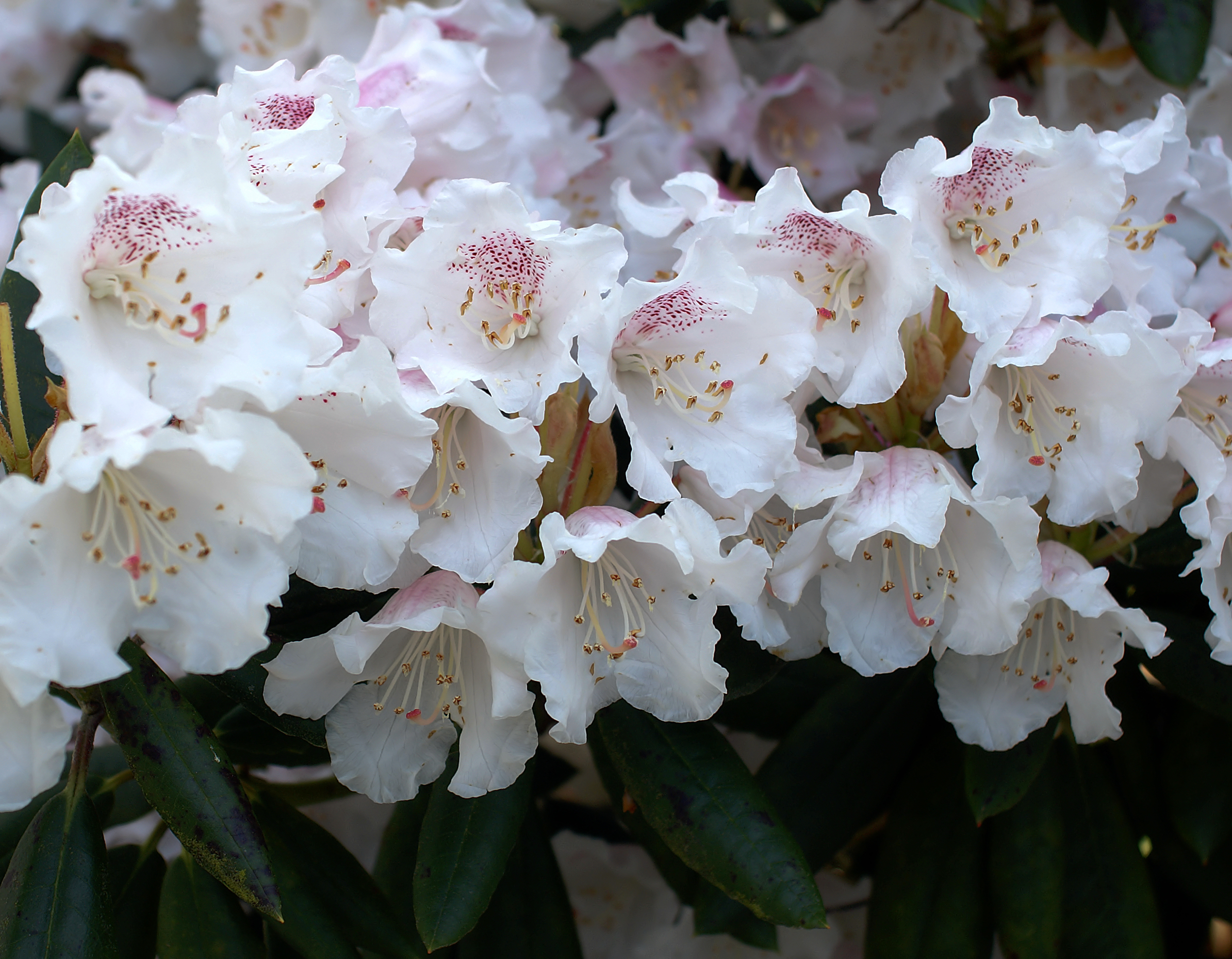
Rhododendron wardii var. puralbum

Rhododendrons are often valued in landscaping for their structure, size, flowers, and the fact that many of them are evergreen. Azaleas are frequently used around foundations and occasionally as hedges, and many larger-leafed rhododendrons lend themselves well to more informal plantings and woodland gardens, or as specimen plants. In some areas, larger rhododendrons can be pruned to encourage more tree-like form, with some species such as Rhododendron arboreum and R. falconeri eventually growing to a height of 10–15 m (32.81–49.21 ft) or more.

=== Commercial growing ===
Rhododendrons are grown commercially in many areas for sale, and seeds were occasionally collected in the wild, a practice now rare in most areas due to the Nagoya Protocol. Larger commercial growers often ship long distances; in the United States, most of them are on the west coast (Oregon, Washington state and California). Large-scale commercial growing often selects for different characteristics than hobbyist growers might want, such as resistance to root rot when overwatered, ability to be forced into budding early, ease of rooting or other propagation, and saleability.

=== Horticultural divisions ===
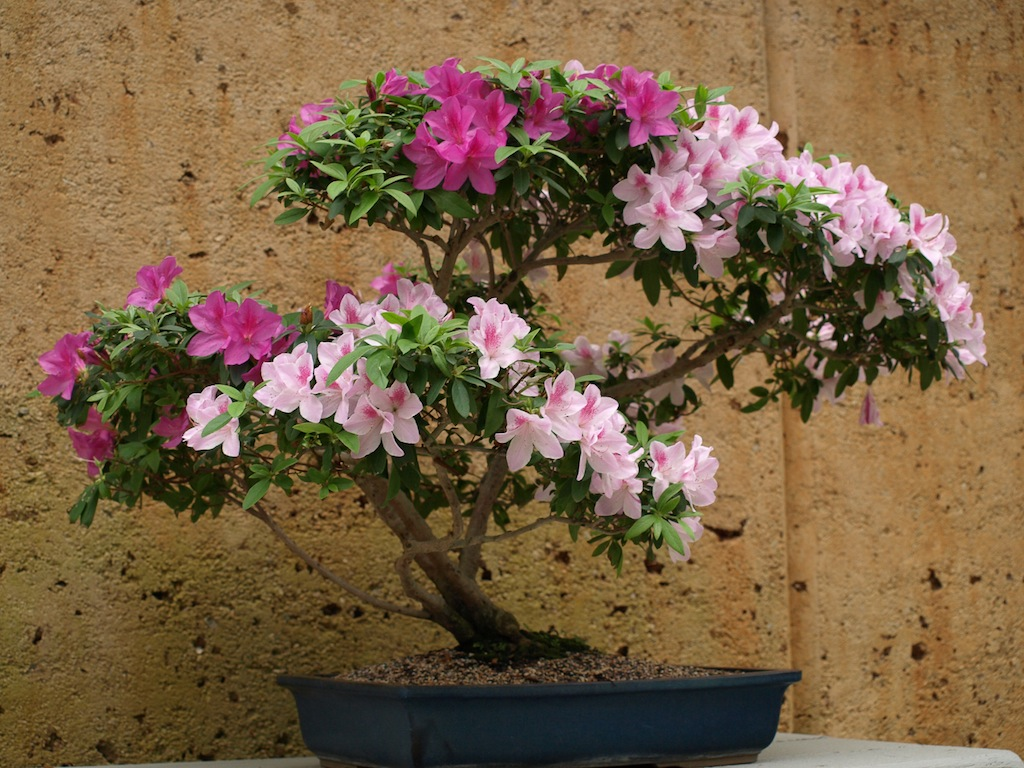
Bonsai

Horticulturally, rhododendrons may be divided into the following groups:

- Evergreen rhododendrons - large group of evergreen shrubs that vary greatly in size. Most rhododendron flowers are bell-shaped and have 10 stamens.
- Vireya (Malesian) rhododendrons: epiphytic tender shrubs
- Azaleas – group of shrubs which have smaller and thinner leaves than evergreen rhododendrons. They are generally medium-sized shrubs with smaller funnel-shaped flowers that usually have 5 stamens:
  - Deciduous hybrid azaleas:
    - Exbury hybrids – derived from the Knap Hill hybrids, developed by Lionel de Rothschild at the Exbury Estate in England.
    - Ghent (Gandavense) hybrids – Belgian raised
    - Knap Hill hybrids – developed by Anthony Waterer at the Knap Hill Nursery in England.
    - Mollis hybrids – Dutch and Belgian raised
    - New Zealand Ilam hybrids – derived from Knap Hill/Exbury hybrids
    - Occidentale hybrids – English raised
    - Rustica Flore Pleno hybrids – sweet-scented, double-flowered
  - Evergreen hybrid azaleas:
    - Gable hybrids – raised by Joseph B. Gable in Pennsylvania.
    - Glenn Dale hybrids – US raised complex hybrids
    - Indian (Indica) hybrids – mostly of Belgian origin
    - Kaempferi hybrids – Dutch raised
    - Kurume hybrids – Japanese raised
    - Kyushu hybrids – very hardy Japanese azaleas (to −30 °C)
    - Oldhamii hybrids – dwarf hybrids raised at Exbury, England
    - Satsuki hybrids – Japanese raised, originally for bonsai
    - Shammarello hybrids – raised in northern Ohio
    - Vuyk (Vuykiana) hybrids – raised in the Netherlands
- Azaleodendrons – semi-evergreen hybrids between deciduous azaleas and rhododendrons

=== Planting and care ===
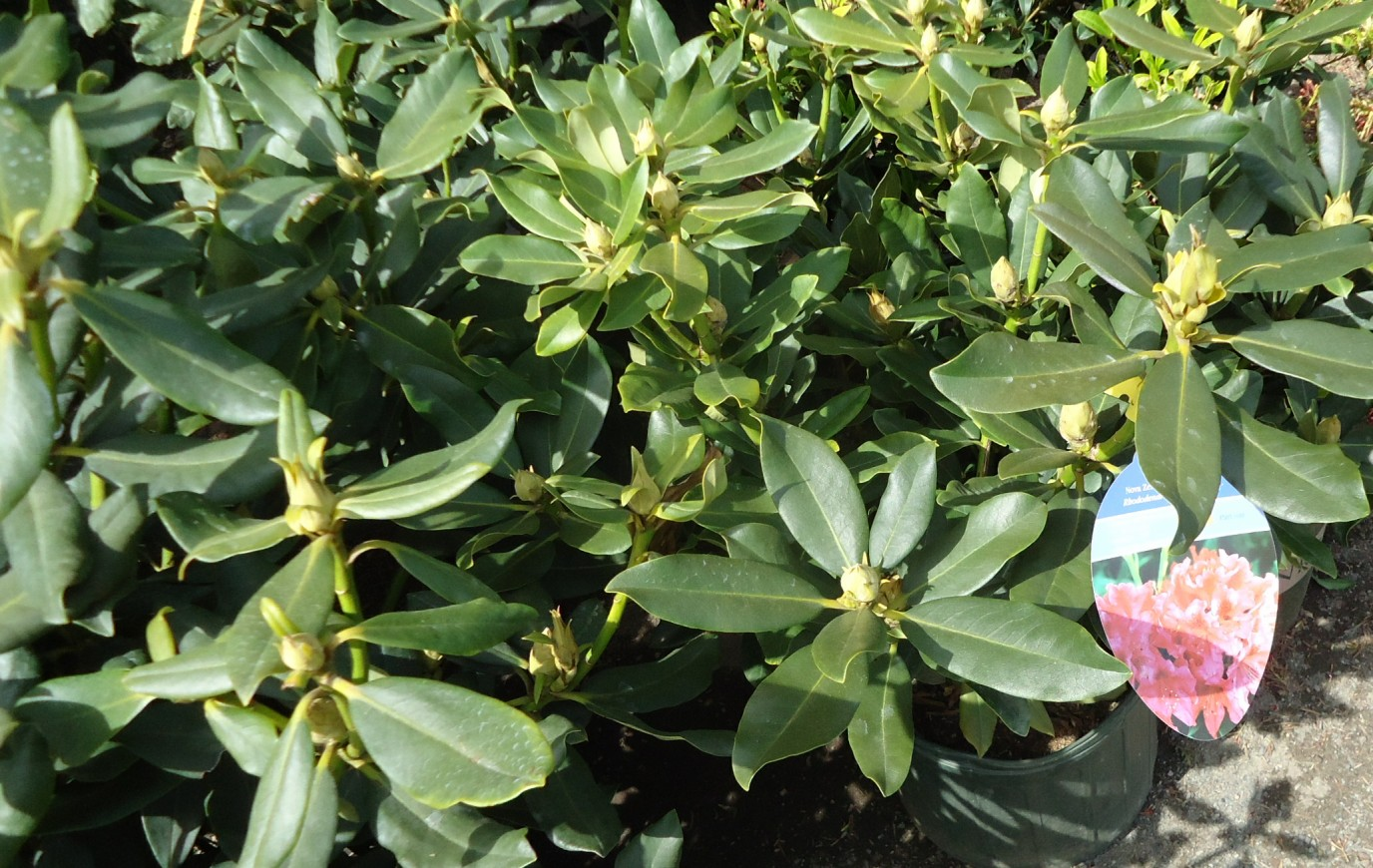
Nova Zembla rhododendrons growing in a nursery in New Jersey

Like other ericaceous plants, most rhododendrons prefer acid soils with a pH of roughly 4.5–5.5; some tropical Vireyas and a few other rhododendron species grow as epiphytes and require a planting mix similar to orchids. Rhododendrons have fibrous roots and prefer well-drained soils high in organic material. In areas with poorly drained or alkaline soils, rhododendrons are often grown in raised beds using media such as composted pine bark. Mulching and careful watering are important, especially before the plant is established.

A new calcium-tolerant stock of rhododendrons (trademarked as 'Inkarho') has been exhibited at the RHS Chelsea Flower Show in London (2011). Individual hybrids of rhododendrons have been grafted on to a rootstock on a single rhododendron plant that was found growing in a chalk quarry. The rootstock is able to grow in calcium-rich soil up to a pH of 7.5.

=== Hybrids ===
Rhododendrons are extensively hybridized in cultivation, and natural hybrids often occur in areas where species ranges overlap. There are over 28,000 cultivars of rhododendron in the International Rhododendron Registry held by the Royal Horticultural Society. Most have been bred for their flowers, but a few are of garden interest because of ornamental leaves and some for ornamental bark or stems. Some hybrids have fragrant flowers—such as the Loderi hybrids, created by crossing Rhododendron fortunei and R. griffithianum. Other examples include the PJM hybrids, formed from a cross between R. carolinianum and R. dauricum, and named after Peter J. Mezitt of Weston Nurseries, Massachusetts.

== Toxicity ==
Some species of rhododendron are poisonous to grazing animals because of a toxin called grayanotoxin in their pollen and nectar. People have been known to become ill from eating mad honey made by bees feeding on rhododendron and azalea flowers. Xenophon described the odd behaviour of Greek soldiers after having consumed honey in a village surrounded by Rhododendron ponticum during the march of the Ten Thousand in 401 BCE. Pompey's soldiers reportedly suffered lethal casualties following the consumption of mad honey that was deliberately left behind by Pontic forces in 67 BCE during the Third Mithridatic War. Later, it was recognized that honey resulting from these plants has a slightly hallucinogenic and laxative effect. The suspect rhododendrons are R. ponticum and R. luteum (formerly Azalea pontica), both found in northern Asia Minor. Eleven similar cases during the 1980s have been documented in Istanbul, Turkey. Rhododendron is extremely toxic to horses, with some animals dying within a few hours of ingesting the plant, although most horses tend to avoid it if they have access to good forage. Rhododendron, including its stems, leaves and flowers, contains toxins that, if ingested by a cat's stomach, can cause seizures and even coma and death.

== Uses ==
Rhododendron species have long been used in traditional medicine.

In Nepal, the flower is considered edible and consumed for its sour taste. The pickled flower can last for months, and the flower juice is also marketed. The flower, fresh or dried, is added to fish curry in the belief that it will soften the bones. The juice of rhododendron flower is used to make a squash called burans (named after the flower) in the hilly regions of Uttarakhand, India. It is admired for its distinctive flavour and colour.

=== Labrador tea ===
The herbal tea called Labrador tea (not a true tea) is made from one of three closely related species:

- Rhododendron tomentosum (Northern Labrador tea, previously Ledum palustre)
- Rhododendron groenlandicum, (Bog Labrador tea, previously Ledum groenlandicum or Ledum latifolium)
- Rhododendron neoglandulosum, (Western Labrador tea, or trapper's tea, previously Ledum glandulosum)

== In culture ==
In the language of flowers, the rhododendron symbolizes danger and to beware.

In Uttarakhand, in north India, the Buransh flower is deeply embedded in local culture, playing a significant role in festivals like Holi and weddings, where it is used in garlands and decorations to bless attendees. The flower is also utilized in making a healthful, antioxidant-rich juice that is popular during local festivities and summer months. Additionally, Buransh flowers are incorporated into local arts and crafts, where they are used to make colourful necklaces and jewelry, symbolizing the spiritual and physical prosperity of the community.

Rhododendron arboreum (Nepali: लालीगुराँस, laligurans) is the national flower of Nepal.

R. ponticum is the state flower of Indian-administered Jammu and Kashmir and Pakistan-administered Azad Kashmir. Rhododendron niveum is the state tree of Sikkim in India. Rhododendron arboreum is also the state tree of the state of Uttarakhand, India. Pink rhododendron (Rhododendron campanulatum) is the state flower of Himachal Pradesh, India. Rhododendron is also the provincial flower of Jiangxi, China, and Jeju Province, South Korea, as well as the state flower of Nagaland, India.

Rhododendron maximum, the most widespread rhododendron of the Appalachian Mountains, is the state flower of the US state of West Virginia, and is in the Flag of West Virginia.

Rhododendron macrophyllum, a widespread rhododendron of the Pacific Northwest, is the state flower of the US state of Washington.

Amongst the Zomi tribes in India and Myanmar, "Rhododendrons" called "Ngeisok" is used in a poetic manner to signify a lady.

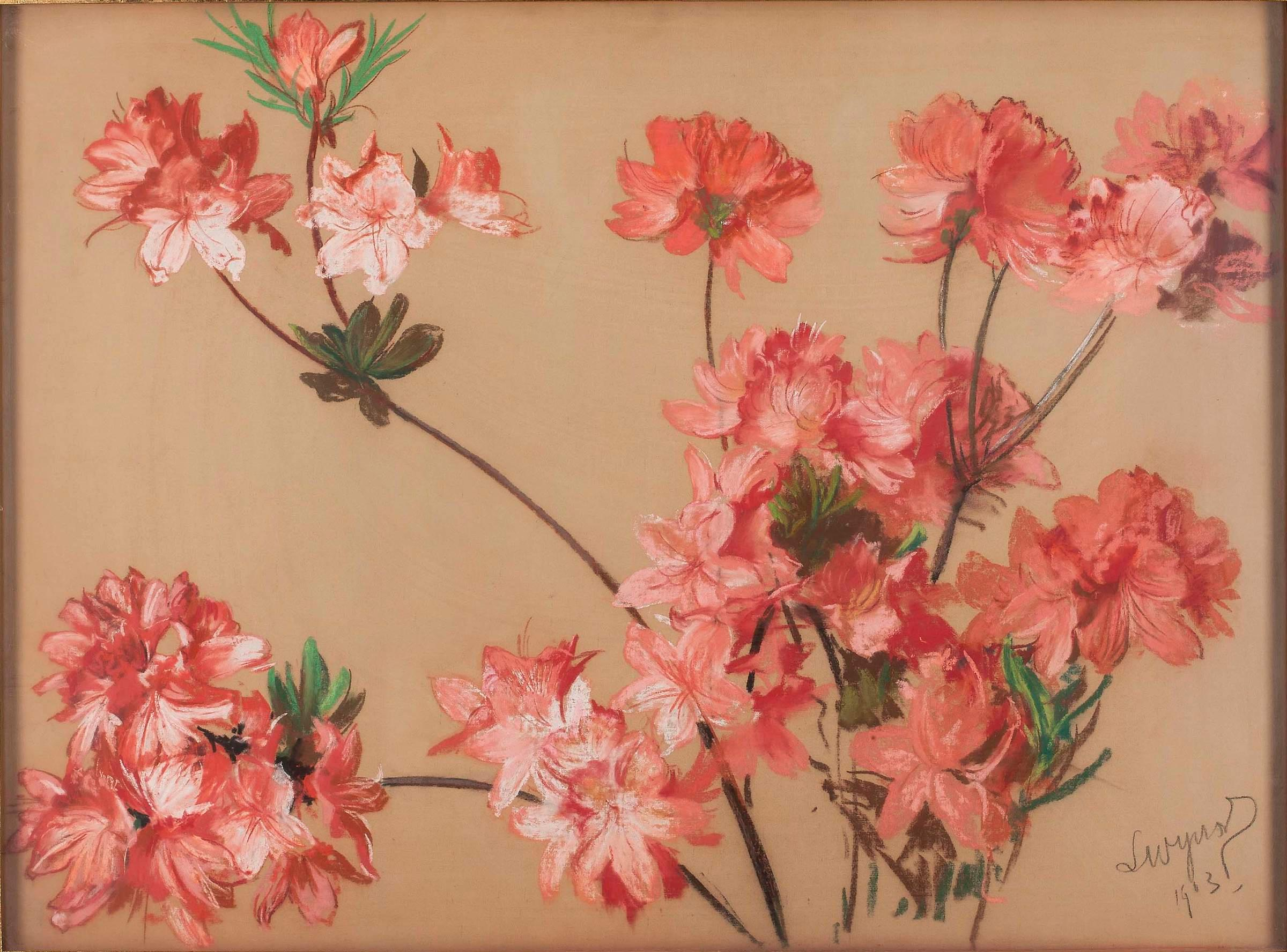
Leon Wyczółkowski, Pink Rhododendrons, 1903

=== In media ===
The nineteenth-century American poet and essayist Ralph Waldo Emerson in 1834 wrote a poem titled "The Rhodora, On Being Asked, Whence Is the Flower".

Rhododendrons play a role and are soliloquized in James Joyce's Ulysses. The flowers are referenced throughout Daphne Du Maurier's novel Rebecca (1938) and in Sharon Creech's young adult novel Walk Two Moons (1994). British author Jasper Fforde also uses rhododendron as a motif throughout many of his books, e.g. the Thursday Next series and Shades of Grey (2009).

The effects of R. ponticum were mentioned in the 2009 film Sherlock Holmes as a proposed way to arrange a fake execution. It was also mentioned in the third episode of Season 2 of BBC's Sherlock, speculated to have been a part of Sherlock's fake death scheme.

== See also ==
- List of Award of Garden Merit rhododendrons
- List of sections in subgenus Rhododendron

== Bibliography ==
=== Books and book chapters ===
- Augustin Pyramus de Candolle (1838). "Rhododendron". Prodromus systemati naturalis regni vegetabilis sive enumeratio contracta ordinum, generum specierumque plantarum huc usque cognitarum, juxta methodi naturalis normas digesta (in Latin). Vol. 7. Paris: Treuttel et Würtz. pp. 719–728. (also available online at Gallica)
- Sweet, Robert (1838). The British Flower Garden. The Two Series. Vol. I. Drawings by E.D. Smith. London: James Ridgway & Sons.
- Hooker, Joseph Dalton (1849). Hooker, William Jackson (ed.). The Rhododendrons of Sikkim-Himalaya: being an account, botanical and geographical, of the rhododendrons recently discovered in the mountains of eastern Himalaya, from drawings and descriptions made on the spot, during a government botanical mission to that country (2nd ed.). London: Reeve, Benham, and Reeve. doi:10.5962/bhl.title.11178.
- Luteyn, James Leonard & O'Brien, Mary E., eds. (1980). Contributions Toward a Classification of Rhododendron: Proceedings of the International Rhododendron Conference. International Rhododendron Conference (The New York Botanical Garden, 15–17 May 1978). New York: New York Botanical Garden Press. ISBN 978-0-89327-221-0.
- Davidian, H.H. (1982–1995). The Rhododendron Species. Portland, Oregon: Timber Press. In four volumes: Vol. I. Lepidotes ISBN 0-917304-71-3, Vol. II. Elepidotes. Arboreum-Lacteum ISBN 0-88192-109-2, Vol. III. Elepidotes Continued, Neriiflorum-Thomsonii, Azaleastrum and Camtschaticum ISBN 0-88192-168-8, Vol. IV. Azaleas ISBN 0-88192-311-7.
- Cox, Peter A. & Cox, Kenneth N. E. (1997). The Encyclopedia of Rhododendron Species. Glendoick Publishing. ISBN 978-0-9530533-0-8..
- Cullen, James (2005). Hardy Rhododendron Species: A Guide To Identification. Timber Press. ISBN 978-0881927238.
- Blazich, Frank A. & Rowe, D. Bradley (July 2008). "Rhododendron L., rhododendron and azalea" (PDF). In Bonner, Franklin T. & Karrfalt, Robert P. (eds.). The Woody Plant Seed Manual (PDF). Agr. Hdbk. Vol. 727. Washington, D.C.: U.S. Dept. Agr. For. Serv. pp. 943–951. Archived (PDF) from the original on 9 October 2022.

=== Articles ===
- Black, Michael (October 1969). "Historical Survey of Rhododendron Collecting With Emphasis on its Close Associations with Horticulture". The Quarterly Bulletin of the American Rhododendron Society. 23 (4).
- Magor, Walter (Fall 1990). "A History of Rhododendrons". Journal American Rhododendron Society. 44 (4).
- Goetsch, Loretta A.; Eckert, Andrew J.; Hall, Benjamin D. (July–September 2005). "The molecular systematics of Rhododendron (Ericaceae): a phylogeny based upon RPB2 gene sequences". Systematic Botany. 30 (3): 616–626. Bibcode:2005SysBo..30..616G. doi:10.1600/0363644054782170. S2CID 51949019.

=== Subdivisions ===
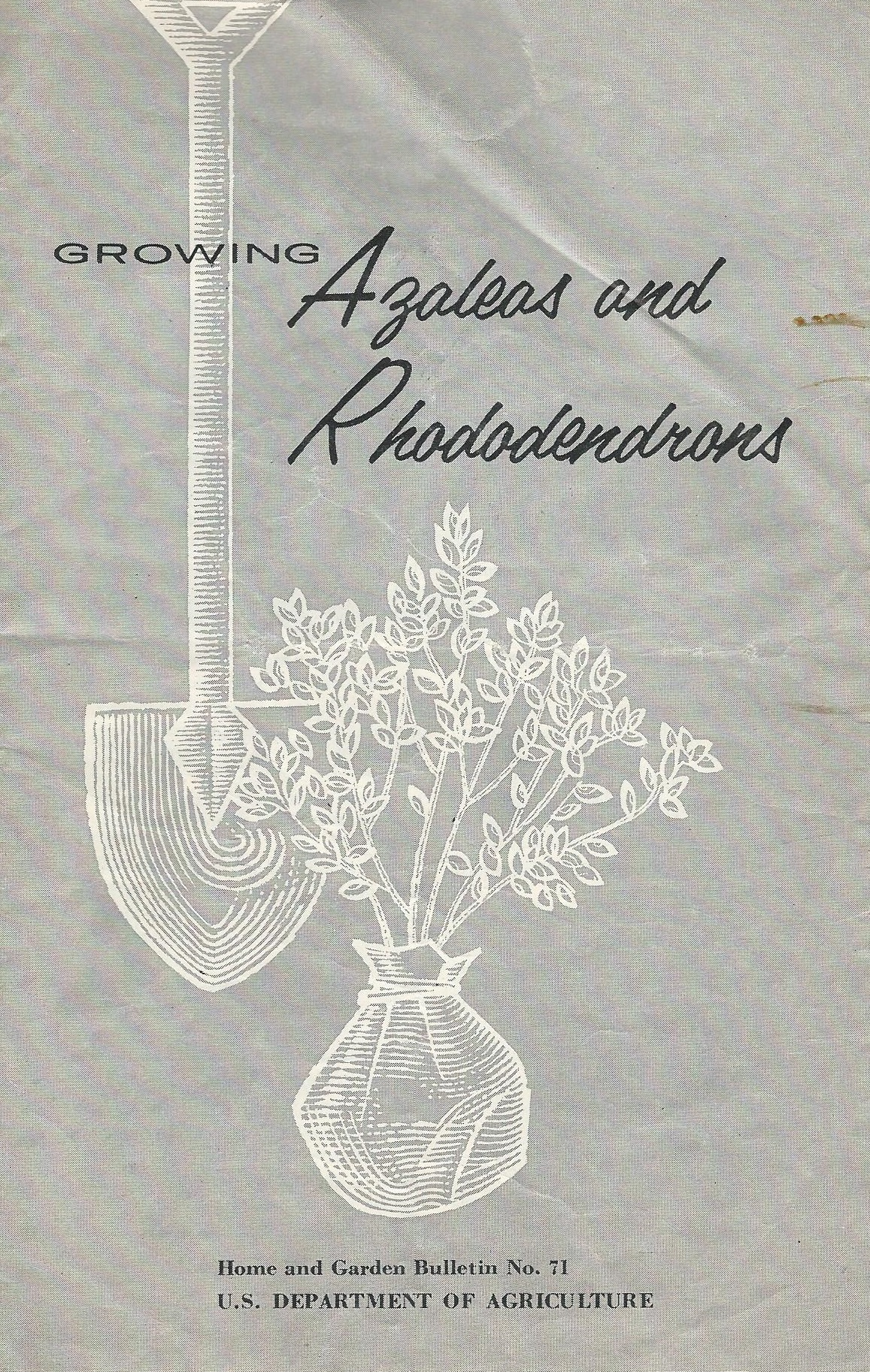
The cultural requirements of azaleas and rhododendrons are so similar that this 1960 U.S. Department of Agriculture publication treated them together.

==== Azaleas ====
- Wilson, E.H.; Rehder, A. (1921). A Monograph of Azaleas; Rhododendron Subgenus Anthodendron. Publications of the Arnold Aboretum, no. 9. Cambridge: University Press.
- Creech, John L. (1955). "An Embryological Study in the Rhododendron Subgenus Anthodendron Endl". Botanical Gazette. 116 (3): 234–243. doi:10.1086/335866. JSTOR 2473343. S2CID 83861676.

==== Tsutsusi ====
- Chamberlain, D.F. & Rae, S.J. (1990). "A revision of Rhododendron. IV. Subgenus Tsutsusi". Edinburgh Journal of Botany. 47 (2): 89–200. doi:10.1017/S096042860000319X.
- Powell, E. Ann; Kron, Kathleen A (2004). "Molecular systematics of Rhododendron subgenus Tsutsusi (Rhodoreae, Ericoideae, Ericaceae)". Botany 2004. Abstract ID:147.
- Kron, K.A. & Powell, E.A. (March 2009). "Molecular systematics of Rhododendron subgenus Tsutsusi (Rhodoreae, Ericoideae, Ericaceae)". Edinburgh Journal of Botany. 66 (1): 81–95. doi:10.1017/S0960428609005071.
- ZHANG Yue-Jiao; JIN Xiao-Feng; DING Bing-Yang; ZHU Jing-Ping (March 2009). "Pollen morphology of Rhododendron subgen. Tsutsusi and its systematic implications". Journal of Systematics and Evolution. 47 (2): 123–138. Bibcode:2009JSyEv..47..123Z. doi:10.1111/j.1759-6831.2009.00011.x. S2CID 86594487.
- JIN Xiao-Feng; DING Bing-Yang; ZHANG Yue-Jiao; HONG De-Yuan (2010). "A Taxonomic Revision Of Rhododendron subg. Tsutsusi sect. Brachycalyx (Ericaceae)". Annals of the Missouri Botanical Garden. 97 (2): 163–190. Bibcode:2010AnMBG..97..163X. doi:10.3417/2007139. S2CID 86507576.

==== Vireya ====
- Sleumer, Hermann Otto (1966). An account of rhododendron in Malesia. Groningen: P. Noordhoff.. A reprint from Flora Malesiana ser. I, vol. 6, part 4. Pages 473 through 674.
- Leach, David G. (Winter 1978). "The Discovery of the Malaysian Rhododendrons". The Quarterly Bulletin of the American Rhododendron Society. 32 (1).
- Argent, G. (2006). Rhododendrons of subgenus Vireya. Royal Horticultural Society. ISBN 978-1-902896-61-8.
- Brown, Gillian K.; Craven, Lyn A.; Udovicic, Frank; Ladiges, Pauline Y. (August 2006). "Phylogenetic relationships of Rhododendron section Vireya (Ericaceae) inferred from the ITS nrDNA region" (PDF). Australian Systematic Botany. 19 (4): 329–342. Bibcode:2006AuSyB..19..329B. doi:10.1071/SB05019. Archived from the original on 15 July 2014.
- Hall, B.D.; Craven, L.A. & Goetsch, L.A. (2006). "The Taxonomy of Subsection Pseudovireya: Two distinctly different taxa within subsection Pseudovireya and their Relation to the Rooting of section Vireya within subgenus Rhododendron". Rhododendron Species. 1: 91–97. Yearbook of the Rhododendron Species Foundation, Federal Way, WA.
- Craven, L.A.; Goetsch, L.A.; Hall, B.D.; Brown, G.K. (2008). "Classification of the Vireya group of Rhododendron (Ericaceae)". Blumea - Biodiversity, Evolution and Biogeography of Plants. 53 (2): 435–442. Bibcode:2008Blume..53..435C. doi:10.3767/000651908X608070.
- Goetsch, L.A.; Craven, L.A.; Hall, B.D. (2011). "Major speciation accompanied the dispersal of Vireya Rhododendrons (Ericaceae, Rhododendron sect. Schistanthe) through the Malayan archipelago: Evidence from nuclear gene sequences". Taxon. 60 (4): 1015–1028. Bibcode:2011Taxon..60.1015G. doi:10.1002/tax.604006.
- Adams, Peter (Fall 2012). "Evolution, Adaptive Radiation and Vireya Rhododendrons - Part I" (PDF). Journal American Rhododendron Society: 201–203. Archived from the original (PDF) on 20 August 2016.
- Adams, Peter (Spring 2013). "Evolution, Adaptive Radiation and Vireya Rhododendrons – Part II" (PDF). Journal American Rhododendron Society: 74–76. Archived from the original (PDF) on 20 August 2016.
- Fayaz, A. (2012). Biodiversity of the Vireya group of Rhododendron L. (Ericaceae) collections in New Zealand and their potential contribution to international conservation (PhD). Turitea, New Zealand: Massey University.

==== Separate genera ====
- Craven, L.A. (April 2011). "Diplarche and Menziesia transferred to Rhododendron (Ericaceae)". Blumea - Biodiversity, Evolution and Biogeography of Plants. 56 (1): 33–35. Bibcode:2011Blume..56...33C. doi:10.3767/000651911X568594.

== Additional resources ==
Records of the Rhododendron Society of America reside at the Albert and Shirley Small Special Collections Library at the University of Virginia.
