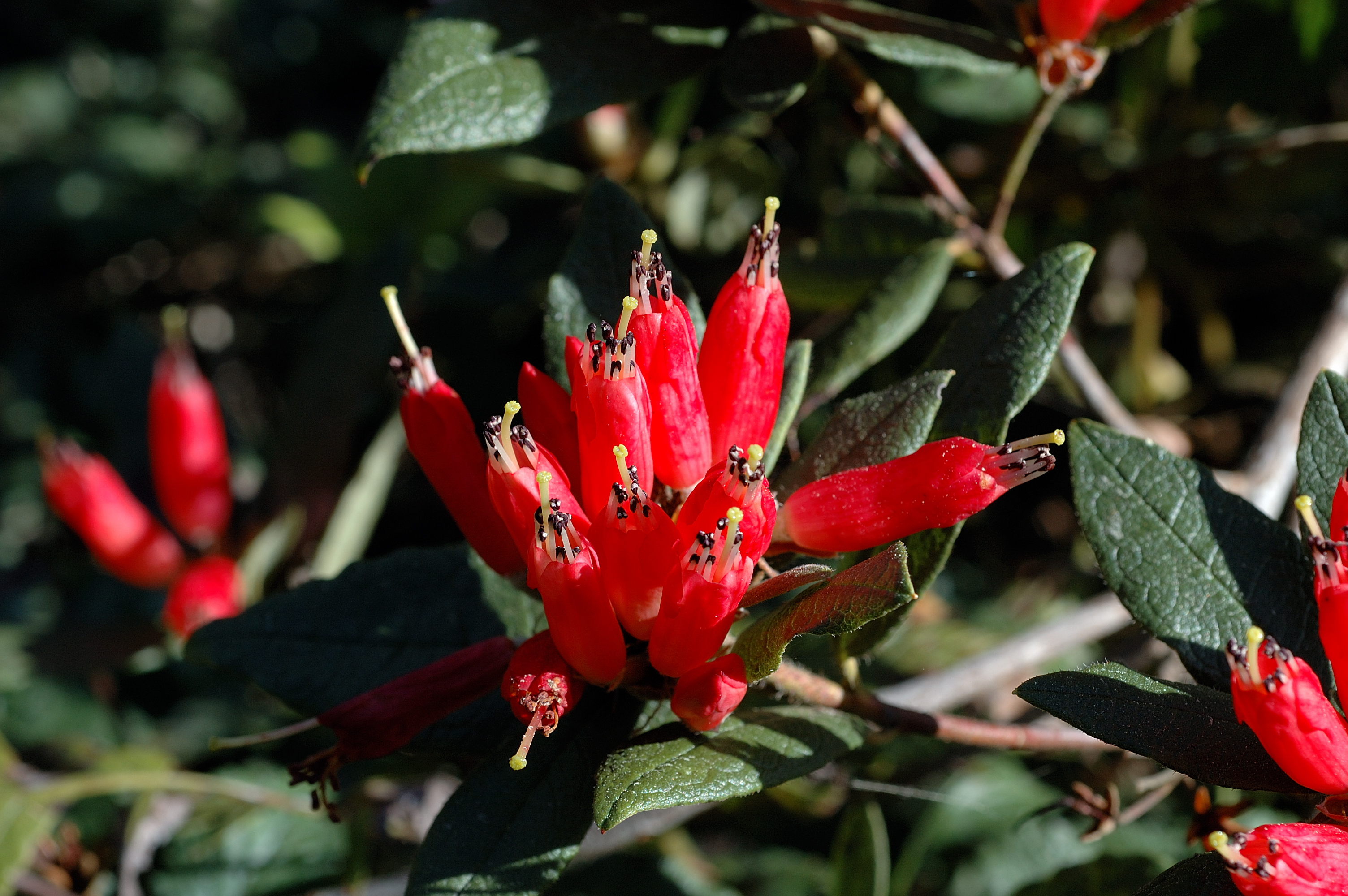

Scientific classification
- Kingdom: Plantae
- Clade: Embryophytes
- Clade: Tracheophytes
- Clade: Spermatophytes
- Clade: Angiosperms
- Clade: Eudicots
- Clade: Asterids
- Order: Ericales
- Family: Ericaceae
- Genus: Rhododendron
- Species: R. spinuliferum

Binomial name
- Rhododendron spinuliferum Franch.

= Rhododendron spinuliferum =

Species of plant

Rhododendron spinuliferum is a species of flowering plant in the family Ericaceae, native to Yunnan and Sichuan, China.

== Description ==
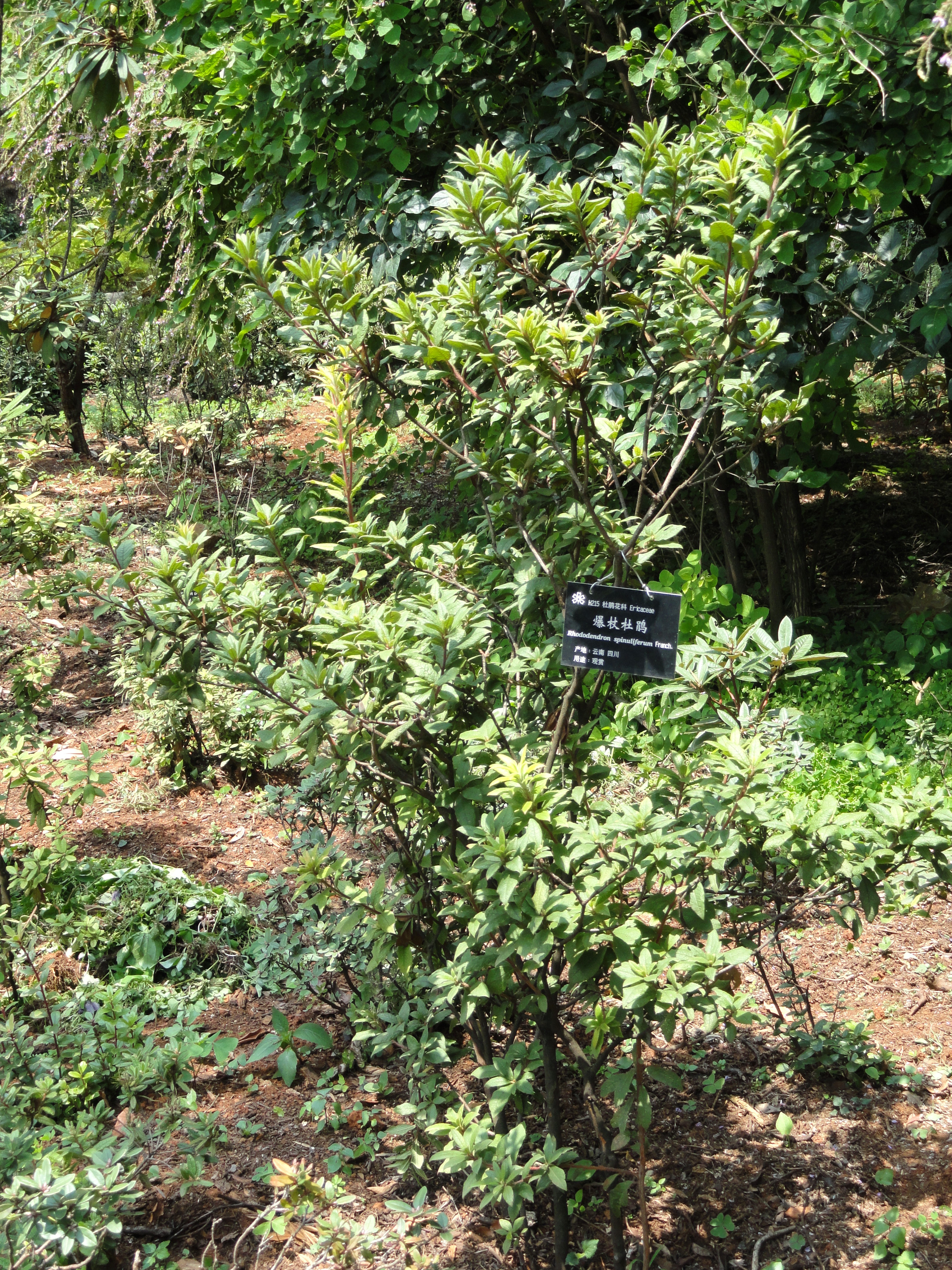
habit, cult. Kunming Botanic Garden

Rhododendron spinuliferum grows as an evergreen shub 0.5 to 3.5 m (1.6 to 11.5 ft) high. It has delicate oval or lanceolate (spear-shaped) leaves 3 to 10.5 cm (1.2 to 4.1 in) long by 1.8 to 3.8 cm (0.71 to 1.50 in) wide, with cuneate (wedge-shaped) bases and pointed tips. The red tube-shaped flowers appear from February to June. These tubular corollas and tapered ends are unusual for the genus.

== Taxonomy ==
French botanist Adrien René Franchet described Rhododendron spinuliferum in 1895. Two subspecies are recognised. Within the genus Rhododendron, it lies in the subgenus Rhododendron and section Rhododendron. Analysis of its DNA shows it is most closely related to R. triflorum, the two sister species having R. keiskei as the next closest relative. However, the section appears to be polyphyletic, with these species early offshoots of the section Vireya.

== Distribution and habitat ==
The range is southwestern Sichuan and northeastern to western Yunnan at altitudes ranging from 1,900 to 2,500 m (6,200 to 8,200 ft), in coniferous forests with Keteleeria, or mixed conifer and deciduous forest with oak (Quercus), in shaded areas and thickets.

== Cultivation and uses ==
In cultivation, Rhododendron spinuliferum grows best in acidic soils of pH 4–6 with a shady aspect and significant organic material in the soil, although excess shade will result in few flowers and leggy habit. Readily propagated by seed or cuttings, it flowers in four to five years from seed.

Hybrid cultivars derived from this species include:

- Rhododendron 'Crossbill' (spinuliferum × lutescens)
- Rhododendron 'Seta' A.M. (spinuliferum × moupinense)
- Rhododendron 'Spinulosum'

=== Chinese traditional medicine ===
Rhododendron spinuliferum has been used in Chinese traditional medicine to remove phlegm and treat asthma.
