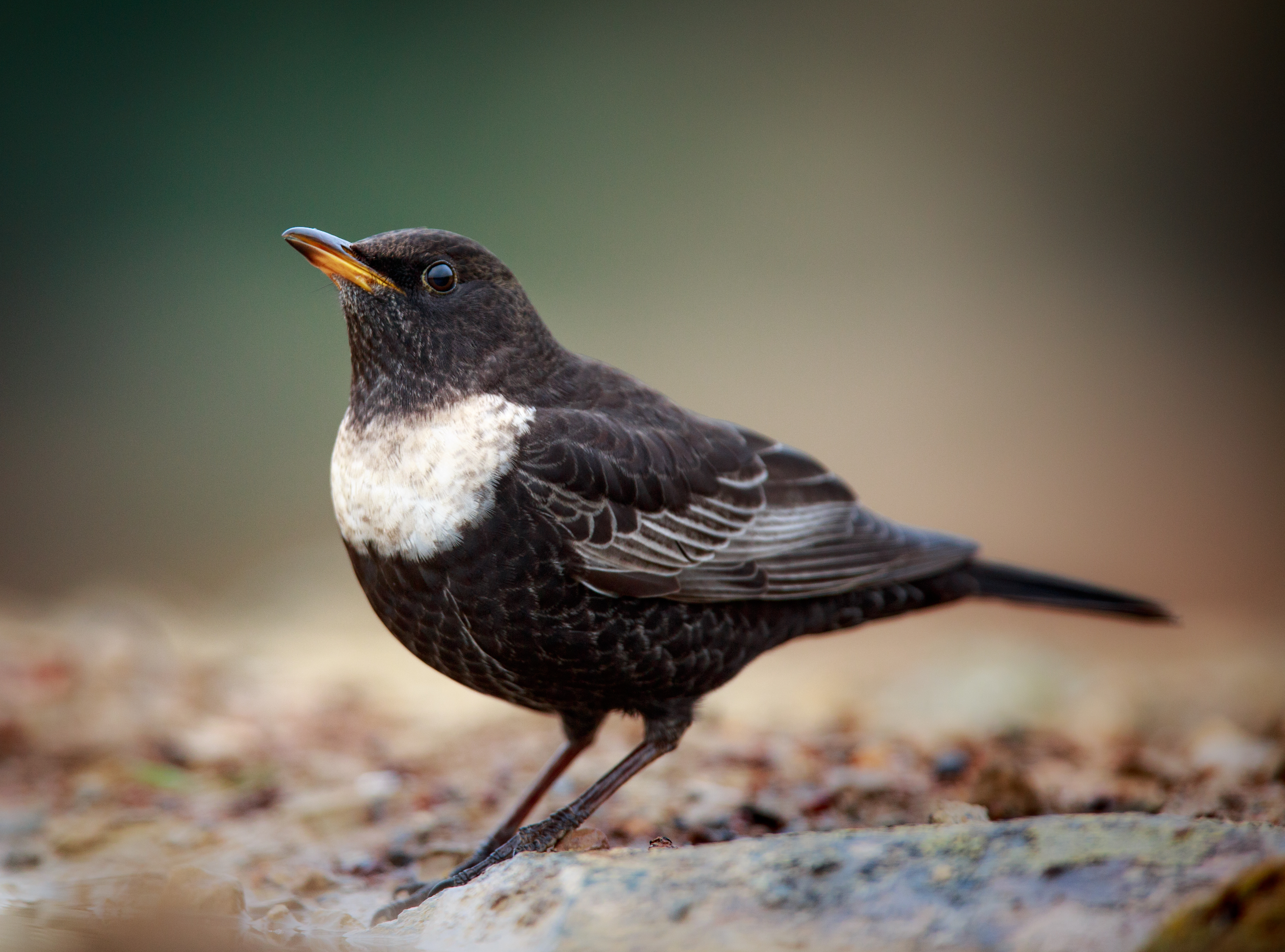
- Male T. t. torquatus in Spain
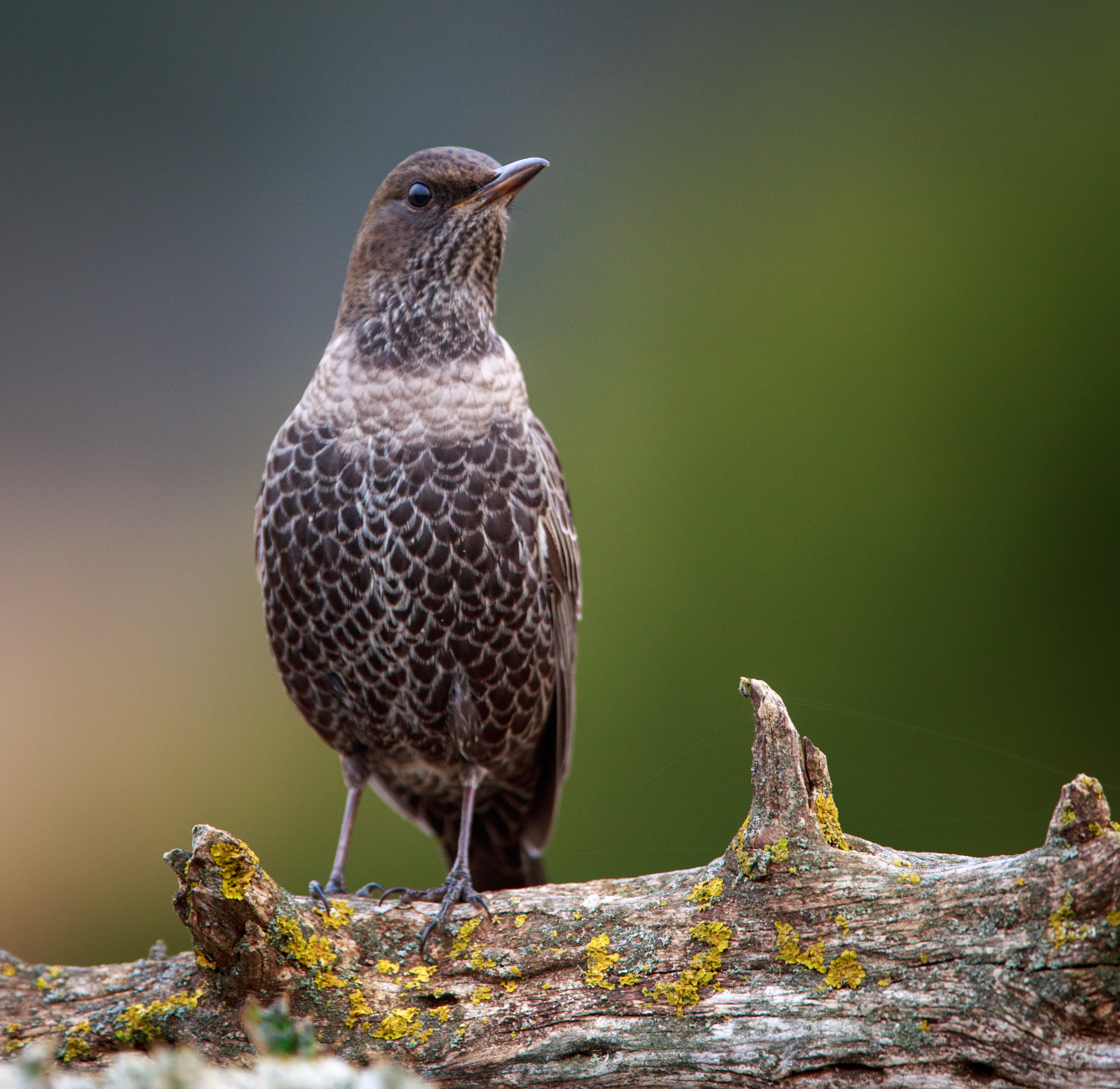
- Female T. t. torquatus in Spain; Bird's call

Conservation status
- Least Concern (IUCN 3.1)

Scientific classification
- Kingdom: Animalia
- Phylum: Chordata
- Class: Aves
- Order: Passeriformes
- Family: Turdidae
- Genus: Turdus
- Species: T. torquatus

Binomial name
- Turdus torquatus Linnaeus, 1758
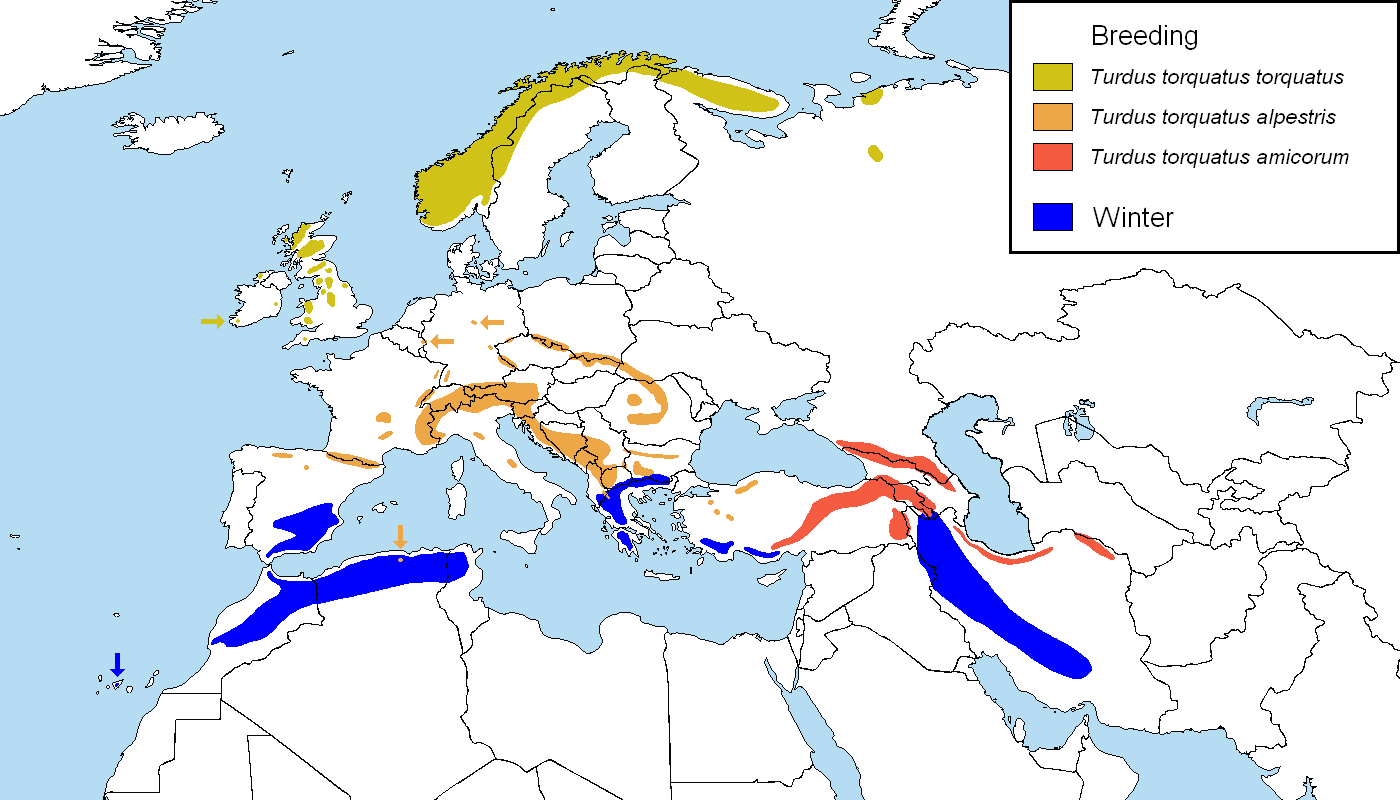
- Approximate range with subspecies

= Ring ouzel =

Species of birds mainly in Europe

The ring ouzel (Turdus torquatus) is a mainly European member of the thrush family Turdidae. It is a medium-sized thrush, 23–24 centimetres (9.1–9.4 in) in length and weighing 90–138 grams (3.2–4.9 oz). The male is predominantly black with a conspicuous white crescent across its breast. Females are browner and duller than males, and young birds may lack the pale chest markings altogether. In all but the northernmost part of its range, this is a high-altitude species, with three subspecies breeding in mountains from Ireland east to Iran. It breeds in open mountain areas with some trees or shrubs, the latter often including juniper and other treeline conifers, rowan, bilberry, heather, and hairy alpenrose. It is a migratory bird, leaving the breeding areas to winter in southern Europe, North Africa and Turkey, typically in mountains with junipers. The typical clutch is 3–6 brown-flecked pale blue or greenish-blue eggs. They are incubated almost entirely by the female, with hatching normally occurring after 13 days. The altricial, downy chicks fledge in another 14 days and are dependent on their parents for about 12 days after fledging.

The ring ouzel is omnivorous, eating invertebrates, particularly insects and earthworms, some small vertebrates, and a wide range of fruit. Most animal prey is caught on the ground. During spring migration and the breeding season, invertebrates dominate the adult's diet and are also fed to the chicks. Later in the year, fruit becomes more important, particularly the common juniper.

With an extensive range and a large population, the ring ouzel is evaluated as least concern by the International Union for Conservation of Nature (IUCN). There are significant declines in several countries; suspected causes include climate change, human disturbance, hunting and outdoor leisure activities. Loss of junipers may also be a factor in some areas. Natural hazards include predation by mammalian carnivores and birds of prey, and locally there may also be competition from other large thrushes such as the common blackbird, mistle thrush and fieldfare.

== Etymology ==
"Ouzel" is an old name for the common blackbird, the word being cognate with the German Amsel. "Ouzel" may also be applied to a group of superficially similar but more distantly related birds, the dippers, the European representative of which was sometimes known as the "water ouzel". "Ring Ouzel" was first used by John Ray in his 1674 Collection of English Words not Generally Used and became established with his 1678 book The Ornithology of Francis Willughby of Middleton in the County of Warwick. As with the English term, the scientific name also refers to the male's prominent white neck crescent, being derived from the Latin words turdus, "thrush", and torquatus, "collared". Old and local names for the ring ouzel include "fell blackbird", "hill blackbird", "moor blackbird", "rock ouzel" and "mountain blackbird".

== Taxonomy ==
The ring ouzel was first described by Carl Linnaeus under its current scientific name in his 1758 10th edition of Systema Naturae. He noted earlier descriptions by Francis Willughby and Eleazar Albin, both of whom gave it the name Merula torquata. (Note: Although scientists had been coining names in the previous century, the universally accepted starting point of modern taxonomy for animals is set at 1758, with the publishing of Linnaeus' 10th edition of Systema Naturae.)

There are 104 species of medium to large thrushes in the genus Turdus. They are characterised by rounded heads, medium or longish pointed wings, and usually melodious songs.

A 2020 study of the genetics of Turdus suggested that the genus arose about 9.37 million years ago (Mya), expanding out of Africa around 7.2 Mya, and diverging into Palearctic and Oriental groups about 5.7 Mya. Further radiation from Africa to the Americas followed at about 5.3 Mya. Details of the study suggest that the ring ouzel, a member of the Eurasian group, may be more closely related to Naumann's and dusky thrushes than to the superficially more similar common blackbird.

=== Subspecies ===
The ring ouzel has three recognised subspecies:

Image	Scientific name	Distribution	Identification
Cairngorm, Scotland	T. t. torquatus Linnaeus, 1758	Breeds Ireland (rare), Great Britain to Scandinavia and the far northwest of Russia; winters from Spain south to northwest Africa and the Canary Islands	Black plumage with moderate pale fringes
Hohe Tauern, Austria	T. t. alpestris (C. L. Brehm, 1831)	Breeds in the mountains of Iberia, the Pyrenees, the Alps, the Carpathians, and the Balkan Mountains, and with small outlying populations in the Atlas Mountains of Algeria, the Haut Vosges of Belgium, and the higher hills of northern Germany; winters in northern Africa, southern Europe and southern Turkey	All body feathering with strong pale fringes, giving a very 'scaly' appearance
Artashavan, Armenia	T. t. amicorum E. Hartert, 1923	Breeds in central and eastern Turkey east through the Caucasus and Elburz Mountains to Turkmenistan; winters mainly in Iran and parts of Iraq	Blackest plumage with minimal pale fringing on the body feathers, but with very strong pale wing panel

Analysis of mitochondrial DNA samples from across Europe suggests that this species had a much broader distribution after the Last Glacial Period that ended about 11,700 years ago than it does now.

== Description ==
The ring ouzel is 23–24 centimetres (9.1–9.4 in) in length and weighs 90–138 grams (3.2–4.9 oz). The plumage of the male of the nominate race is entirely black except for a conspicuous white crescent on the breast, narrow greyish scaling on the upperparts and belly and pale edges to the wing feathers. The bill is yellow and the legs are greyish brown. The female resembles the male but is browner and with a duller breast band. Juveniles are like the female, but with a faint or non-existent breast crescent.

The pale breast marking makes adults of this species unmistakeable; first-winter males also sometimes show a pale crescent. Other young ouzels can be confused with the common blackbird, but always show a paler wing panel than that species.

Males of T. t. alpestris have broader white scalloping (repeated small curves) on their underparts than T. t. torquatus, giving a distinctly scaly appearance below. The wing panel is also paler than in the nominate subspecies. Females are much as the nominate race, but with broad white fringes on the chin and throat. Males of T. t. amicorum have the largest and whitest breast band of the three subspecies, and the broader white edges and tips of the wing feathers form a distinctive whitish panel in the wing. Females have narrow white fringes on their underparts. Adult ring ouzels undergo a complete moult after breeding from late June to early September, before their autumn migration. Juveniles have a partial moult between July and September, replacing their head, body and wing covert feathers.

=== Voice ===
The male ring ouzel sings from a low perch or occasionally in flight. The song consists of a repetition of 2–4 plaintive fluty notes, tri-ríí, tri-ríí, ti-ríí with pauses between repeats. The call is a loud tac-tac-tac, becoming harsher if the bird is alarmed. The contact call is a soft cherrr in flight. Males sing most frequently at dawn and sunset.

== Distribution and habitat ==
The ring ouzel breeds discontinuously across western and northern Europe from northwest Ireland through Scandinavia to northwest Russia, and in mountains across central southern Europe from the Pyrenees through the Alps, the Balkans, Greece and Turkey east to Turkmenistan. In 2014, breeding was recorded on the Timan Ridge, Arkhangelsk Oblast, about 300 kilometres (190 mi) further east than previously known breeding sites in north Russia.

The species is migratory, birds leaving the breeding areas in September and October. Birds of the nominate subspecies winter in southern Spain and northwest Africa. Central European populations of T. t. alpestris move to higher elevations initially before moving south or southwest through the Swiss Alps; some two weeks later migrants of the nominate subspecies pass through the same area to winter in the south of the breeding range or around the Mediterranean. Eastern T. t. alpestris ouzels migrate through the Balkans and Turkey. T. t. amicorum moves south to Egypt and neighbouring areas. The return migration is mainly in March and April, the males arriving some days before the females. Northern breeders arrive later, and in the mountains, some birds may ascend in stages as the snow melts. Many birds stop off at traditional well-grazed grassland locations with steep slopes in both spring and autumn.

The ring ouzel is extinct in Latvia and occurs only on migration in Denmark. It is a passage migrant in Syria and a vagrant to Iceland, Jordan, the Arabian Peninsula, Sudan, Kazakhstan, Mauritania, Svalbard and Jan Mayen. In the Atlantic, it is a regular winter visitor to the Canary Islands but a rarity in the Azores and Madeira.

In middle latitudes, the ring ouzel is a bird of continental mountains, but in the north of its range, it is found in coastal uplands. It can cope with wind and rain but avoids ice and snow. Nominate T. t. torquatus is usually found on open moorland with a few stunted trees above 250 metres (820 ft), and reaching 1,200 metres (3,900 ft) in Scotland and northern Europe. In Switzerland, ring ouzels breed on rugged upland slopes with heather, conifers, beech or hairy alpenrose at 1,100–1,300 metres (3,600–4,300 ft), although in Turkey birds are found from near sea level to 1,500 metres (4,900 ft). In Armenia and the Caucasus, it occupies similar steep habitat with conifer stands, rhododendron thickets, and juniper scrub and shrub, from sea level to 2,000–3,000 metres (6,600–9,800 ft).

In northwest Africa ring ouzels winter in juniper forest at 1,800–2,200 metres (5,900–7,200 ft), often near rivers or ponds. On migration, ouzels may occur on coastal grassland and steep hillsides with short, unsown wild grass and sparse scrub.

== Behaviour ==
The ring ouzel is territorial and normally seen alone or in pairs, although loose flocks may form on migration. When not breeding, several birds may be loosely associated in good feeding areas, such as a fruiting tree, often with other thrushes such as song thrushes or redwings. The ouzel's flight is direct, and birds often perch on rocks or heather clumps.

=== Breeding ===
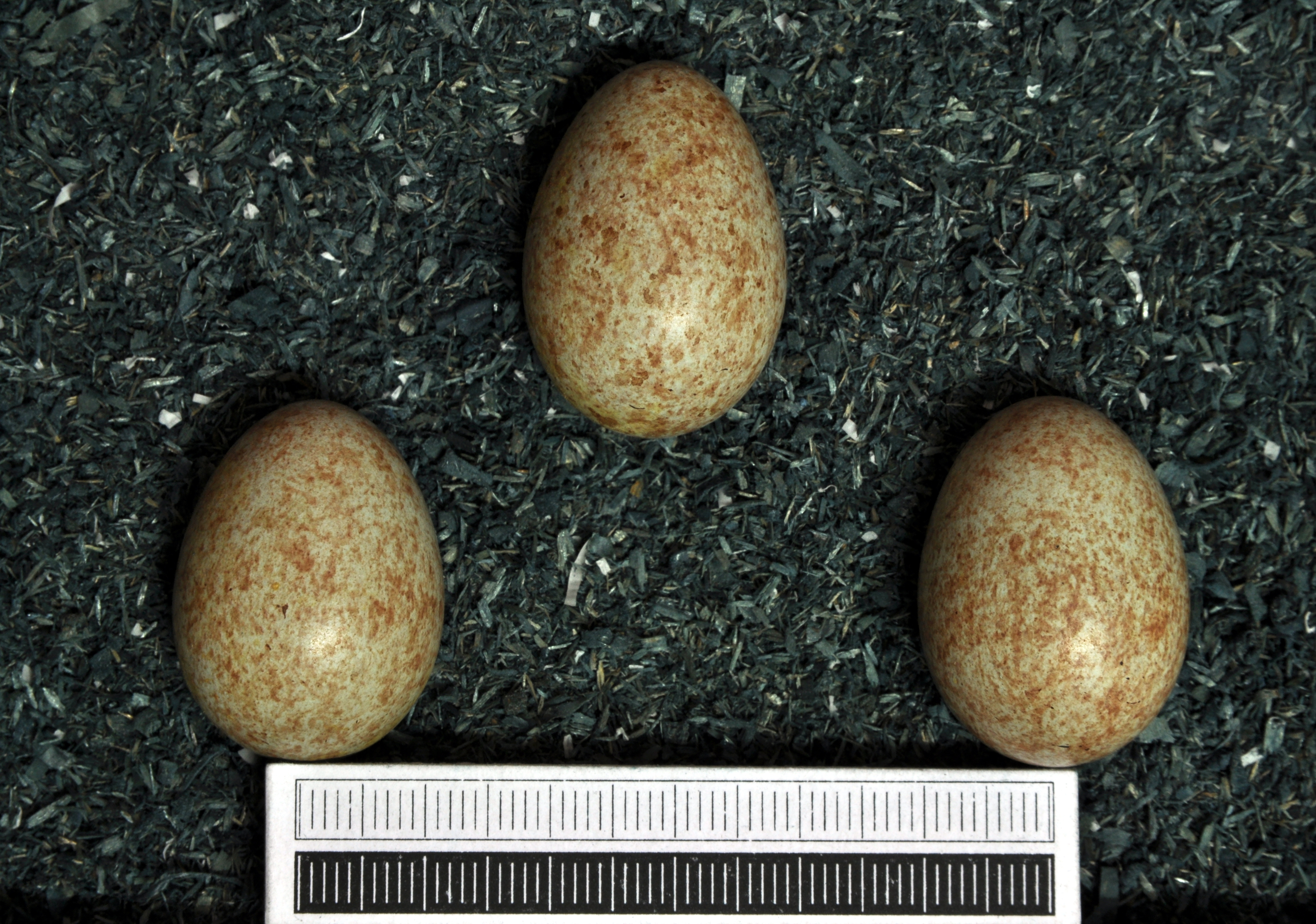
Eggs in collection of Museum Wiesbaden

Ring ouzels nest from mid-April to mid-July in the Alps and the British Isles, and from May to August in Scandinavia. Territories may be strung out along streams, 160–200 metres (520–660 ft) apart and the ranges may overlap, but this species does not form breeding colonies. The nest, built by the female, is a cup of leaves, dry grass and other plant material consolidated with mud. In the west of the range nests are almost always built on the ground, but T. t. alpestris may also nest in a small tree or scrub at an average height of 3.5 metres (11 ft).

The clutch is 3–6 pale blue or greenish-blue eggs flecked with reddish-brown. The eggs are 30 mm × 22 mm (1.18 in × 0.87 in) in size and weigh 7.4 grams (0.26 oz) of which 6% is shell. Incubation is almost always by the female, hatching typically occurring after 13 days. The altricial, downy chicks fledge in another 14 days. The young are dependent on their parents for about 12 days after fledging.

Adults breed after their first year and their average lifespan is two years, although nine years has been recorded. There may be two broods, especially in the south of the range, although triple-brooding is rare. This species is philopatric, returning to the same area to breed each year. Around 36% of juveniles survive their first year, while the annual survival rate for adults is 47% for males and 37% for females. The main causes of death in northwest Europe are predation (9%), accidental human-related incidents (10%), and hunting, mainly in France (77%).

=== Diet ===
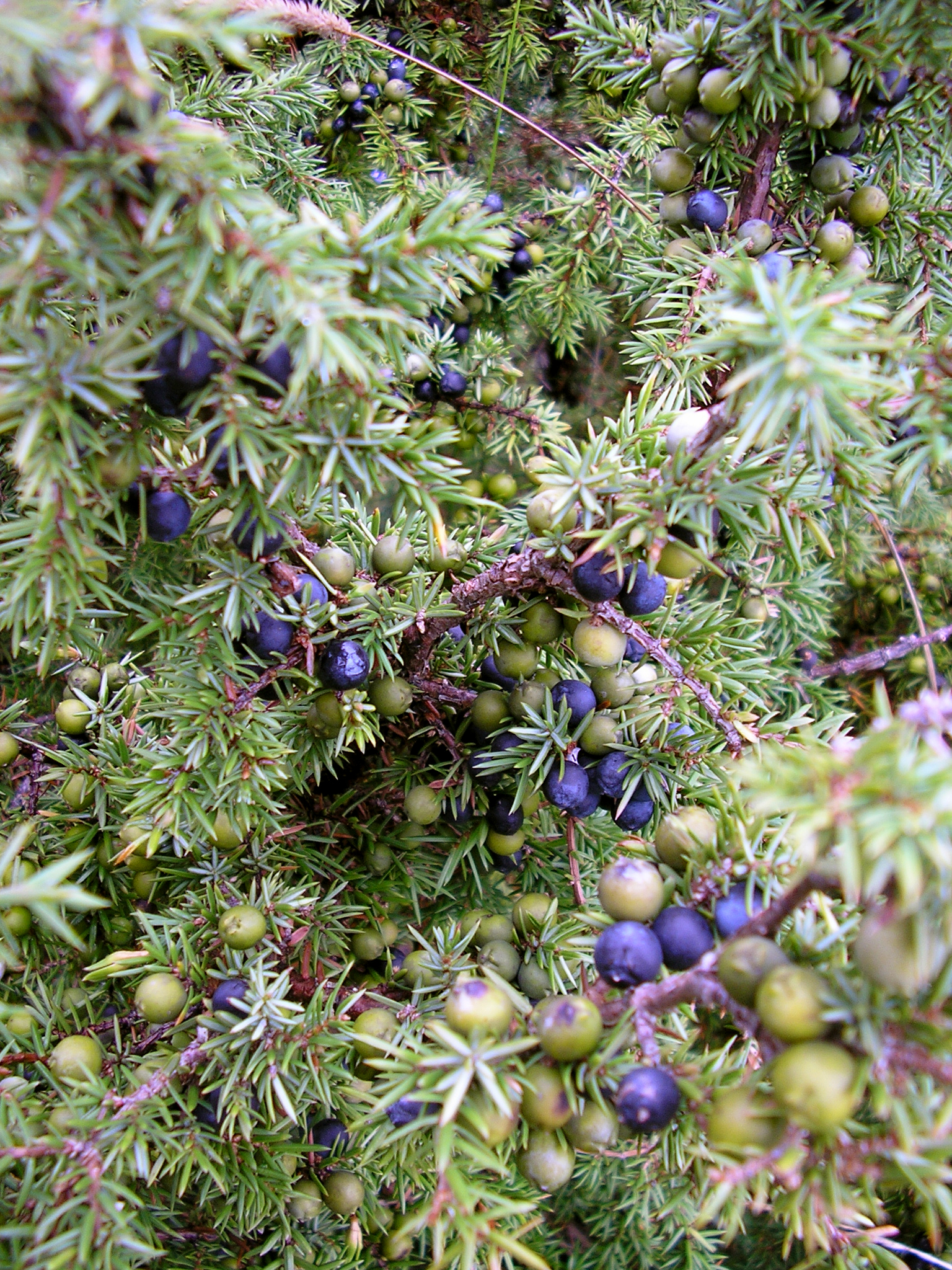
Juniper cones ("berries") are a favoured winter food item.

The ring ouzel is omnivorous, eating a wide range of insects, earthworms, small amphibians and reptiles and fruit. Most animal prey is caught on the ground.

During spring migration and the breeding season, invertebrates dominate the diet, and include earthworms, beetles flies, ants, spiders and snails. Later in the year, fruit becomes more important, including bramble, strawberry, cherry, hawthorn, rowan and juniper. Where it is available common juniper makes up more than 90% of the ring ouzel's winter diet, with arthropods constituting most of the rest. As a result, the ring ouzel is an important vector for dispersing juniper seeds, and is key to the dispersal of the endemic Canary Islands juniper in the Canary Islands.

The young are mainly fed invertebrates, caterpillars and earthworms being major items where available. Although birds migrating in autumn use similar habitat to that used in spring, seasonal berries make up most of their diet, particularly elder berries, haws and, where available, juniper berries.

== Predators and parasites ==
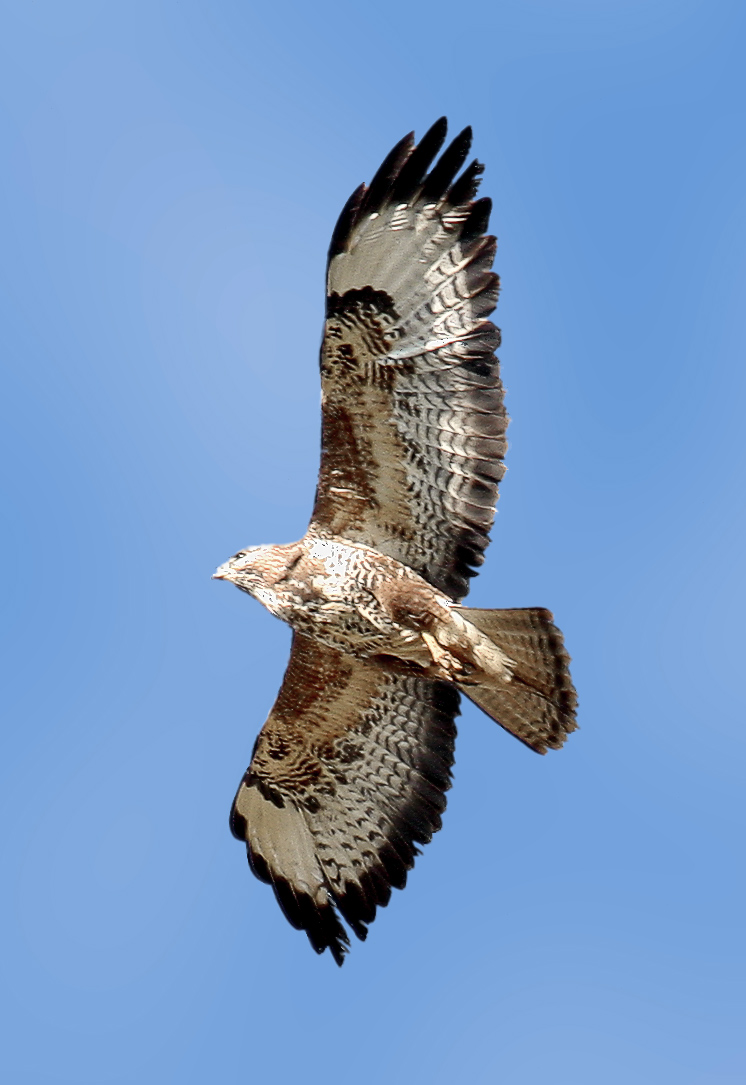
The common buzzard is a predator of ring ouzels.

Predators of the ring ouzel include the tawny owl, long-eared owl, common buzzard, common kestrel, Eurasian sparrowhawk, weasel, and stoat. Most deaths are of young juveniles; birds hatched early in the season are more likely to survive than later broods. A Scottish study showed that raptors were responsible for 59% of deaths and mammals for 27%. In Romania, eggs were taken by red squirrels and spotted nutcrackers. As with other Turdus thrushes, the ring ouzel is rarely a host of the common cuckoo, a brood parasite. If the thrush's nest cup is too deep for the cuckoo to evict the host's chicks, the young cuckoo cannot successfully compete for food with the fast-growing host species' chicks, and if the cuckoo does manage to expel its nest-mates, the parents are reluctant to feed it; either way, the young cuckoo will starve.

A study in the Carpathian Mountains found that a significant proportion of ring ouzels carried trombiculid mites. These mites commonly infect ground-feeding birds, and heavy infestations can cause birds to lose condition and stop feeding. The hard-bodied tick Ixodes festai commonly parasitises thrushes, including the ring ouzel. There is a record of this species carrying a Haemoproteus blood parasite.

== Status and conservation ==
The ring ouzel has an extensive range, estimated at 9.17 million square kilometres (3.54 million sq mi), and a large population, estimated at 600,000–2 million individuals in Europe (which comprises 95% of the breeding range). The species is not believed to approach the thresholds for the population decline criteria of the IUCN Red List (i.e., declining more than 30% in ten years or three generations), and is therefore evaluated as least concern. The breeding population in Europe was estimated to be 299,000–598,000 pairs in 2019.

There are signs of decline in several countries. Its decline in Ireland in recent years has been striking, with regular breeding now confined to one county, Donegal, with only four to nine breeding pairs left in 2021. Suspected causes include climate change, human disturbance, hunting and outdoor leisure activities. Loss of junipers may be a factor in southern Spain and north-west Africa, as may upland forestation in the UK. There may also be competition from larger thrushes like the common blackbird, mistle thrush and fieldfare. A Scottish study suggested that sites at higher altitudes and with a good cover of heather were less likely to have been deserted by breeding ring ouzels than lower or more open locations.

In the Alps, the density of breeding pairs can reach 60–80 per square kilometre (160–210/sq mi) but is generally much lower with 37 per square kilometre (96/sq mi) in Haute-Savoie, 22 per square kilometre (57/sq mi) in the Jura Mountains, and 8 per square kilometre (21/sq mi) in more open habitats in Britain.

== Cited texts ==
- Clement, Peter; Hathway, Ren; Wilczur, Jan (2000). Thrushes. Helm Identification Guides. London: Christopher Helm. ISBN 0-7136-3940-7.
- Lockwood, W B (1984). Oxford Book of British Bird Names. Oxford: Oxford University Press. ISBN 0-19-214155-4.
