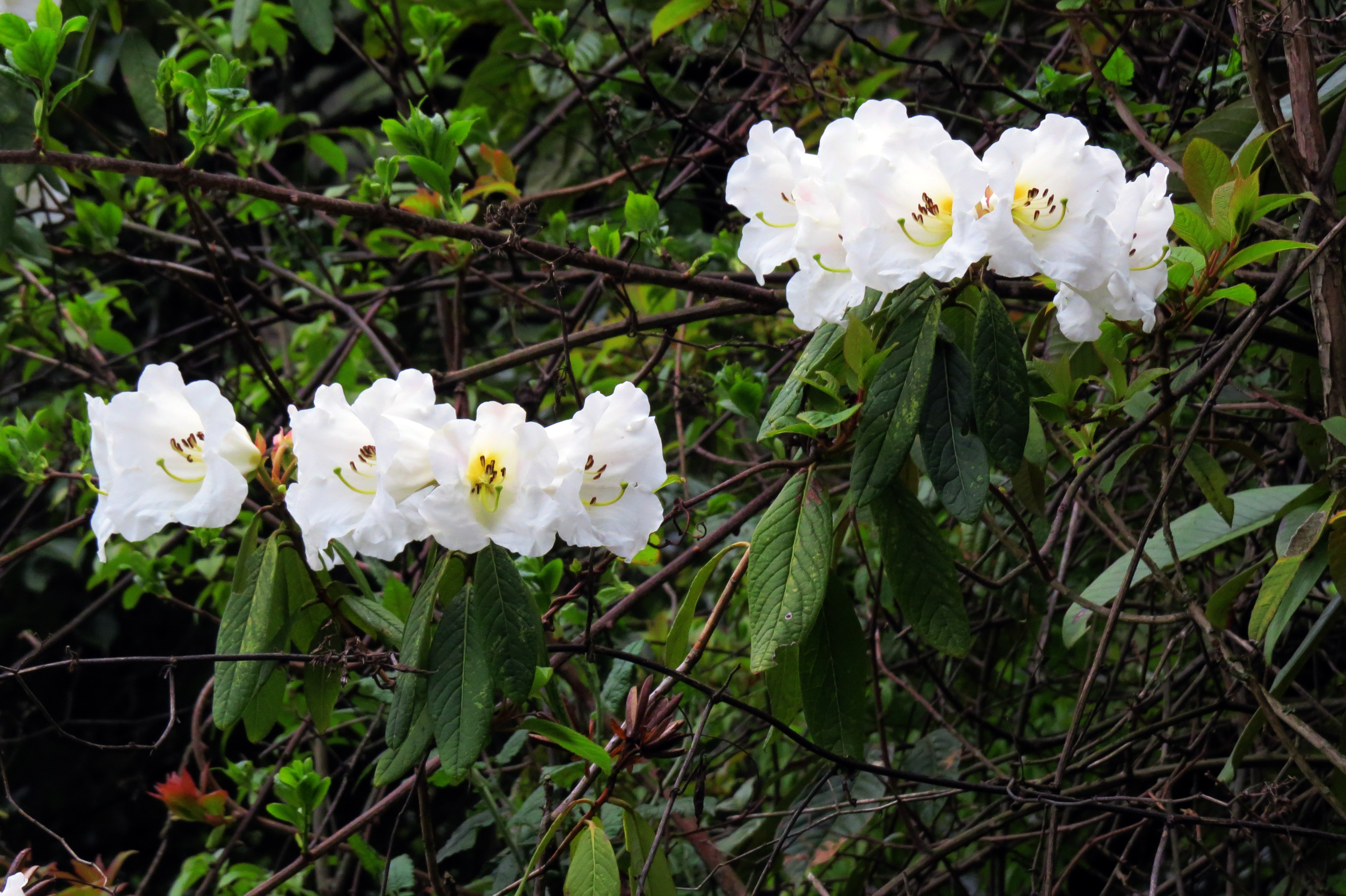
- Rhododendron edgeworthii

Scientific classification
- Kingdom: Plantae
- Clade: Tracheophytes
- Clade: Angiosperms
- Clade: Eudicots
- Clade: Asterids
- Order: Ericales
- Family: Ericaceae
- Genus: Rhododendron
- Subgenus: Rhododendron subg. Rhododendron
- Section: Rhododendron sect. Rhododendron
- Subsection: Rhododendron subsect. Edgeworthia (Hutch.) Sleumer

Type species
- Rhododendron edgeworthii

Species
- See text

= Rhododendron subsect. Edgeworthia =

Section of rhododendrons

Rhododendron subsect. Edgeworthia is a subsection of section Rhododendron in Rhododendron in the genus Rhododendron. It comprises 3 species of shrubs native to East Asia.

== Species ==
Image	Name	Distribution
	Rhododendron edgeworthii Hook.f. 1851	China (Sichuan, Xizang, Yunnan), Bhutan, India, Myanmar, Sikkim
	Rhododendron pendulum Hook.f. 1851	China (Xizang), Bhutan, Nepal, Sikkim
	Rhododendron seinghkuense Kingdon-Ward 1930	China (Xizang, Yunnan), Myanmar
