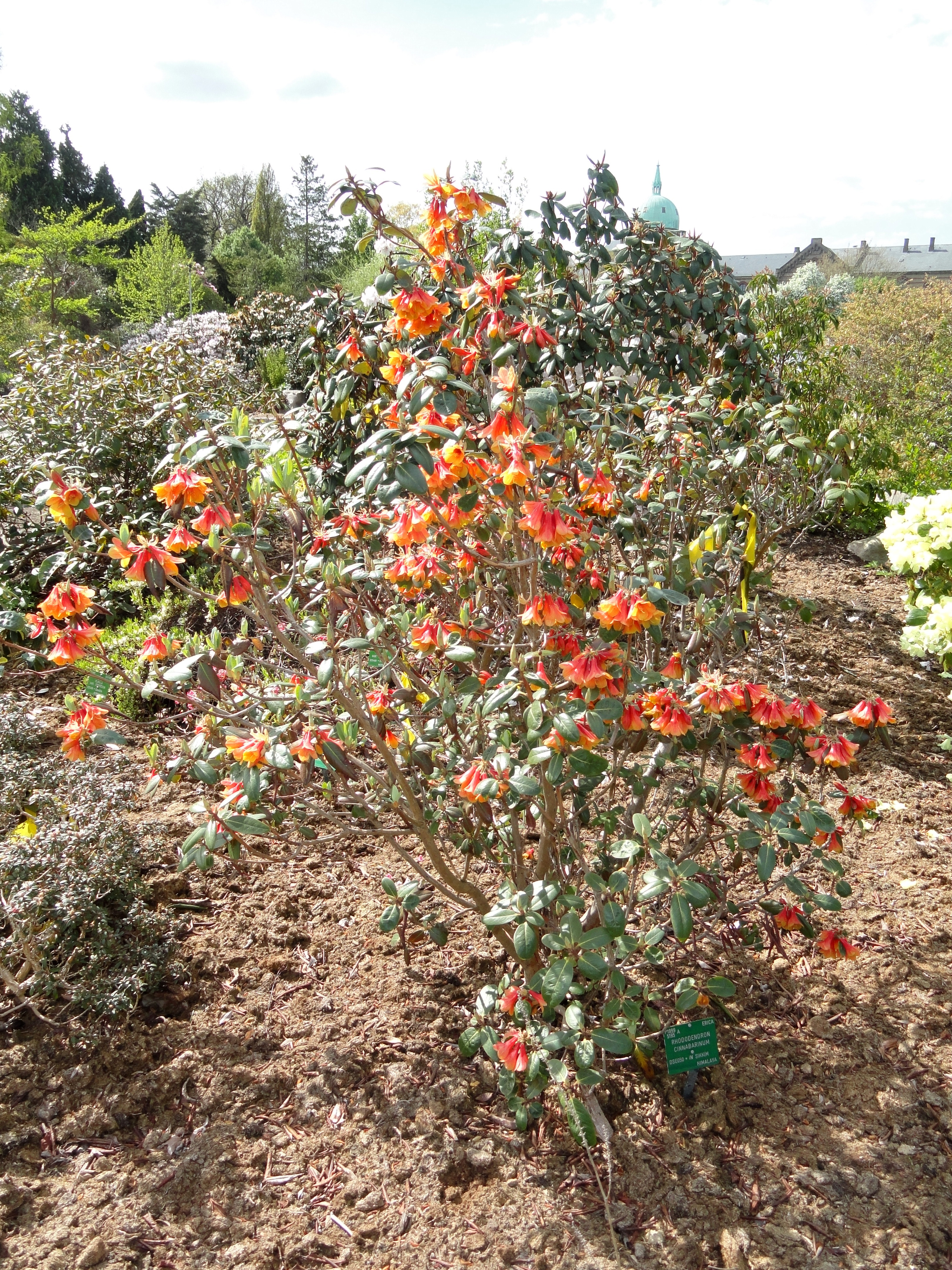
- Rhododendron cinnabarinum

Scientific classification
- Kingdom: Plantae
- Clade: Tracheophytes
- Clade: Angiosperms
- Clade: Eudicots
- Clade: Asterids
- Order: Ericales
- Family: Ericaceae
- Genus: Rhododendron
- Subgenus: Rhododendron subg. Rhododendron
- Section: Rhododendron sect. Rhododendron
- Subsection: Rhododendron subsect. Cinnabarinum (Hutch.) Sleumer

Type species
- Rhododendron cinnabarinum

Species
- See text

= Rhododendron subsect. Cinnabarinum =

Section of rhododendrons

Rhododendron subsect. Cinnabarinum is a subsection of section Rhododendron in Rhododendron in the genus Rhododendron. It comprises 5 species of evergreen shrubs native to East Asia.

== Species ==
| Image | Name | Distribution |
|---|---|---|
| | Rhododendron cinnabarinum Hook.f. 1849 | India, Nepal, Bhutan, Sikkim, China ( Xizang, Yunnan) |
| | Rhododendron igneum Cowan 1937 | China ( Xizang ) |
| | Rhododendron keysii Nutt. | India, Bhutan, Sikkim, China ( Xizang ) |
| | Rhododendron lateriflorum R.C.Fang & A.L.Chang 1983 | China (Yunnan) |
| | Rhododendron tenuifolium R.C.Fang & S.H.Huang 1986 | China ( Xizang ) |
