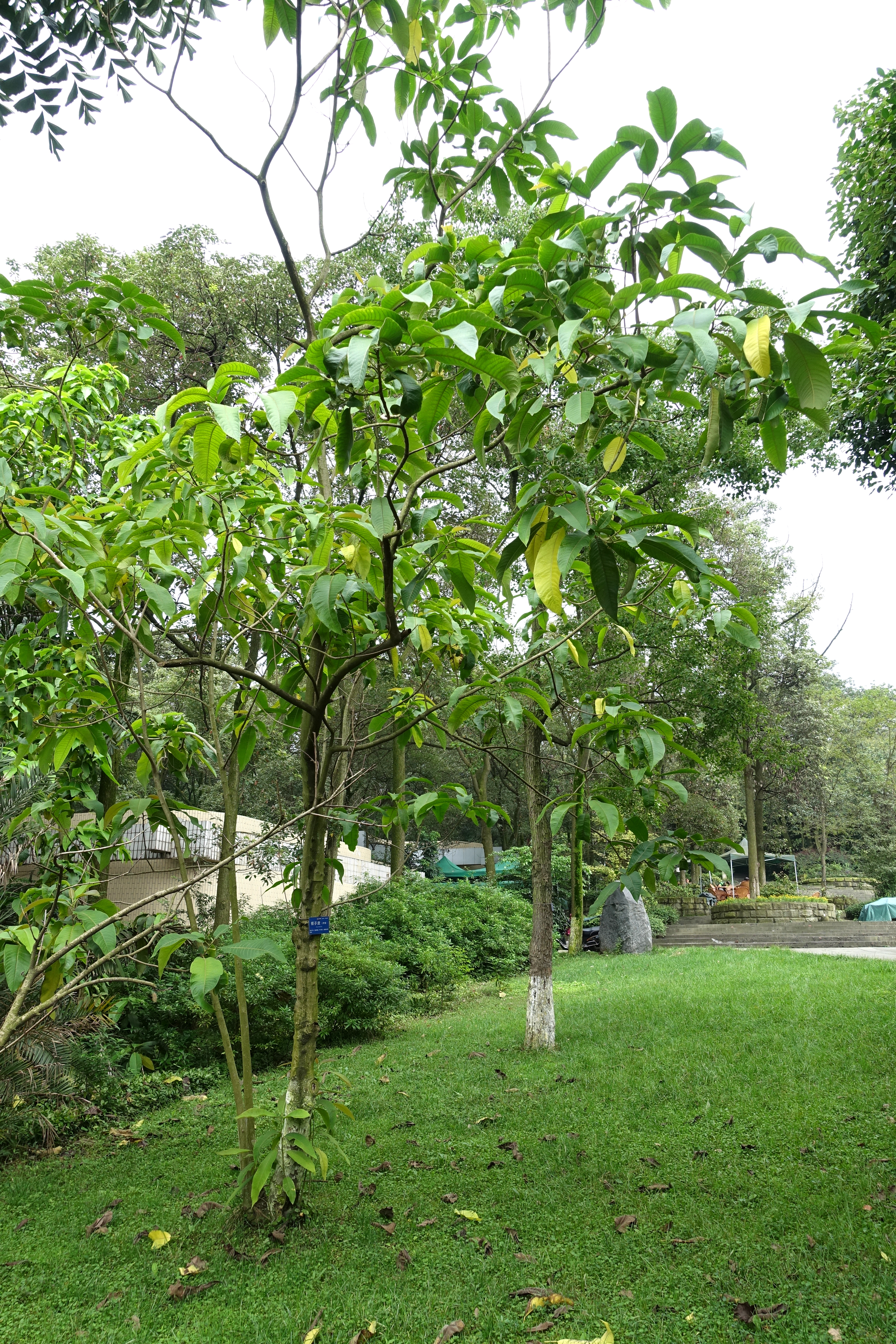
- Itoa orientalis in Chengdu Botanical Garden, China

Conservation status
- Least Concern (IUCN 3.1)

Scientific classification
- Kingdom: Plantae
- Clade: Tracheophytes
- Clade: Angiosperms
- Clade: Eudicots
- Clade: Rosids
- Order: Malpighiales
- Family: Salicaceae
- Genus: Itoa
- Species: I. orientalis

Binomial name
- Itoa orientalis Hemsl.

Synonyms
- Itoa orientalis var. glabrescens C.Y.Wu ex G.S.Fan

= Itoa orientalis =

Species of flowering plants

Itoa orientalis is a species of flowering plant belonging to the family Salicaceae. It is an evergreen tree from China and Vietnam, and cultivated as an ornamental tree.

== Description ==
A tree that grows up to 13 m (43 ft) high. It has branchlets (small branches) that are covered with yellowish hairs when young and later become glabrous and lenticellate (having lens-like areas on the surface). The leaves are evergreen, 9–42 cm (4–17 in) long and 5–18 cm (2–7 in) wide. They are elliptic to obovate or broad-lanceolate in shape. With the upper surface of the leaf, largely glabrous and the lower surface with stiff hairs, particularly on the veins. The leaves have 10–26 secondary veins on each side of the midrib, with margins almost entire to regularly crenate or serrate and an apex that is acute or emarginate. The petiole (stalk of the leaf) is 1.5–6 cm (1–2 in) long and pubescent. It begins blossoming between May and June, with clusters of curious yellow buff flowers. The staminate (male flower, flower with stamens but no pistil) inflorescences are paniculate (male flower, flower with stamens but no pistil), about 5 cm long with about 12 flowers. The axes (stems) are pubescent (covered with short, soft hairs). The staminate flowers are ribbed and densely tomentose (covered in matted hairs) in bud. The pistillate flowers are small and solitary. It begins fruiting (making a seed capsule) between September and October. The seed capsule is pale yellow, ovoid in shape, tomentose, 8–9 cm (3–4 in) long and 4–6 cm (2–2 in) wide with a 6-8-lobed stigma at the tip. The fruiting peduncle (flower stalk) is robust. The seeds are small, with a wing up to 2 cm wide.

== Taxonomy ==
The genus name of Itoa is in honour of Keisuke Itō (1803–1901) a Japanese physician and biologist, and his grandson Tokutarō Itō (1868–1941), and the Latin specific epithet of orientalis means coming from the Orient or the east. It was first described and published in Hooker's Icon. Pl. Vol.27 on table 2688 in 1901.

== Range and habitat ==
It is found in broadleaf evergreen forests, in south-eastern China, (including Hainan island and provinces of Guizhou, Sichuan and Yunnan) and Vietnam, at altitudes between 600 and 1,300 m (2,000 and 4,300 ft) above sea level.

== Uses ==
It is grown as an ornamental tree in Australia, Cornwall, UK, and Ireland.
