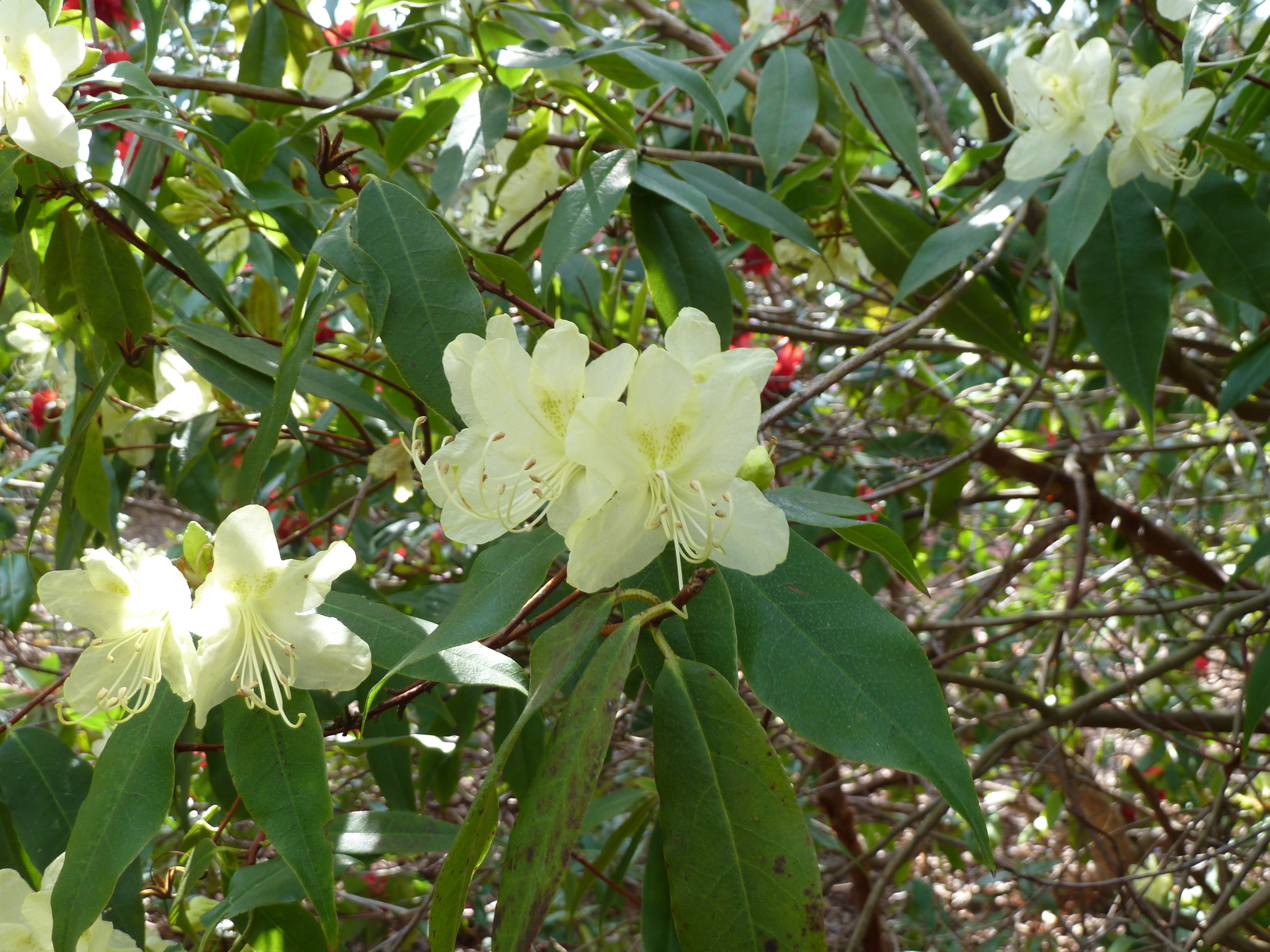

Scientific classification
- Kingdom: Plantae
- Clade: Tracheophytes
- Clade: Angiosperms
- Clade: Eudicots
- Clade: Asterids
- Order: Ericales
- Family: Ericaceae
- Genus: Rhododendron
- Subgenus: Rhododendron subg. Rhododendron
- Section: Rhododendron sect. Rhododendron
- Species: R. lutescens

Binomial name
- Rhododendron lutescens Franch.

Synonyms
- Rhododendron blinii H. Lév.; Rhododendron costulatum Franch.; Rhododendron lemeei H. Lév.

= Rhododendron lutescens =

Species of plant

Rhododendron lutescens is a rhododendron species native to Guizhou, Sichuan, and Yunnan, China, where it grows at altitudes of 1,700–2,000 m (5,600–6,600 ft). It is a shrub that grows to 1–3 m (3–10 ft) in height, with leaves that are lanceolate, oblong-lanceolate or ovate-lanceolate, 4–9 cm (1.6–3.5 in) long by 1.5–2.5 cm (0.6–1.0 in) wide. Its flowers are yellow. It is placed in section Rhododendron.
