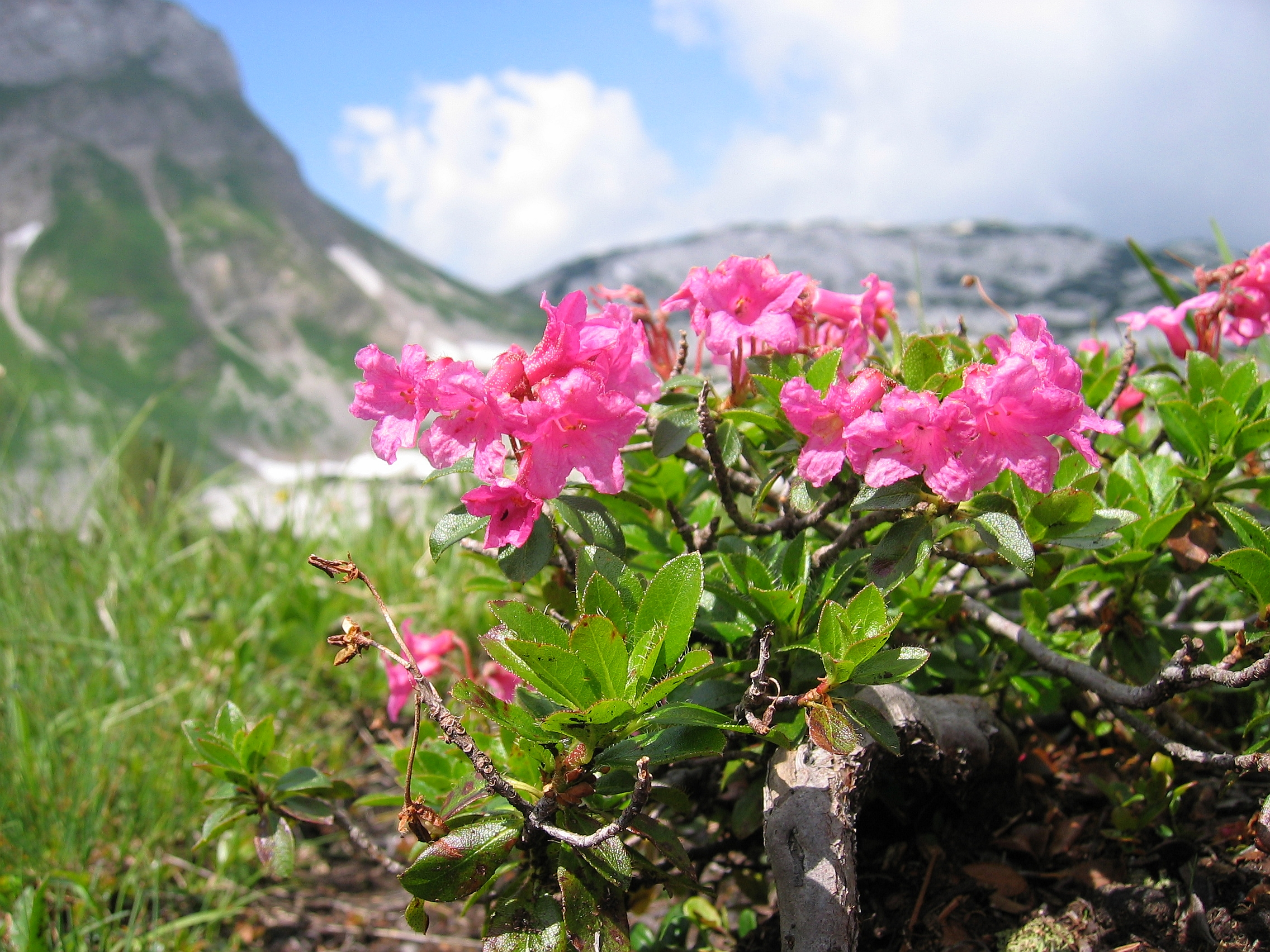

Conservation status
- Least Concern (IUCN 3.1)

Scientific classification
- Kingdom: Plantae
- Clade: Tracheophytes
- Clade: Angiosperms
- Clade: Eudicots
- Clade: Asterids
- Order: Ericales
- Family: Ericaceae
- Genus: Rhododendron
- Subgenus: Rhododendron subg. Rhododendron
- Species: R. hirsutum

Binomial name
- Rhododendron hirsutum L.

= Rhododendron hirsutum =

Species of flowering plant native to Europe

Rhododendron hirsutum, commonly known as the hairy alpenrose is one of the species of Rhododendron native to the mountains of Europe. It occurs widely in the Alps except for the southwestern region (approximately south and west of the Matterhorn), and has become naturalised in parts of the Carpathians. It grows on carbonate-rich soils, whereas its close relative R. ferrugineum grows on acid soils; where the two occur together, they frequently produce the hybrid Rhododendron × intermedium.
