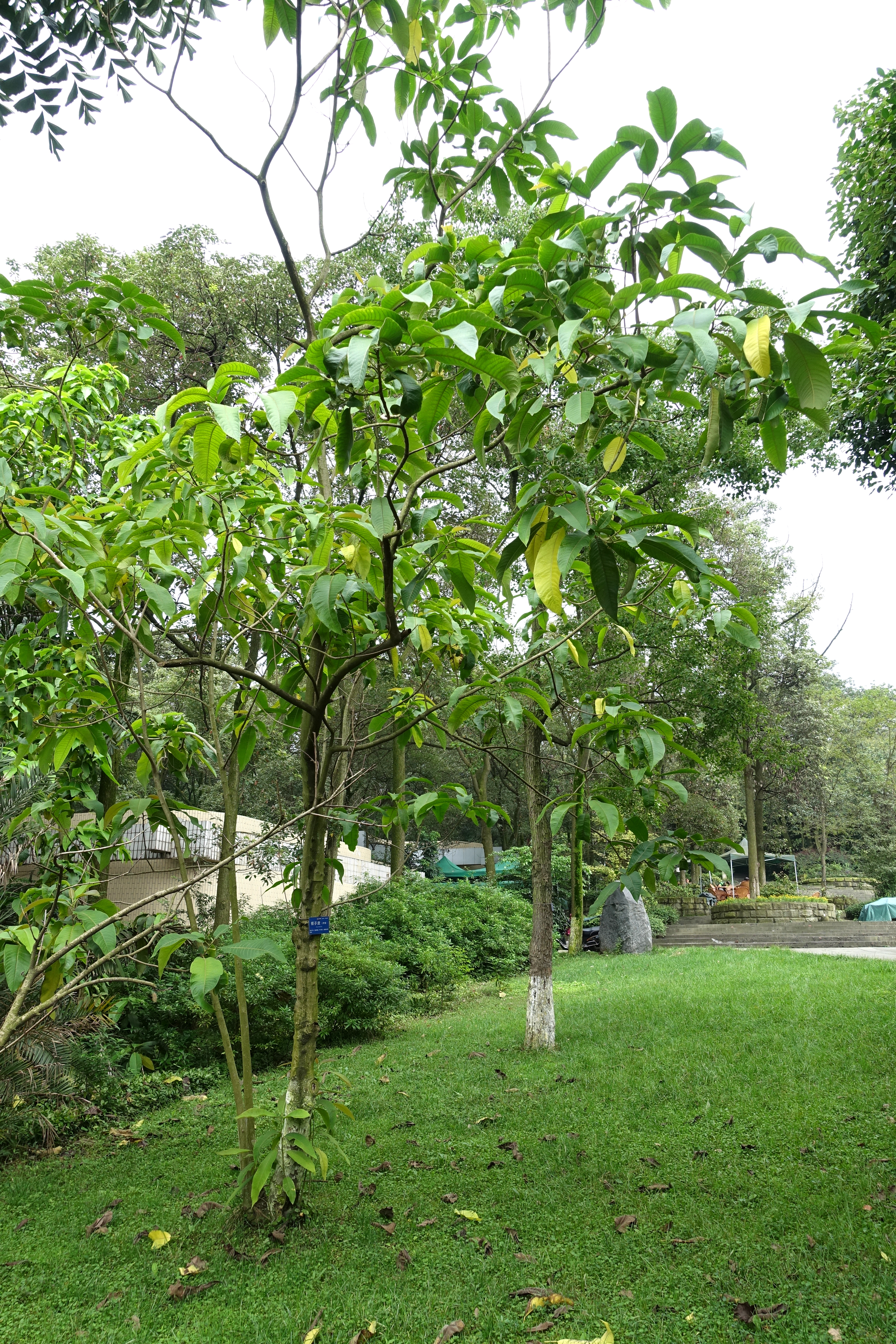
- Itoa orientalis in Chengdu Botanical Garden, China

Scientific classification
- Kingdom: Plantae
- Clade: Embryophytes
- Clade: Tracheophytes
- Clade: Spermatophytes
- Clade: Angiosperms
- Clade: Eudicots
- Clade: Rosids
- Order: Malpighiales
- Family: Salicaceae
- Subfamily: Salicoideae
- Tribe: Saliceae
- Genus: Itoa; Hemsl.

Synonyms
- Mesaulosperma Slooten

= Itoa =

Genus of flowering plants

Itoa is a genus of flowering plants in the family Salicaceae and the tribe Saliceae.

Its native range is southern China to Vietnam, central and eastern Malesia to New Guinea. It is found in China (Hainan), Maluku Islands, New Guinea, Sulawesi and Vietnam.

== Description ==
An evergreen tree with broad leaves, that are alternate, sometimes sub-opposite placed. The leaf blade is pinnate-veined with lateral veins closely set, mostly 1-2 cm apart. The yellow buff flowers, are unisexual, hypogynous (borne below the ovary), The staminate flowers (male flower, flower with stamens but no pistil) are in erect, terminal panicles. The pistillate flowers (a flower containing one or more pistils but no stamens, female flower) has 1 to few in short terminal or axillary racemes. It has bracts and the bracteoles (small bracts) are a pair per pedicel, usually caducous (falling off early). The sepals appearing 3 or 4-merous in bud, in fact to 5-merous at anthesis (at time of flowering), nearly free, valvate, ovate shaped, with base appearing to be cordate (heart-shaped). The staminate flowers have many stamens with filaments free and filiform (thread-like). The anthers are ellipsoid to oblong in shape, basifixed, connective usually curved, bringing both locules (chambers) to face in same direction (towards the periphery of flower). The pistillate flowers have ovary superior, 1-loculed; placentas are 6-8, rarely 5, filiform and have a woody-like end. The ovules are numerous with 6-8 styles, which are very short, connate (cone-like), forming a short longitudinally ribbed column. The stigmatic branches (4-) 6-8 are spreading or strongly reflexed against the ovary and irregularly palmately lobed. The many staminodes (sterile stamen) are extragynoecial, like the stamens but very much reduced. The seed capsule is ovoid or ellipsoid in shape, large, woody, tomentose (covered in hairs), outer layer probably finally dehiscent. The valves (5 or) 6-8, are fusiform (rod shaped), splitting from apex and base and remaining attached by woody persistent placental strips. The styles are caducous. It has many seeds, which are arranged vertically in the capsule, they are winged with a broad wing, which is flat, thin, triangular, squarish or rectangular, completely surrounding seed.

== Taxonomy ==
The genus name of Itoa is in honour of Keisuke Itō (1803–1901) a Japanese physician and biologist, and his grandson Tokutarō Itō (1868–1941), and it was first described and published in Hooker's Icon. Pl. Vol.27 on table 2688 in 1901.

== Species ==
The following species are accepted by Plants of the World Online as of July 2026:

- Itoa orientalis Hemsl. – China South-Central, China Southeast, Hainan, Vietnam
- Itoa stapfii (Koord.) Sleumer – Sulawesi, Maluku, New Guinea
