= Keisuke Ito (botanist) =

Japanese physician and biologist

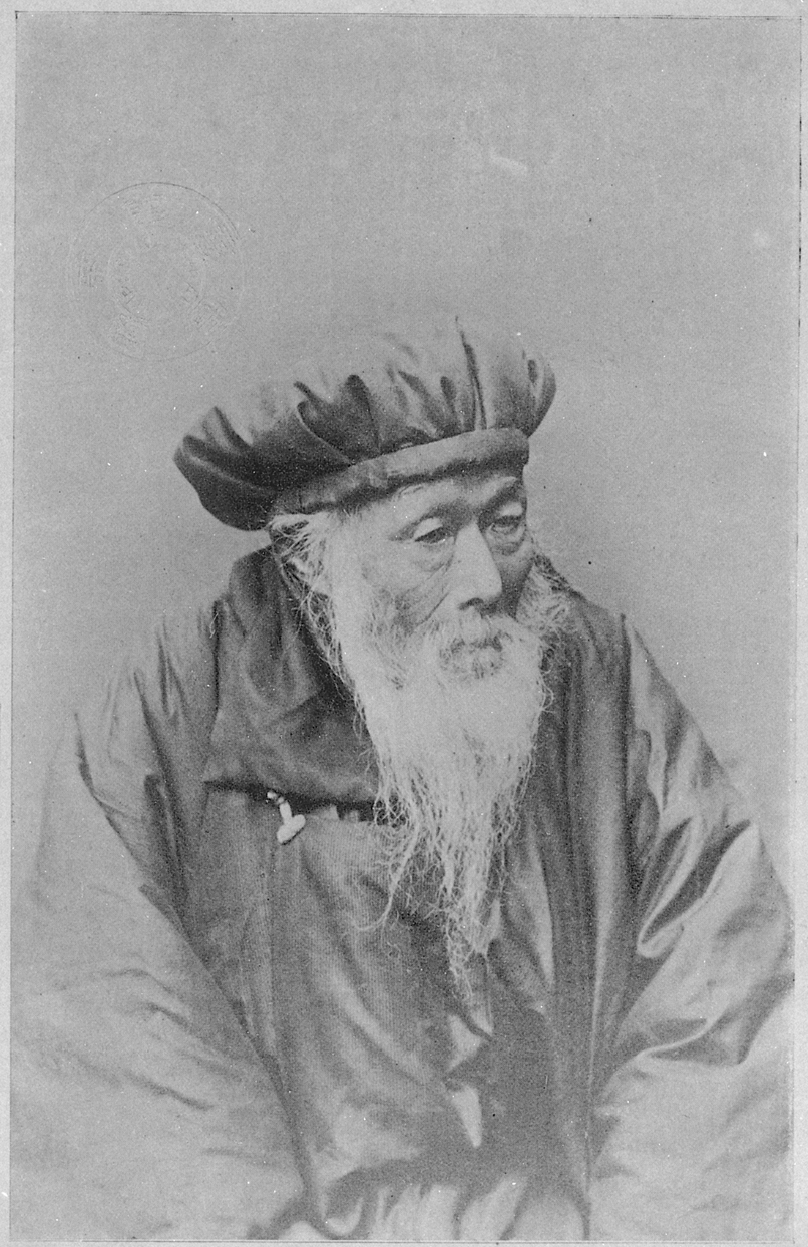
Keisuke Ito

Keisuke Ito (伊藤 圭介, Itō Keisuke; February 18, 1803 – January 20, 1901) was a Japanese physician and biologist. He was born in Nagoya.

As a doctor, Ito developed a vaccination against smallpox. He also widely studied the Japanese flora and fauna with Philipp Franz von Siebold, the author of Fauna Japonica and Flora Japonica. Rhododendron keiskei was named after him.

He wrote a translation of Flora Japonica titled Taisei honzou meiso (Japanese:"泰西本草名疏") that was published in 1829.

Ito became a professor at the University of Tokyo in 1881.

He died in 1901, and he was ennobled with the title of baron (danshaku).

In 1901, botanist William Botting Hemsley named a genus of flowering plants in the willow family, Salicaceae, from China and Vietnam, Itoa in his honour.

== Images ==
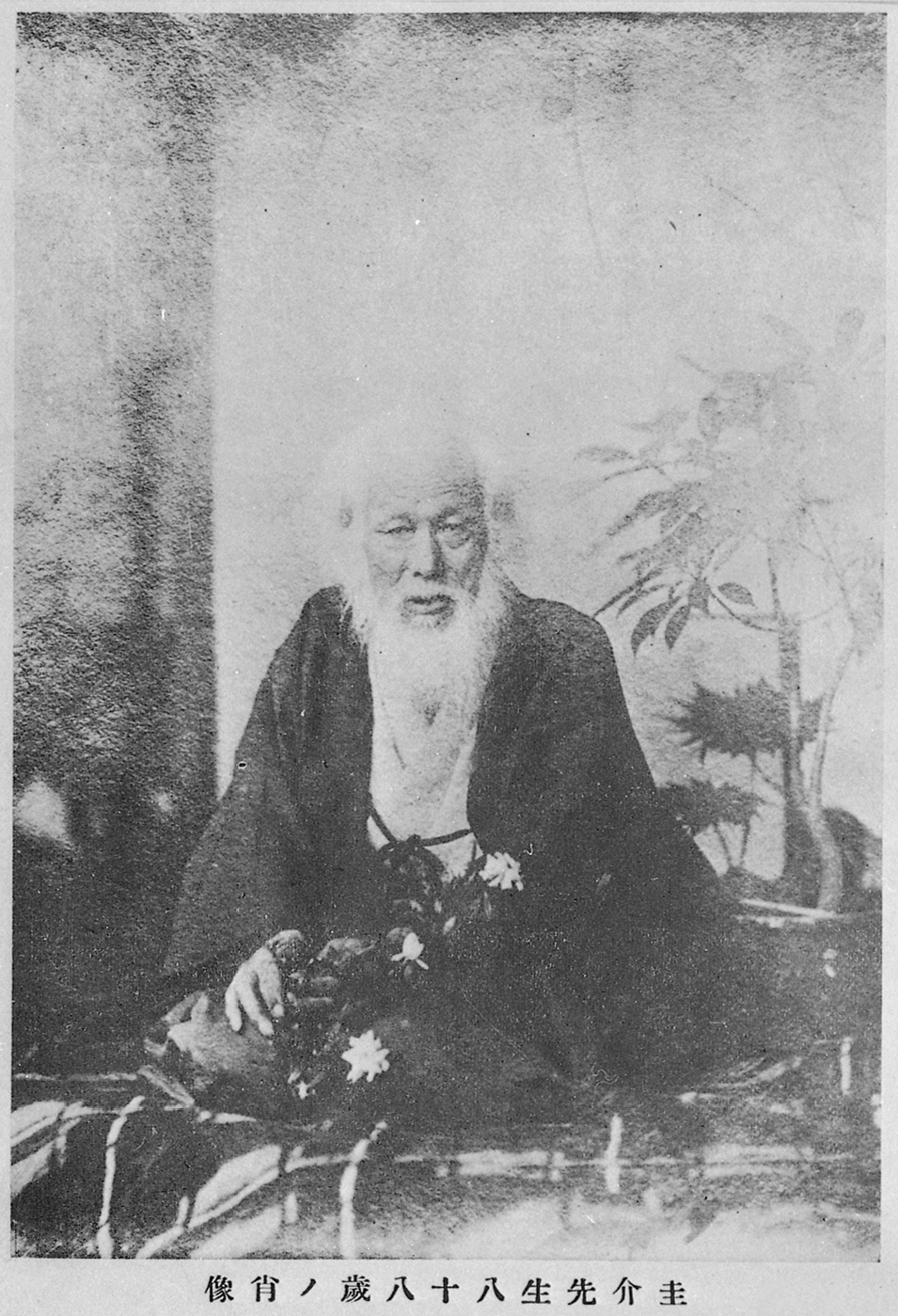
Keisuke Ito

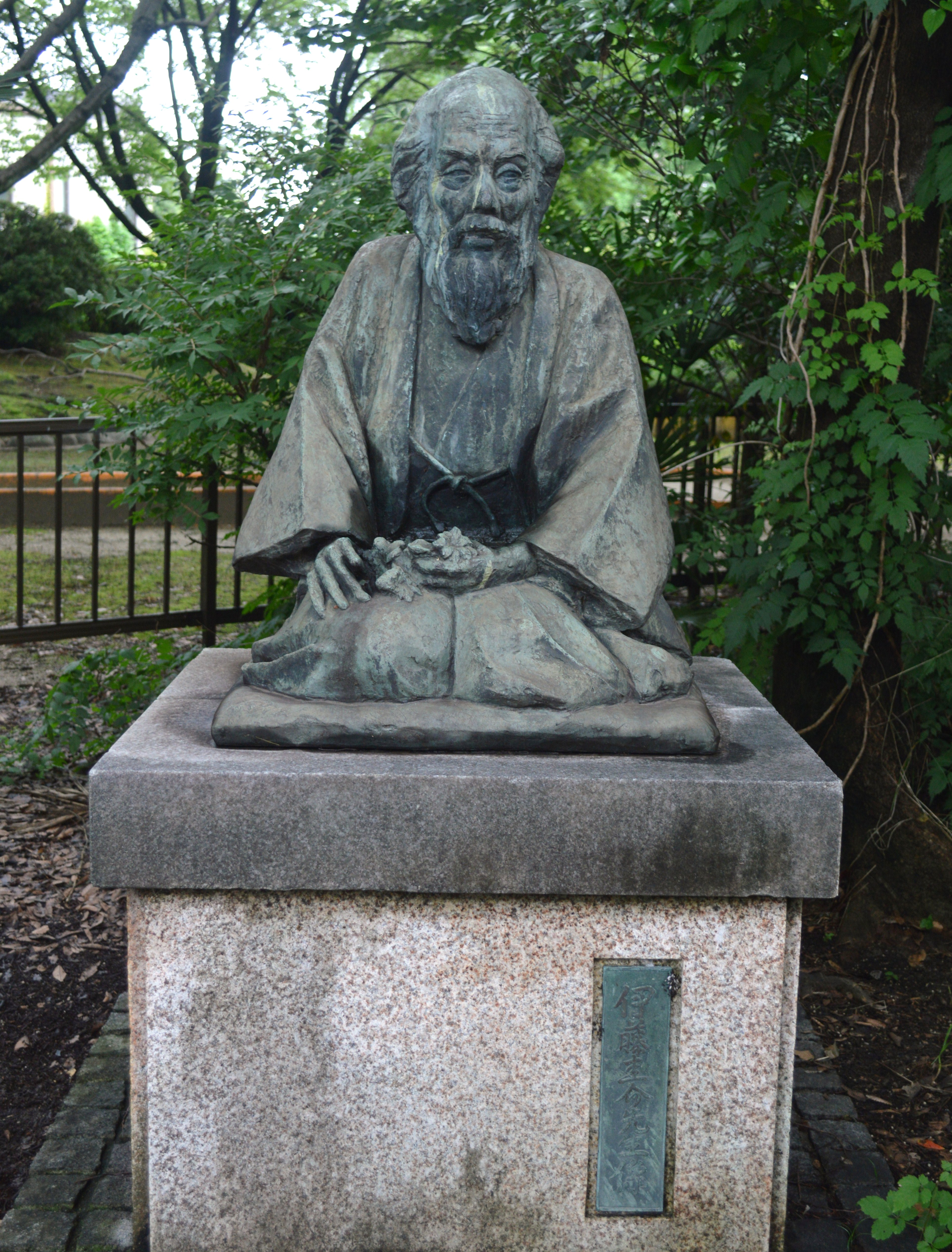
A statue of Ito keisuke

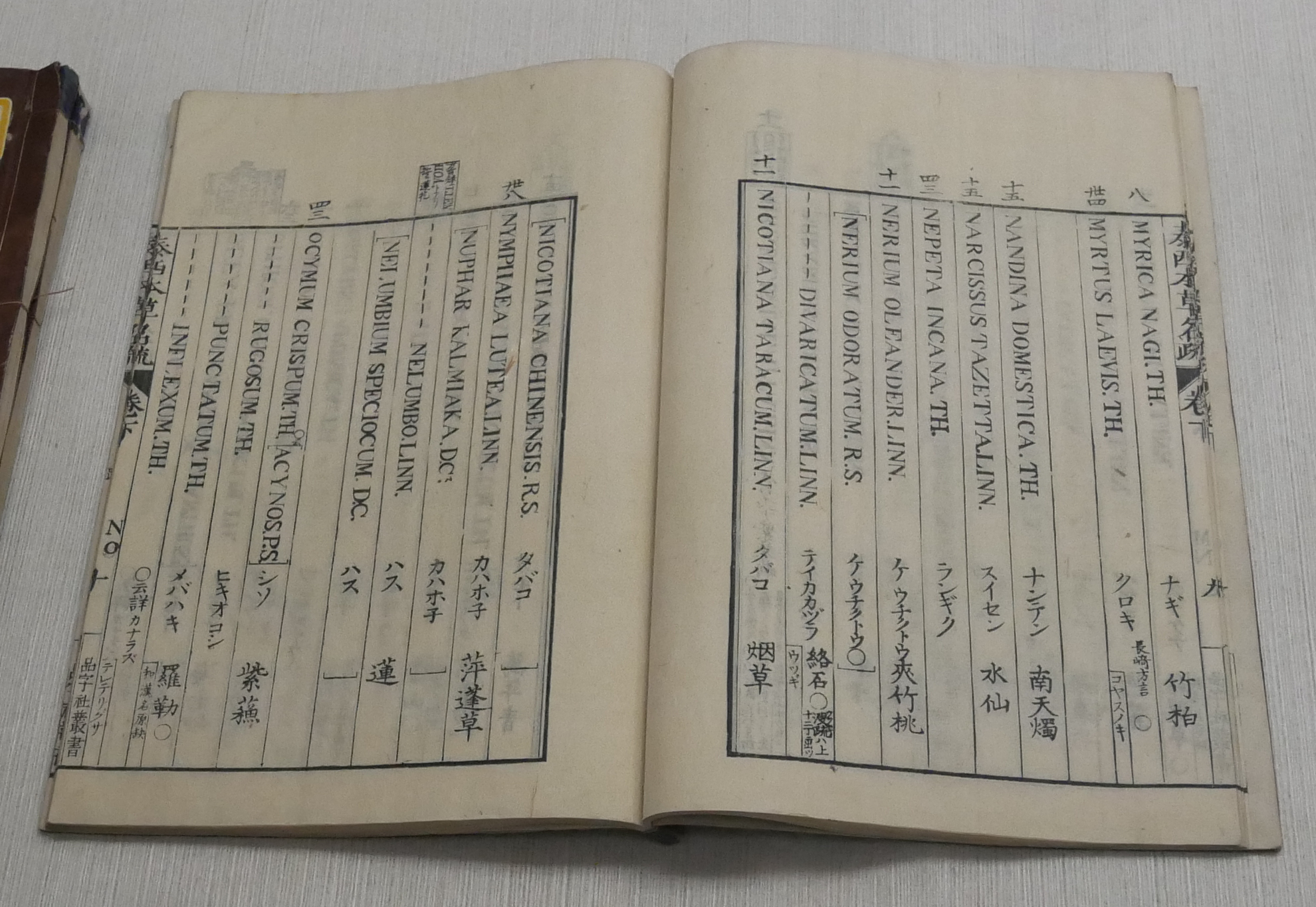
His translation of Flora Japonica
