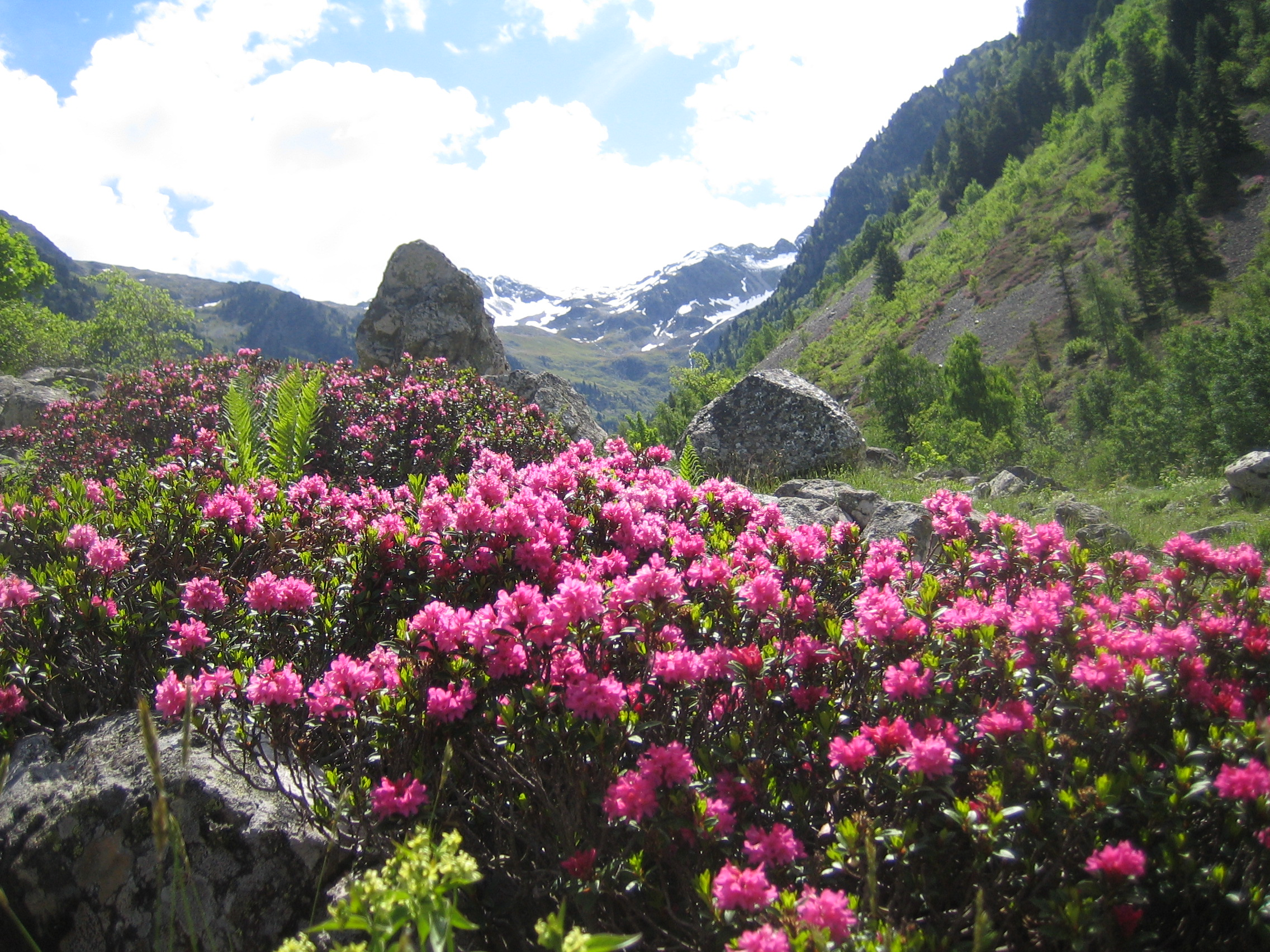
- Rhododendron ferrugineum

Scientific classification
- Kingdom: Plantae
- Clade: Embryophytes
- Clade: Tracheophytes
- Clade: Spermatophytes
- Clade: Angiosperms
- Clade: Eudicots
- Clade: Asterids
- Order: Ericales
- Family: Ericaceae
- Genus: Rhododendron
- Subgenus: Rhododendron subg. Rhododendron; L.

Type species
- Rhododendron ferrugineum L.

Sections
- See text

= Rhododendron subg. Rhododendron =

Subgenus of flowering plants

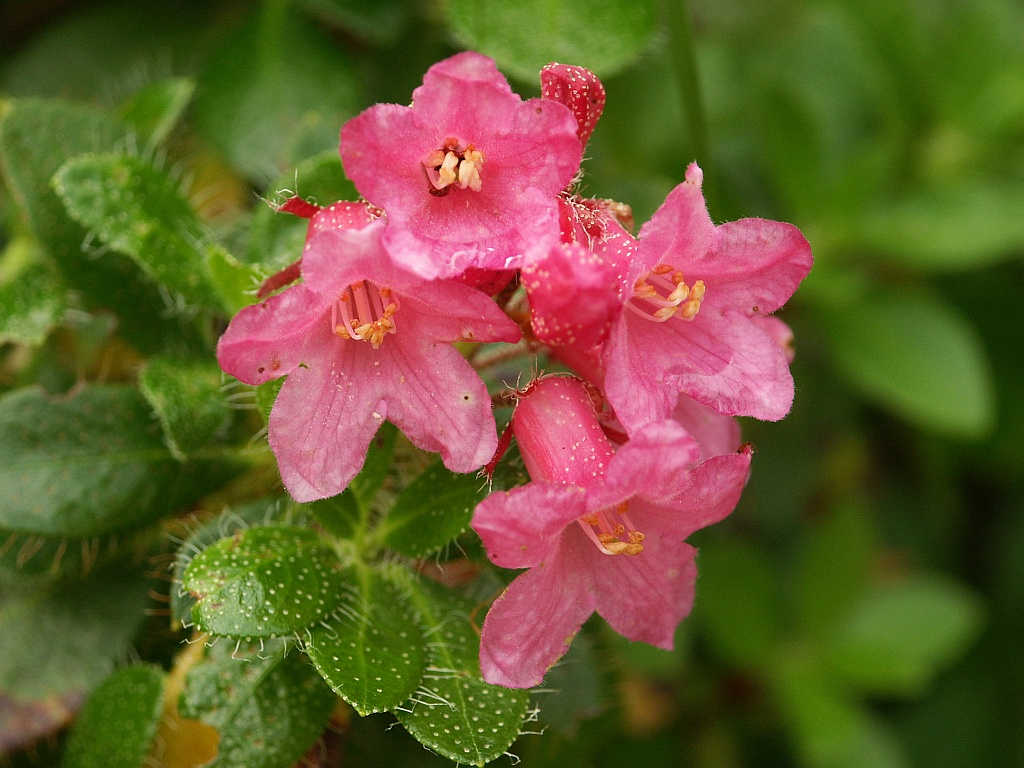
Rhododendron hirsutum

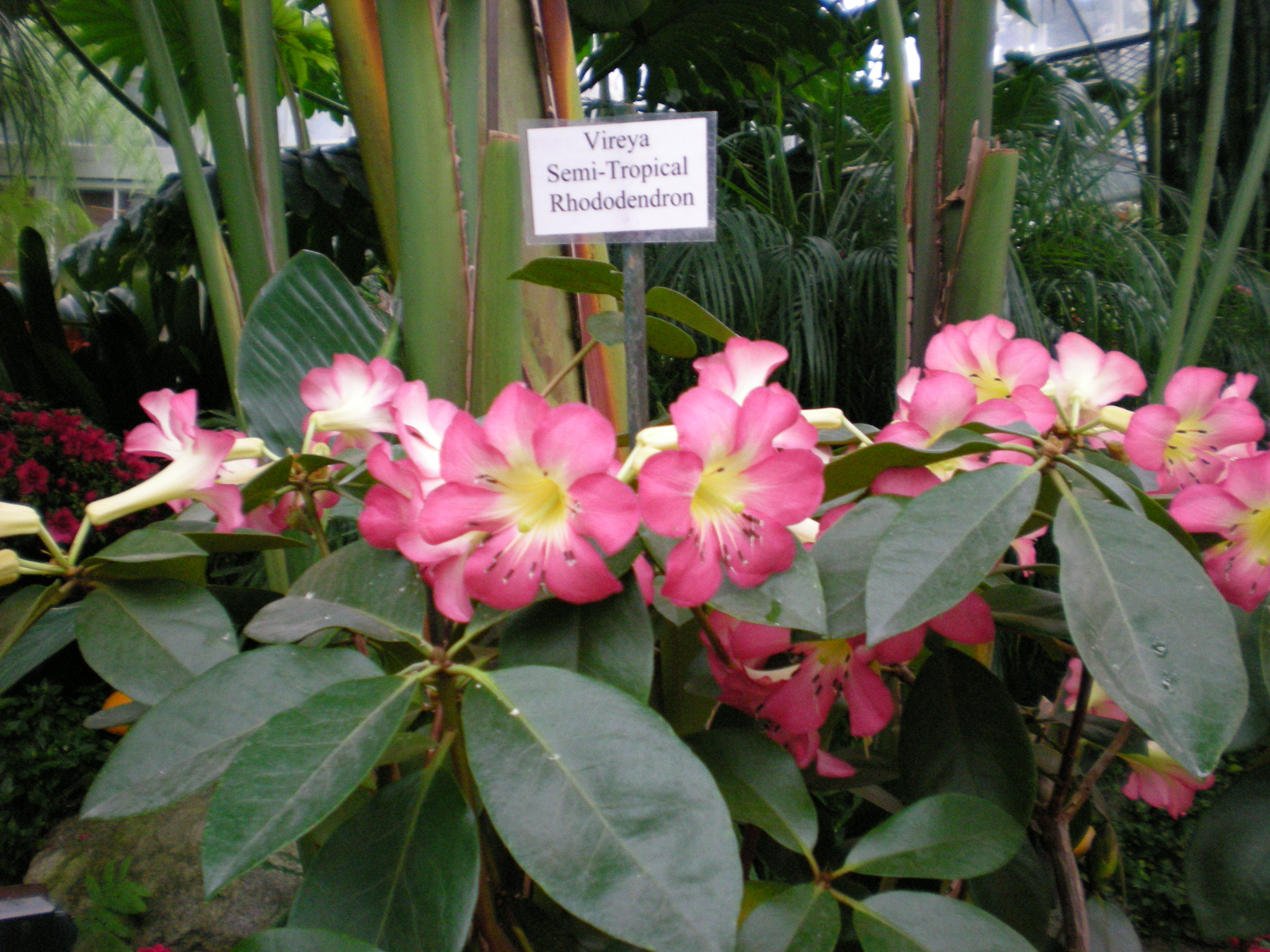
A species of the Vireya section.

Rhododendron subgenus Rhododendron is a subgenus of the genus Rhododendron. With around 400 species, it is the largest of the eight subgenera (more recently reduced to five) containing nearly half of all known species of Rhododendron and all of the lepidote species (i.e. those having scales on the underside of the leaves).

== Taxonomy ==
The subgenus has traditionally included three sections:

- Rhododendron sect. Pogonanthum Aitch. & Hemsl, type Rhododendron anthopogon D.Don. Six species; Himalaya and adjacent mountains
- Rhododendron sect. Rhododendron L., type : Rhododendron ferrugineum L. 120 - 149 species in 25 subsections; temperate to subarctic Northern Hemisphere
- Rhododendron sect. Vireya (Blume) Copel.f., type Rhododendron javanicum (Blume) Benn. About 300 species in 7 subsections; tropical southeast Asia, Australasia. Has at times been considered as a separate ninth subgenus.

However, following phylogenetic analysis, Craven (2008) raised the appropriately named Pseudovireya subsection of Vireya to section rank, splitting it into two geographic clades, the Asian mainland species as Pseudovireya, and the Malesian species as Discovireya, making five sections in all. The new sections are thus:

- Rhododendron sect. Discovireya (Sleumer) Argent, type Rhododendron retusum (Blume) Benn. 48 species, Malesia
- Rhododendron sect. Pseudodovireya (C.B.Clarke) Argent, type Rhododendron vaccinioides Hook.f. Ten species, Mainland Asia

Characteristics: (Craven 2008)

- Discovireya: Scales entire to undulate; corolla tubular-cylindric; stamens 10, exserted to included, staminal filaments glabrous or hairy from the base; capsule valves not twisting after dehiscence; seeds with a distinct tail at each end
- Pogonanthum: Scales incised; corolla salver-shaped; stamens 5–8, included, staminal filaments glabrous or hairy towards the base; capsule valves not twisting after dehiscence; seeds without distinct tails
- Pseudovireya: Scales entire; corolla campanulate; stamens 10, exserted, staminal filaments glabrous proximally and distally and hairy in the middle region; capsule valves not twisting after dehiscence; seeds with a distinct tail at each end
- Rhododendron: Scales entire to crenulate; corolla campanulate to funnel-shaped or tubular; stamens 10, exserted, staminal filaments hairy towards the base or glabrous; capsule valves not twisting after dehiscence; seeds without distinct tails
- Vireya: Scales sessile or sometimes stalked, lobed to deeply incised or sometimes entire; corolla campanulate, trumpet-like, salver-shaped, tubular or funnel-shaped; stamens (5–)10(–16), exserted to included, staminal filaments glabrous or hairy from the base; capsule valves twisting after dehiscence; seeds with a distinct tail at each end

Craven also provides a formal Key to the subgenus.

=== Subsections ===
  - Rhododendron L. (25 subsections)
    - Rhododendron subsect. Afghanica
    - Rhododendron subsect. Baileya
    - Rhododendron subsect. Boothia
    - Rhododendron subsect. Camelliiflora
    - Rhododendron subsect. Campylogynum
    - Rhododendron subsect. Caroliniana
    - Rhododendron subsect. Cinnabarinum
    - Rhododendron subsect. Edgeworthia
    - Rhododendron subsect. Fragariflora
    - Rhododendron subsect. Genestieriana
    - Rhododendron subsect. Glauca
    - Rhododendron subsect. Heliolepida
    - Rhododendron subsect. Lapponica
    - Rhododendron subsect. Ledum
    - Rhododendron subsect. Lepidota
    - Rhododendron subsect. Maddenia
    - Rhododendron subsect. Micrantha
    - Rhododendron subsect. Monantha
    - Rhododendron subsect. Moupinensia
    - Rhododendron subsect. Rhododendron
    - Rhododendron subsect. Rhodorastra
    - Rhododendron subsect. Saluenensia
    - Rhododendron subsect. Scabrifolia
    - Rhododendron subsect. Tephropepia
    - Rhododendron subsect. Trichoclada
    - Rhododendron subsect. Triflora
    - Rhododendron subsect. Uniflora
    - Rhododendron subsect. Virgata

== Bibliography ==
- Germplasm Resources Information Network: Rhododendron subgenus Rhododendron
- Huxley, A., ed. (1992). New RHS Dictionary of Gardening. Macmillan.
- Gillian K. Brown, Lyn A. Craven, Frank Udovicic and Pauline Y. Ladiges. Phylogenetic relationships of Rhododendron section Vireya (Ericaceae) inferred from the ITS nrDNA region. Australian Systematic Botany 19, 329–342. August 2006. 10.1071/SB05019
