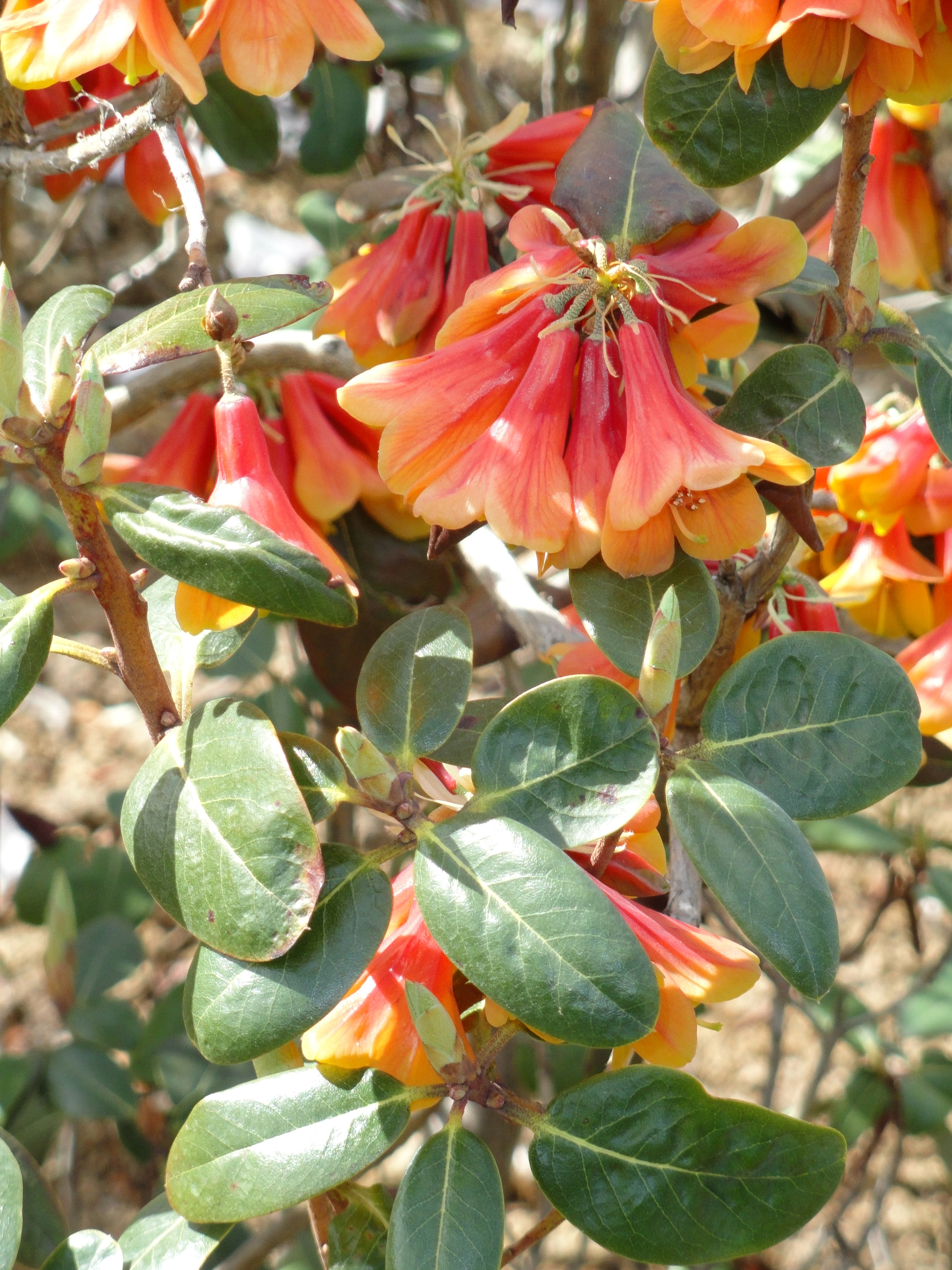

Scientific classification
- Kingdom: Plantae
- Clade: Tracheophytes
- Clade: Angiosperms
- Clade: Eudicots
- Clade: Asterids
- Order: Ericales
- Family: Ericaceae
- Genus: Rhododendron
- Species: R. cinnabarinum

Binomial name
- Rhododendron cinnabarinum Hook.f.

Synonyms
- Rhododendron blandfordiaeflorum; Rhododendron blandfordiiflorum Hook.f.; Rhododendron roylei Hook.f.; Rhododendron thibaudense

= Rhododendron cinnabarinum =

Species of flowering bush

Rhododendron cinnabarinum (朱砂杜鹃) is a rhododendron species native to eastern Nepal, Bhutan, Sikkim, southeastern Tibet, and southwest China, where it grows at altitudes of 1,900–4,000 m (6,200–13,100 ft). It is a straggling evergreen shrub that grows to 1–3 m (3.3–9.8 ft) in height, with leathery leaves that are broadly elliptic, oblong-elliptic to oblong-lanceolate or ovate, 3–6 by 1.5–2.5 cm in size. The flowers are yellow to cinnabar red, sometimes ranging to plum colors.

== Gallery ==
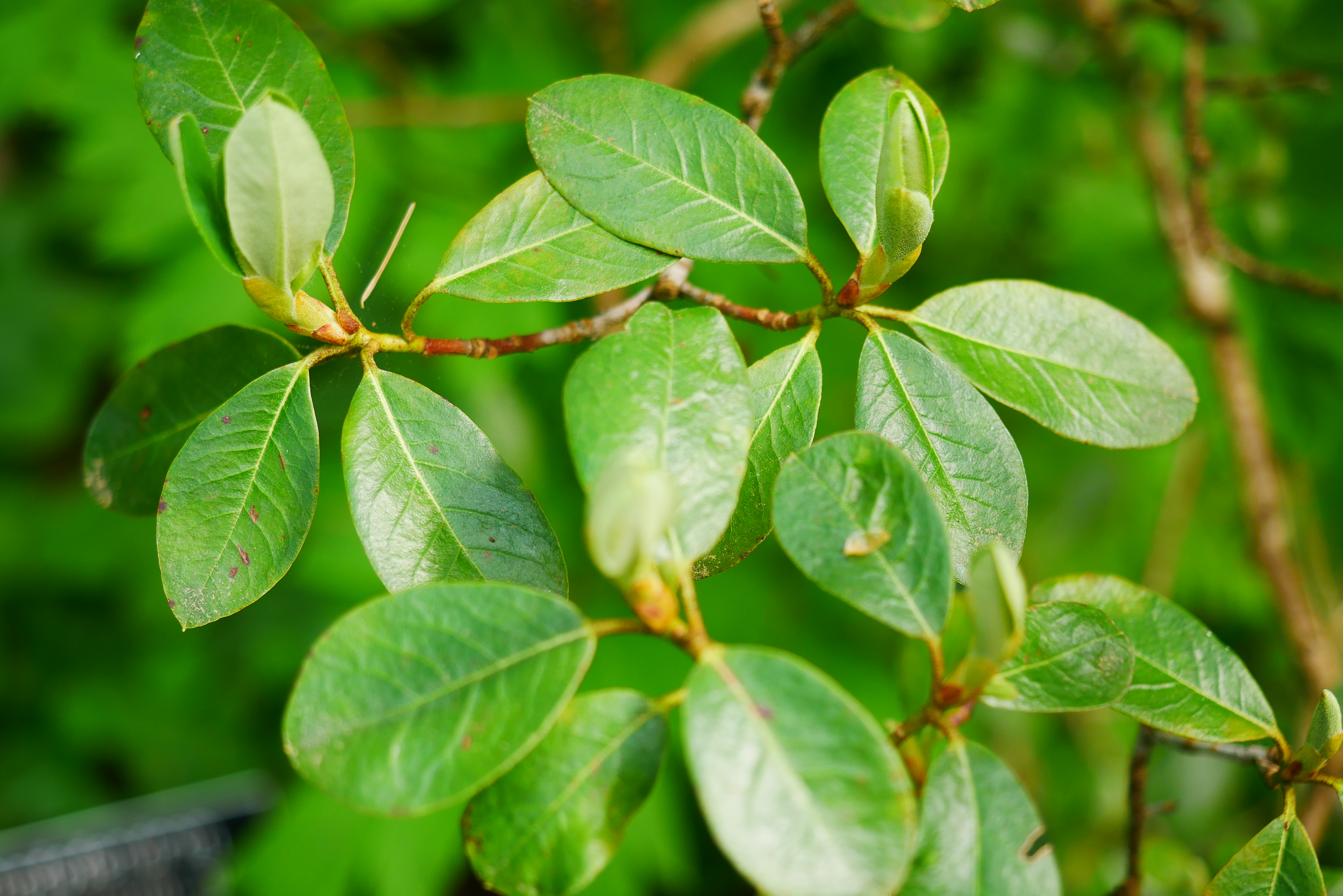
Close-up of leaves

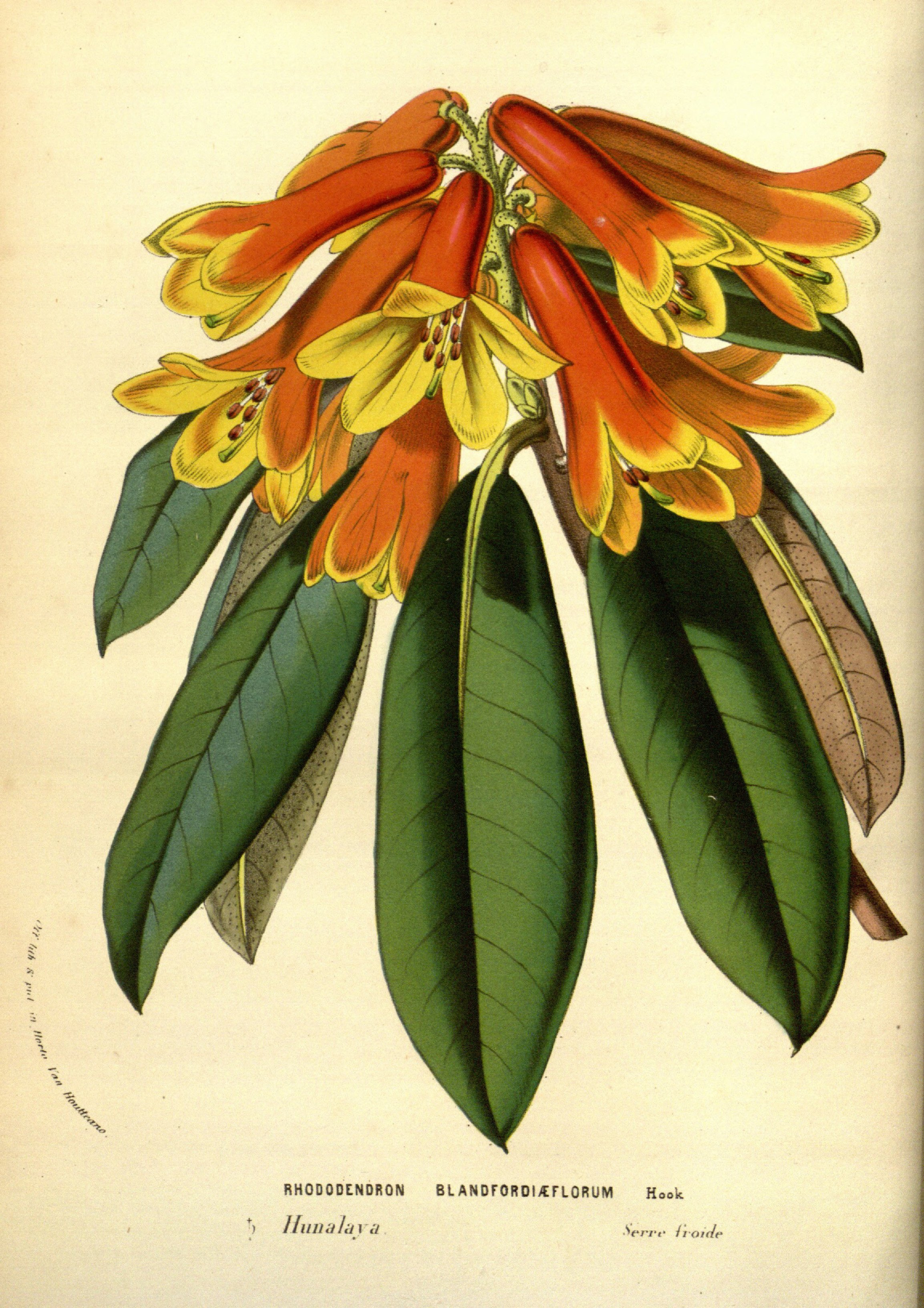
Illustration

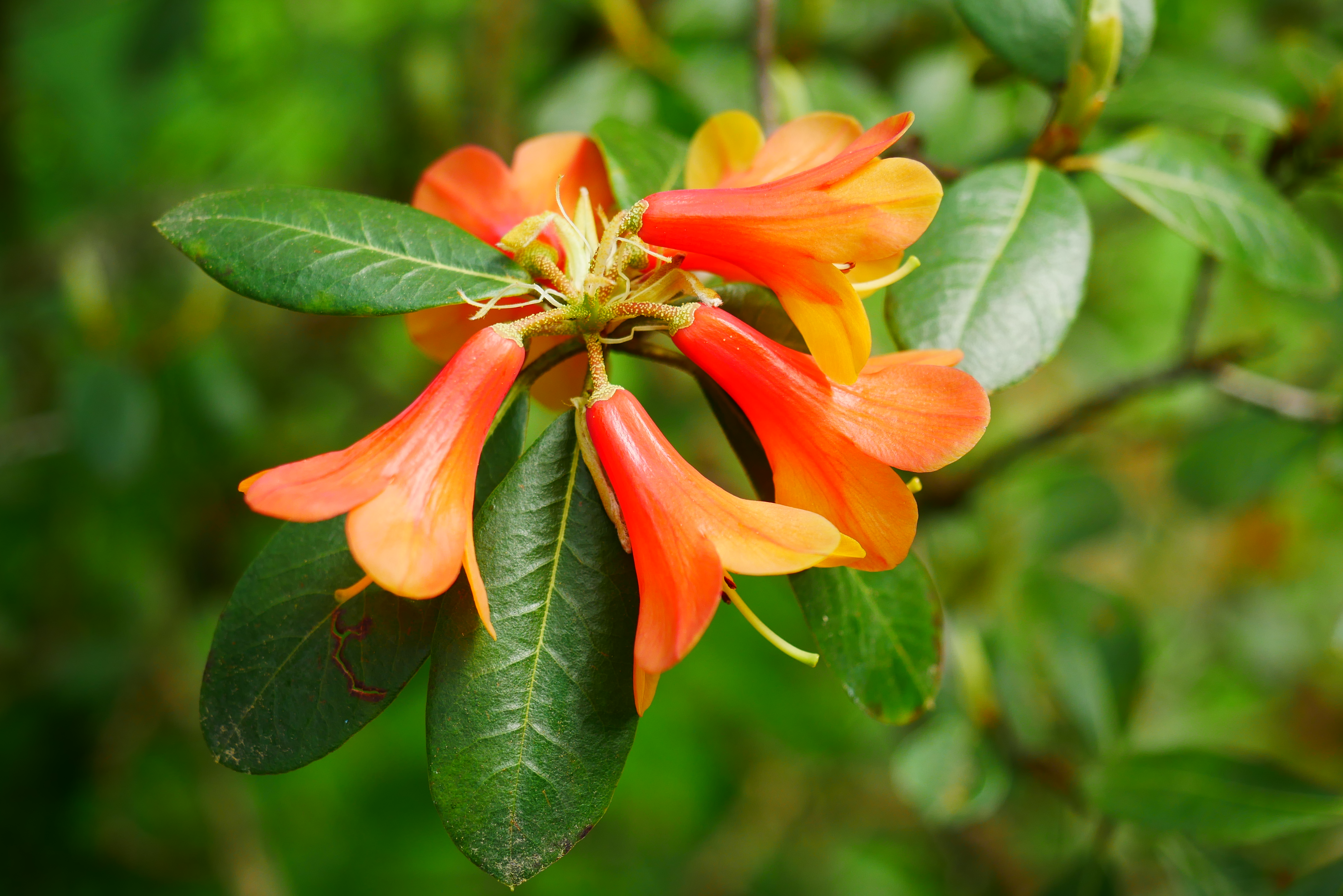
Rhododendron cinnabarinum flowers

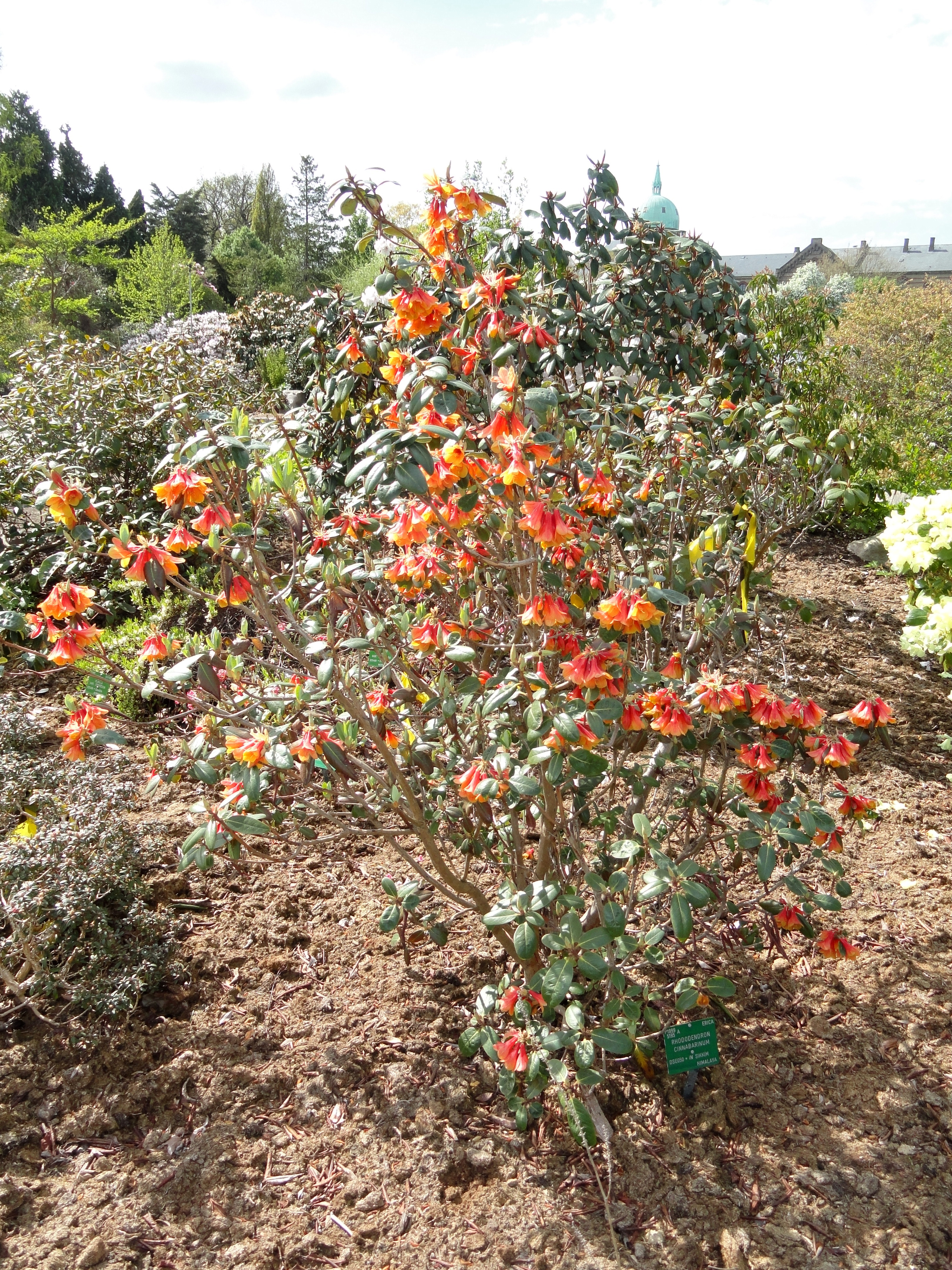
Shrub conformation
