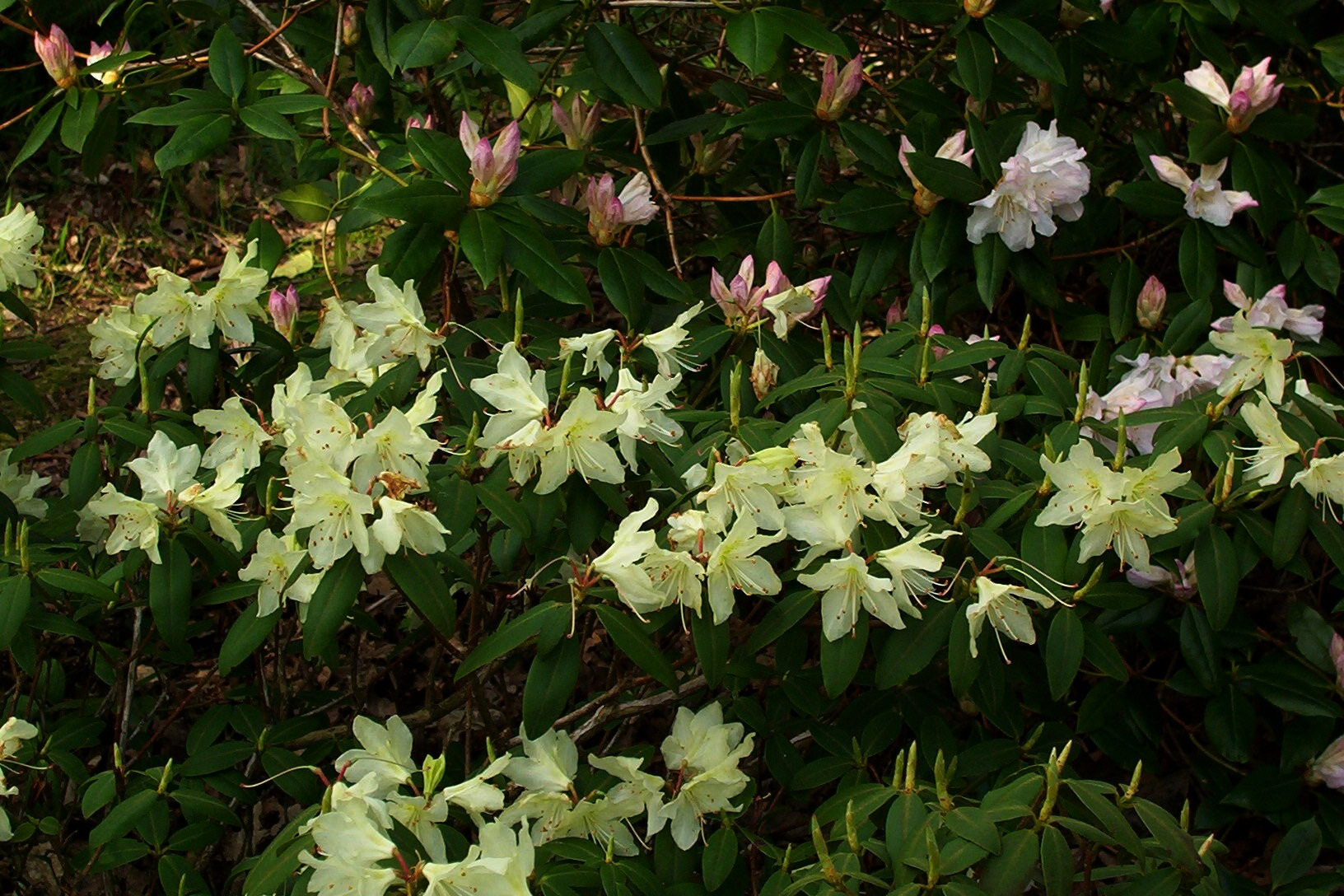

Scientific classification
- Kingdom: Plantae
- Clade: Tracheophytes
- Clade: Angiosperms
- Clade: Eudicots
- Clade: Asterids
- Order: Ericales
- Family: Ericaceae
- Genus: Rhododendron
- Species: R. keiskei

Binomial name
- Rhododendron keiskei Miq.

Synonyms
- Azalea jodogawa Hassk.; Azalea keiskei (Miq.) Kuntze

= Rhododendron keiskei =

Species of flowering plant

Rhododendron keiskei is a species of flowering plant in the heath family Ericaceae, native to Honshu, Kyushu and Shikoku in Japan.

It is a low-growing, spreading evergreen shrub, reaching only 60 cm (24 in) tall by 1.85 m (6.1 ft) broad when mature. The leaves are elliptic in shape, and the pale yellow flowers, each with ten prominent stamens, are abundantly produced in spring.

The specific epithet keiskei honours the Japanese botanist Keisuke Ito (1803–1901).

== Varieties ==
Two varieties are recorded:

- R. keiskei var. keiskei – does not tolerate freezing temperatures
- R. keiskei var. ozawae – prostrate shrub growing to only 30 cm (12 in), but hardy to −10 °F (−23 °C), and leaves shorter

== Cultivation ==
The slow-growing cultivar R. keiskei var. ozawae 'Yaku Fairy' has gained the Royal Horticultural Society's Award of Garden Merit.

This plant is best cultivated in a sheltered spot with moist acidic soil, in a partially shaded woodland setting.
