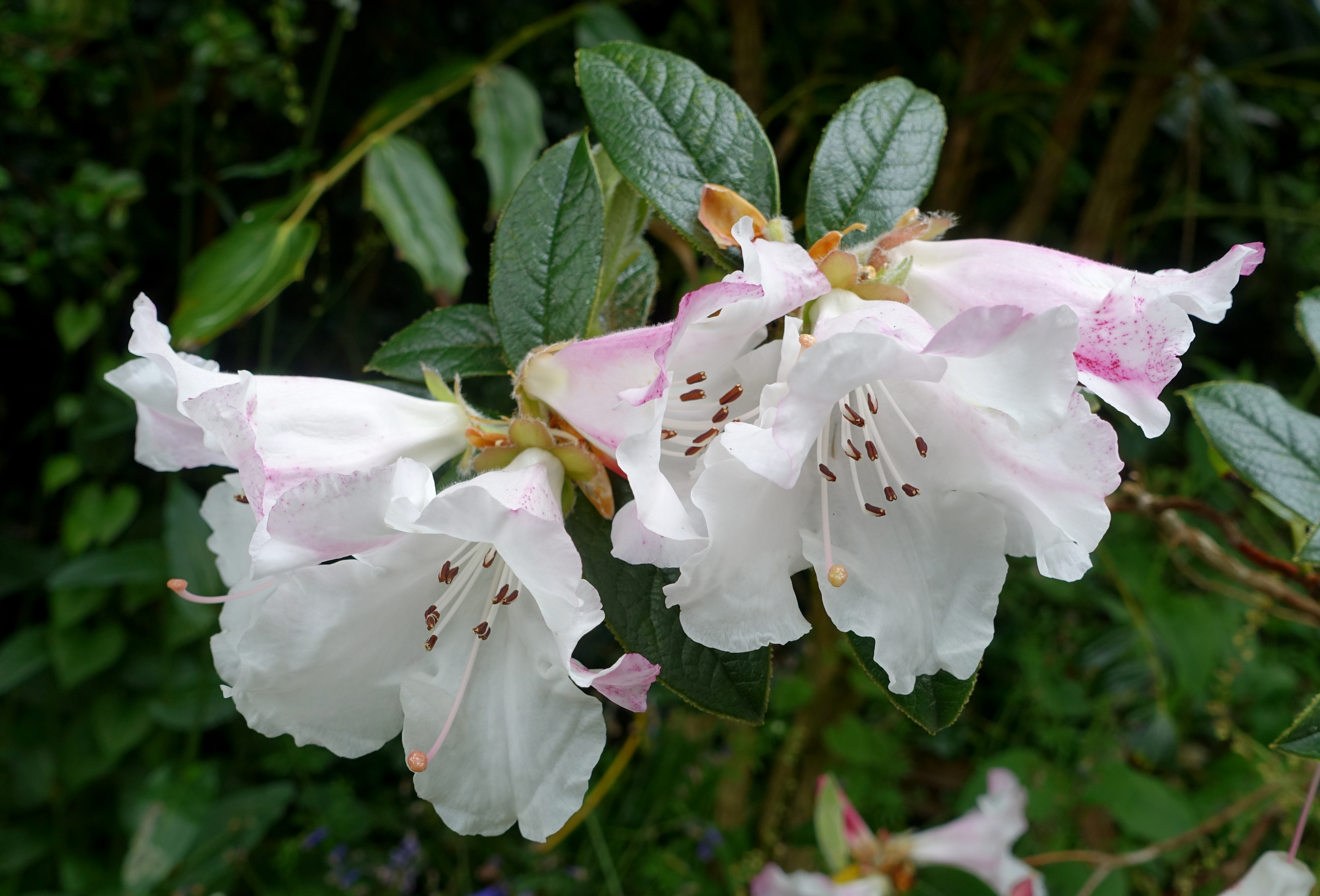

Scientific classification
- Kingdom: Plantae
- Clade: Embryophytes
- Clade: Tracheophytes
- Clade: Spermatophytes
- Clade: Angiosperms
- Clade: Eudicots
- Clade: Asterids
- Order: Ericales
- Family: Ericaceae
- Genus: Rhododendron
- Species: R. edgeworthii

Binomial name
- Rhododendron edgeworthii Hook.f.

Synonyms
- List: Azalea bullata (Franch.) Kuntze; Azalea edgeworthii (Hook.f.) Kuntze; Rhododendron bullatum Franch.; Rhododendron sciaphilum Balf.f. & Kingdon-Ward

= Rhododendron edgeworthii =

Species of flowering plant

Rhododendron edgeworthii, the Edgeworth rhododendron, is a species of flowering plant in the genus Rhododendron native to the eastern Himalaya, south-central China, Tibet, and Myanmar. It has gained the Royal Horticultural Society's Award of Garden Merit.
