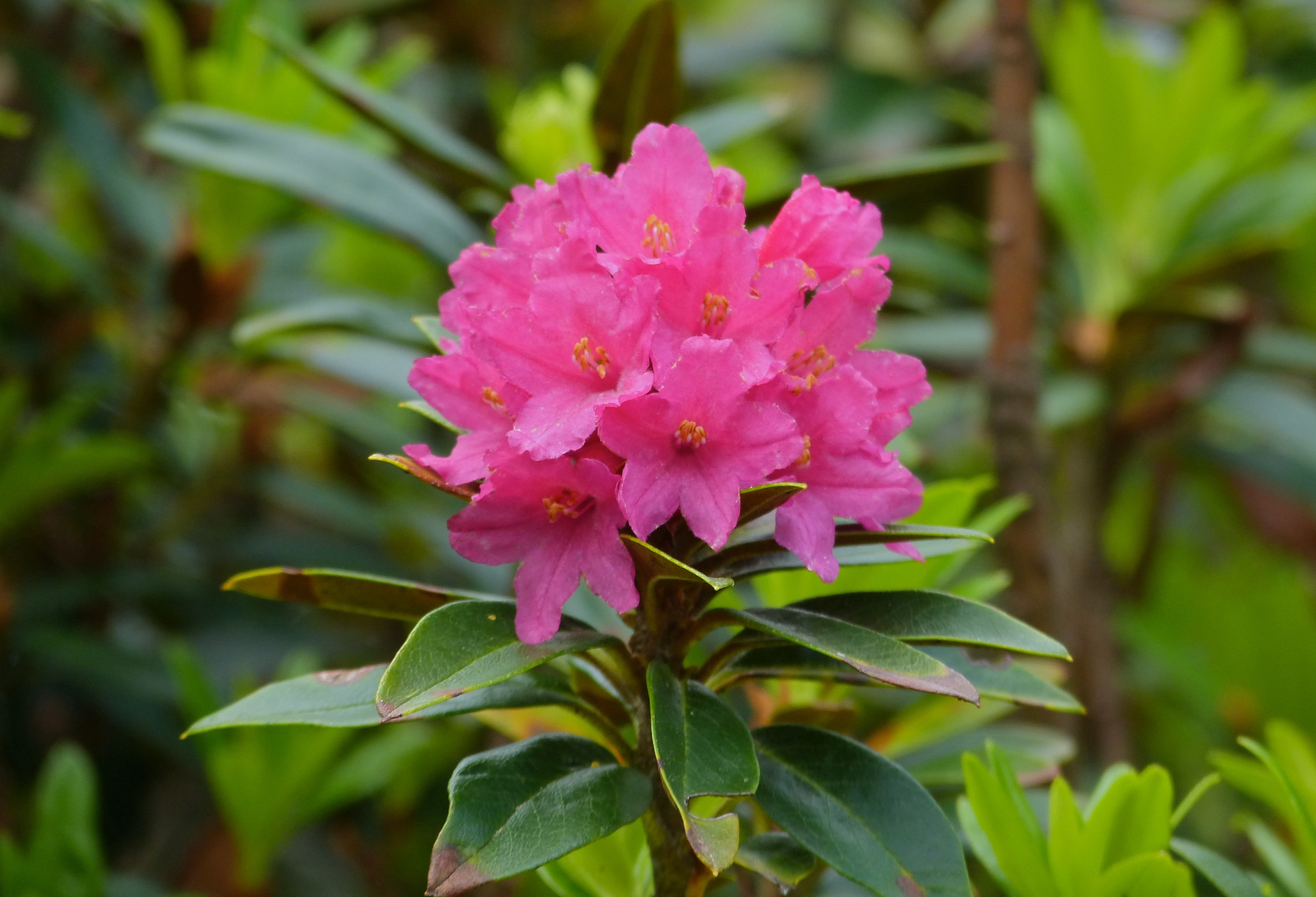

Conservation status
- Least Concern (IUCN 3.1)

Scientific classification
- Kingdom: Plantae
- Clade: Tracheophytes
- Clade: Angiosperms
- Clade: Eudicots
- Clade: Asterids
- Order: Ericales
- Family: Ericaceae
- Genus: Rhododendron
- Species: R. ferrugineum

Binomial name
- Rhododendron ferrugineum L.

= Rhododendron ferrugineum =

Species of plant

Rhododendron ferrugineum, the alpenrose, snow-rose, or rusty-leaved alpenrose is an evergreen shrub that grows just above the tree line in the Alps, Pyrenees, Jura Mountains and northern Apennine Mountains, on acid soils. It is the type species for the genus Rhododendron.

== Description ==
Rhododendron ferrugineum may grow up to 1.5 m (4.9 ft) tall and produces clusters of pinkish-red, bell-shaped flowers throughout the summer. The undersides of the leaves are covered in rust-brown spots, which give the species the second part of its binomial name (ferrugineum, Latin for 'rust-coloured, ferruginous'). This is in contrast to Rhododendron hirsutum, which has no such brown colouring, has hairy edges to the leaves and grows over limestone. Where the two species co-occur (usually on soils of intermediate pH), the hybrid Rhododendron × intermedium may occur; as its name suggests, it is intermediate in form between the two parental species.

== Habitat ==
Rhododendron ferrugineum grows primarily on acidic siliceous soils, whereas its close relative Rhododendron hirsutum grows on basic carbonate-rich soils. These two types of soils frequently occur near each other in the Alps.

== Toxicity ==
Rhododendron ferrugineum is moderately toxic, containing arbutin, arecoline and rhodoxanthin, and it can cause vomiting and difficulties of the digestive, nervous, respiratory and circulatory systems.
