= Rhodora (disambiguation) =

Rhodora may refer to:

== Rhododendrons ==
- Rhododendron canadense, a deciduous flowering shrub in the subgenus Pentanthera
- Rhododendron sect. Rhodora, a discontinued section of subgenus Pentanthera

== Other uses ==
- The Rhodora, an 1834 poem by Ralph Waldo Emerson
- Rhodora (horse), a racehorse
- Rhodora (journal), a scholarly journal
- Rhodora Cadiao, Filipina politician
