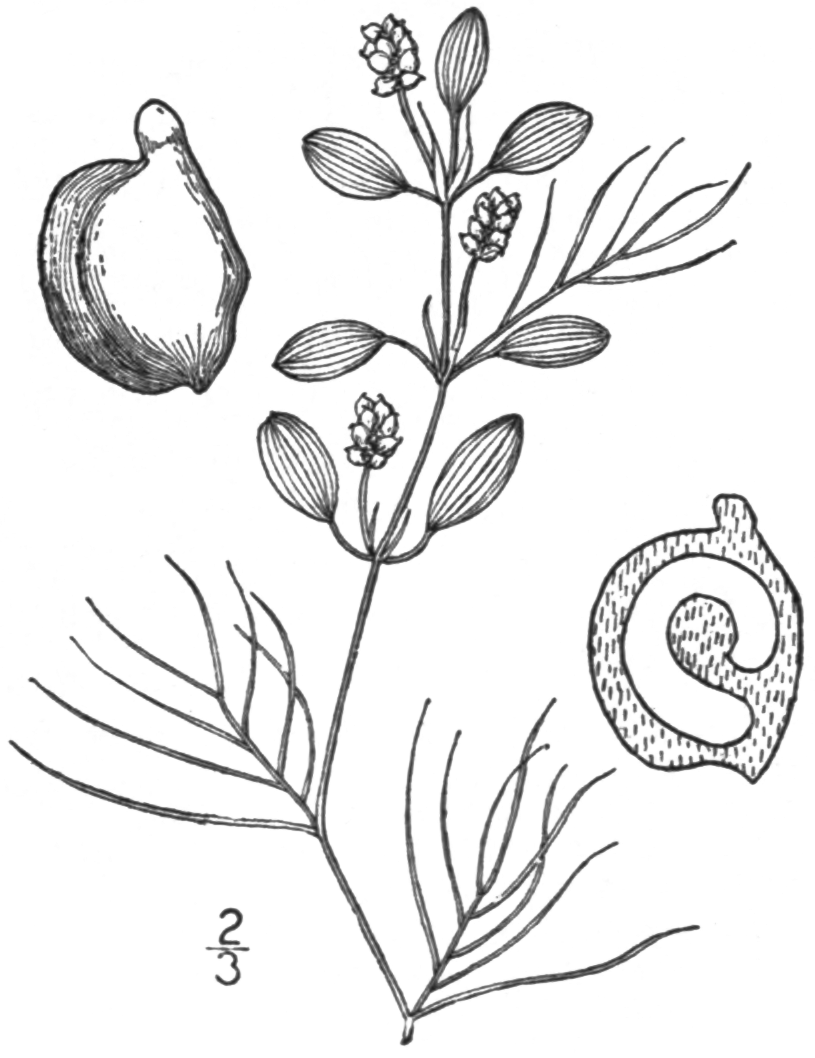

Conservation status
- Secure (NatureServe)

Scientific classification
- Kingdom: Plantae
- Clade: Tracheophytes
- Clade: Angiosperms
- Clade: Monocots
- Order: Alismatales
- Family: Potamogetonaceae
- Genus: Potamogeton
- Species: P. vaseyi

Binomial name
- Potamogeton vaseyi J.W.Robbins

= Potamogeton vaseyi =

Species of plant

Potamogeton vaseyi is a species of flowering plant in the pondweed family Potamogetonaceae. It is native to North America. The specific epithet vaseyi honors the American botanist George Vasey. The species is commonly called Vasey's pondweed.

== Taxonomy ==
Potamogeton vaseyi was named and described by the American botanist James Watson Robbins in 1867. The type specimen was collected by Dr. George Vasey near Ringwood in McHenry County, Illinois.

== Distribution and habitat ==
Potamogeton vaseyi is native to northeastern North America. In the United States, it is most common in New York.

== Conservation ==
According to NatureServe, Potamogeton vaseyi is globally secure (G5). It is listed as an endangered species in Indiana, Massachusetts, and Pennsylvania, and is listed as threatened in Connecticut, Maine, Michigan, and New Hampshire, and as presumed extirpated in Ohio.

== Bibliography ==
- Robbins, J. W. (1867). "Potamogeton Tourn. (Pondweed)". In Gray, Asa (ed.). Manual of the botany of the northern United States. New York: Ivison, Phinney, Blakeman, and Co. pp. 484–490.
