= Flora Nancy Vasey =

American botanical collector (1861–1917)

- Born: 1861; Illinois, United States
- Died: 1917 (aged 55–56); Washington, D.C.
- Other name: F. N. Vasey
- Occupation: Botanical collector
- Employer: USDA
- Father: George Vasey
- Relatives: George Richard Vasey (brother)

Flora Nancy Vasey (February 1861 – 24 November 1917) was an American botanical collector. Her specimens are labeled with the name F. N. Vasey. She was the daughter of Dr. George Vasey, a physician and botanist. Like her father, she worked at the United States Department of Agriculture.

== Life ==
Based on United States census data, Flora Nancy Vasey was born in McHenry County, Illinois, circa 1861. Some sources claim she was born in 1863, but her father announced her birth in a letter dated February 25, 1861.

Flora Vasey was the daughter of Dr. George Vasey and Martha Jane Scott, the sixth of seven children. Her parents were married in New York in 1846 but by the time she was born, the family lived in Ringwood, Illinois where her father practiced medicine. Her mother died when she was about 5 years old. Her father became Chief Botanist at the United States Department of Agriculture (USDA) in 1872. By 1880, the Vasey family had moved to Washington, D.C. Eventually Flora Vasey became a clerk at the USDA. Both she and her brother, George Richard Vasey, were botanical collectors.

Flora Vasey died in Washington, D.C. on 24 November 1917, and was buried in Rock Creek Cemetery two days later.

Flora Nancy Vasey did not author any botanical names.
