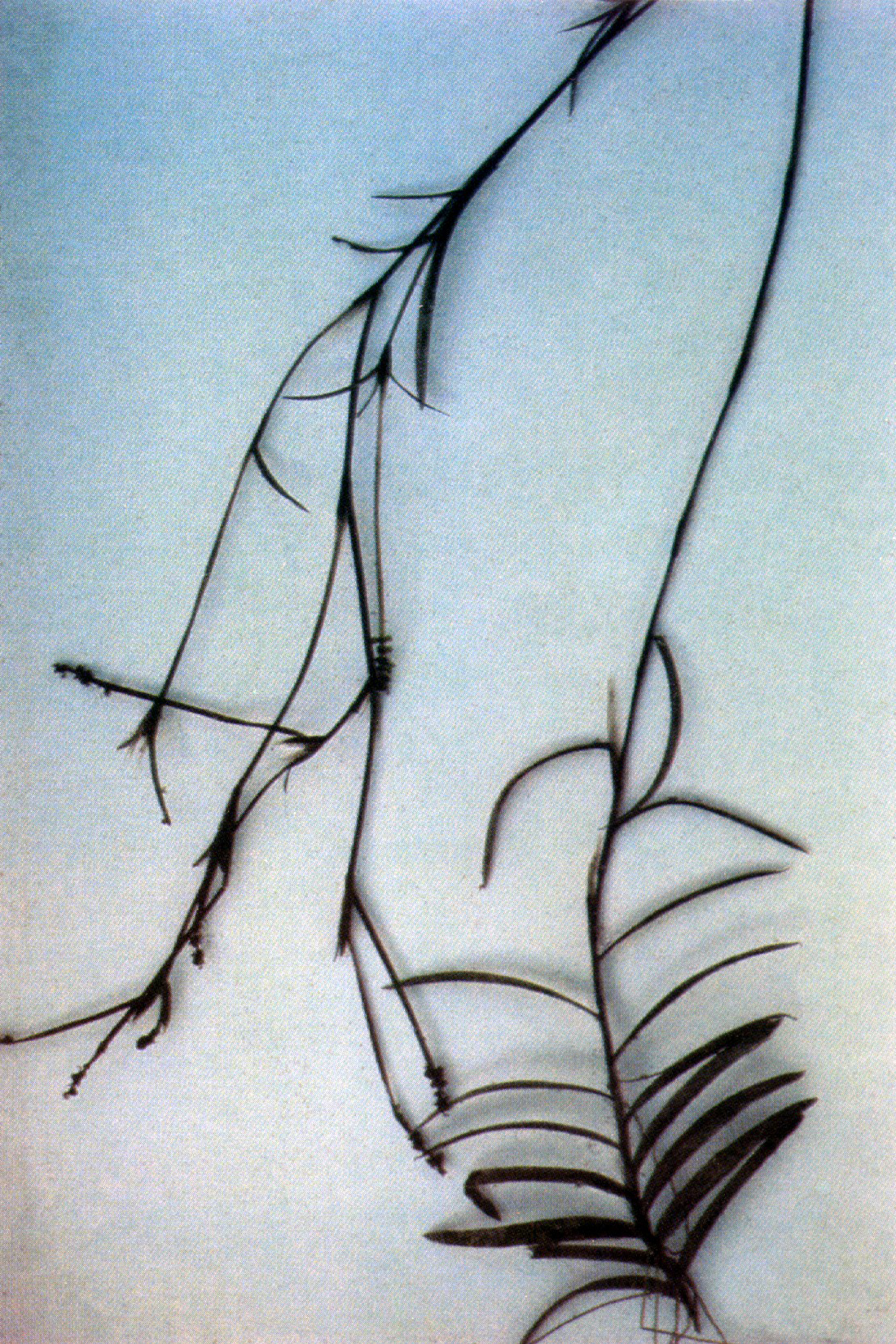

Scientific classification
- Kingdom: Plantae
- Clade: Tracheophytes
- Clade: Angiosperms
- Clade: Monocots
- Order: Alismatales
- Family: Potamogetonaceae
- Genus: Potamogeton
- Species: P. robbinsii

Binomial name
- Potamogeton robbinsii Oakes

= Potamogeton robbinsii =

Species of plant

Potamogeton robbinsii, commonly known as Robbins' pondweed, is a North American perennial herb. The specific epithet robbinsii is named in honor of James Watson Robbins, the pioneer student of the genus.

It is found in deep to shallow, quiet, often muddy waters of lakes, ponds, and rivers.

== Description ==
The rootstock of Potamogeton robbinsii lacks tubers. The stems root from the lower nodes, and sterile stems are either simple or widely branching and are feather-like, covered with sheathing whitish stipules. The sterile stems measure 10–90 cm (3.9–35.4 in) long. Flowering stems grow up to 2 m (6 ft 7 in) tall. Leaves on the sterile stems are linear, stiff, and grow opposite on the stem, measuring 3–8 mm (0.12–0.31 in) long. Leaves are densely crowded on sterile stems, are auricled at their base, and have a minutely serrated margin. The tip of the fibrous pale stipule is as long or longer than its sheath. Leaves born on flowering stems are remote and reduced, with stipules with shorter tips. The branching inflorescence bears one to twenty-six straight peduncles with stiff and interrupted spikes that grow .7–2 cm (0.28–0.79 in) long. The plant fruits rarely, with flattened fruit that measures 4–5 mm (0.16–0.20 in) long and 2.7–3.3 mm (0.11–0.13 in) wide. The fruit has a prominent keel with an approximately central beak 1 mm (0.039 in) long.

It flowers from August to September.

The plant may form dense colonies that carpet the muddy substrates of riverbottoms and lakebeds. It rarely flowers, but when it does it is very easy to identify, as it is the only Potamogeton species that has branching inflorescences.
