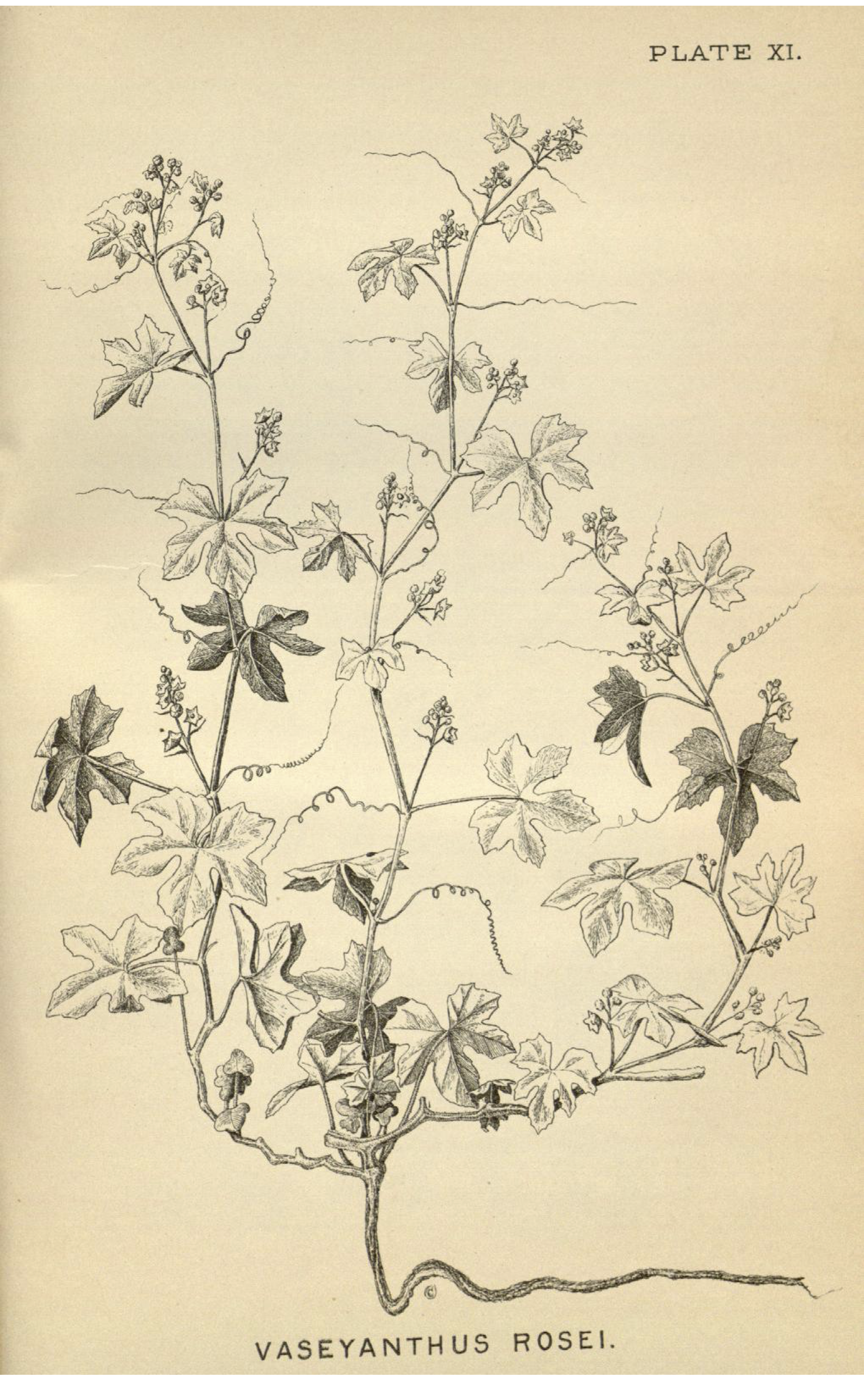
- Vaseyanthus rosei

Scientific classification
- Kingdom: Plantae
- Clade: Tracheophytes
- Clade: Angiosperms
- Clade: Eudicots
- Clade: Rosids
- Order: Cucurbitales
- Family: Cucurbitaceae
- Genus: Echinopepon
- Species: E. rosei

Binomial name
- Echinopepon rosei (Cogn.) H.Schaef. & S.S.Renner

= Echinopepon rosei =

Species of flowering plant

Echinopepon rosei is a species of flowering plant in the gourd family Cucurbitaceae.

== Taxonomy ==
Echinopepon rosei was first described as Vaseyanthus rosei by the Belgian botanist Célestin Alfred Cogniaux in 1891. The generic name Vaseyanthus honors the "learned botanist" Dr. George Vasey, who was then the Chief Botanist at the United States Department of Agriculture. The specific epithet rosei honors Joseph Nelson Rose, Vasey's "aide and distinguished collaborator". Vaseyanthus rosei was placed in genus Echinopepon in 2011. As of January 2025, Echinopepon rosei (Cogn.) H.Schaef. & S.S.Renner is a widely accepted name.

== Bibliography ==
- Cogniaux, Alfred (1891). "A new cucurbit". Zoe; a Biological Journal. 1 (12): 368–369.
