= Echinocystis macrocarpa =

Echinocystis macrocarpa can refer to:

- Echinocystis macrocarpa Britton, a synonym of Echinopepon racemosus (Steud.) C.Jeffrey
- Echinocystis macrocarpa Greene, a synonym of Marah macrocarpa (Greene) Greene
