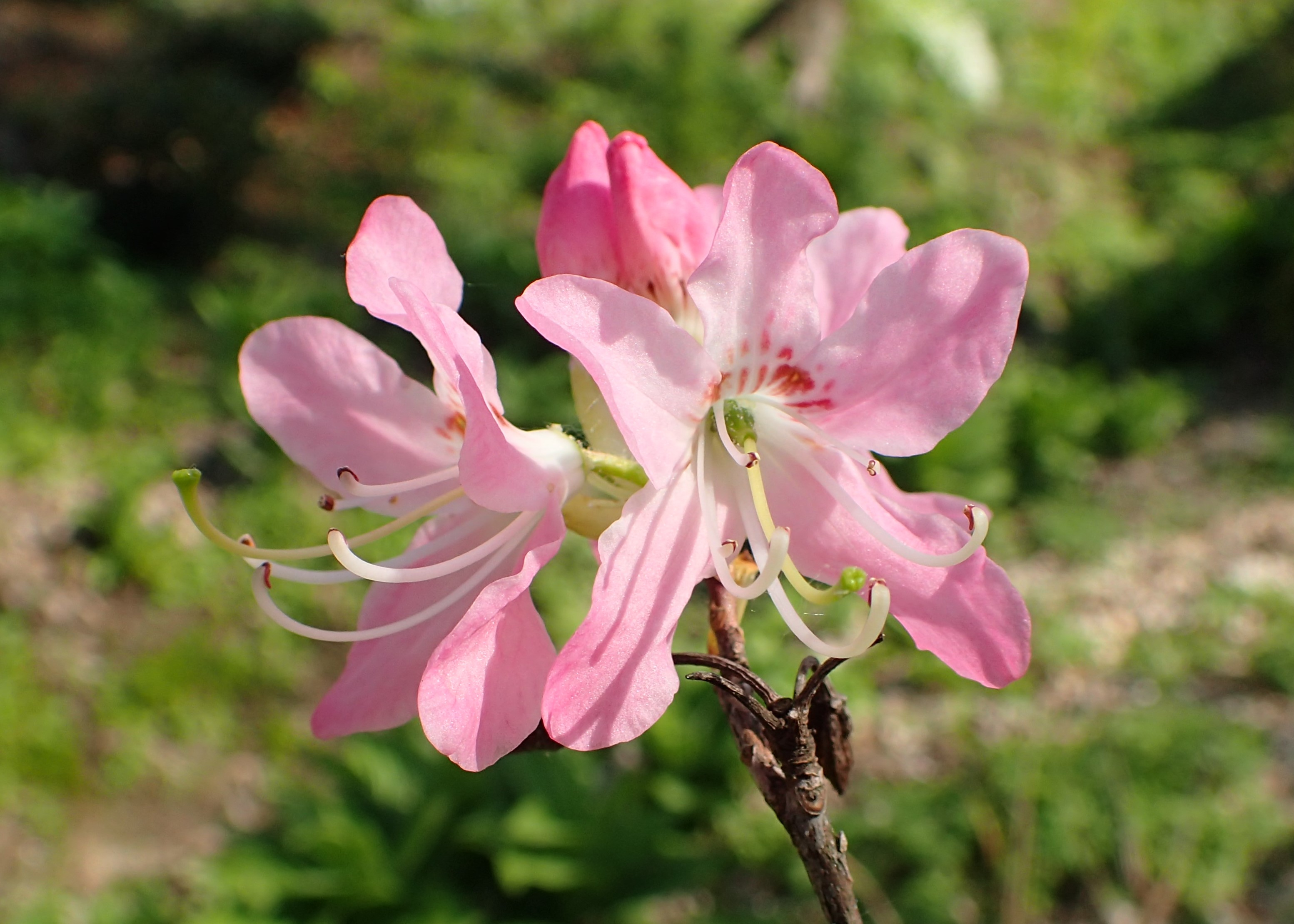
- Rhododendron vaseyi

Scientific classification
- Kingdom: Plantae
- Clade: Embryophytes
- Clade: Tracheophytes
- Clade: Spermatophytes
- Clade: Angiosperms
- Clade: Eudicots
- Clade: Asterids
- Order: Ericales
- Family: Ericaceae
- Genus: Rhododendron
- Subgenus: Rhododendron subg. Hymenanthes
- Section: Rhododendron sect. Rhodora (L.) G.Don 1834

Type species
- Rhododendron canadense

Species
- See text

= Rhododendron sect. Rhodora =

Section of flowering plants

Rhodora was a section of subgenus Pentanthera in the genus Rhododendron, that has since been discontinued.

== Description ==
The section was closely related to sect. Pentanthera, differing from it in the flower corolla having only three lobes, rather than five, the upper three lobes of sect. Pentanthera being joined into a single three-lipped lobe in sect. Rhodora.

== Taxonomy ==
The distinct floral structure resulted in Rhodora being treated as a distinct genus at one time. Treating it as such though resulted in the remainder of the genus Rhododendron being paraphyletic. However detailed phylogenetic analysis revealed that Rhodora was not a distinct entity, but rather polyphyletic, and it was disassembled, each species being allocated to other sections. Rhododendron canadense was moved to section Pentanethera, subgenus Hymenanthes and Rhododendron vaseyi was moved to section Sciadorhodion, which then became a new section of subgenus Azaleastrum.

It comprised two species, both deciduous shrubs native to eastern North America:

Image	Name	Distribution
	Rhododendron canadense (L.) Torr.	Canada in Newfoundland and extends into eastern Ontario and the United States from New York, New Jersey, and at high altitudes in the Appalachian Mountains further south to Pennsylvania.
	Rhododendron vaseyi A.Gray	North Carolina

== Bibliography ==
- Germplasm Resources Information Network: Rhododendron sect. Rhodora
- Huxley, A., ed. (1992). New RHS Dictionary of Gardening. Macmillan.
- Chamberlain, D.; Royal Botanic Garden, Edinburgh (1996). The genus Rhododendron : its classification and synonymy. Edinburgh: Royal Botanic Garden, Edinburgh. ISBN 1-872291-66-X. OCLC 34886265. Archived from the original on 14 July 2014.
- Craven, L.A.; Goetsch, L.A.; Hall, B.D.; Brown, G.K. (2008). "Classification of the Vireya group of Rhododendron (Ericaceae)". Blumea - Biodiversity, Evolution and Biogeography of Plants. 53 (2): 435. doi:10.3767/000651908X608070.
