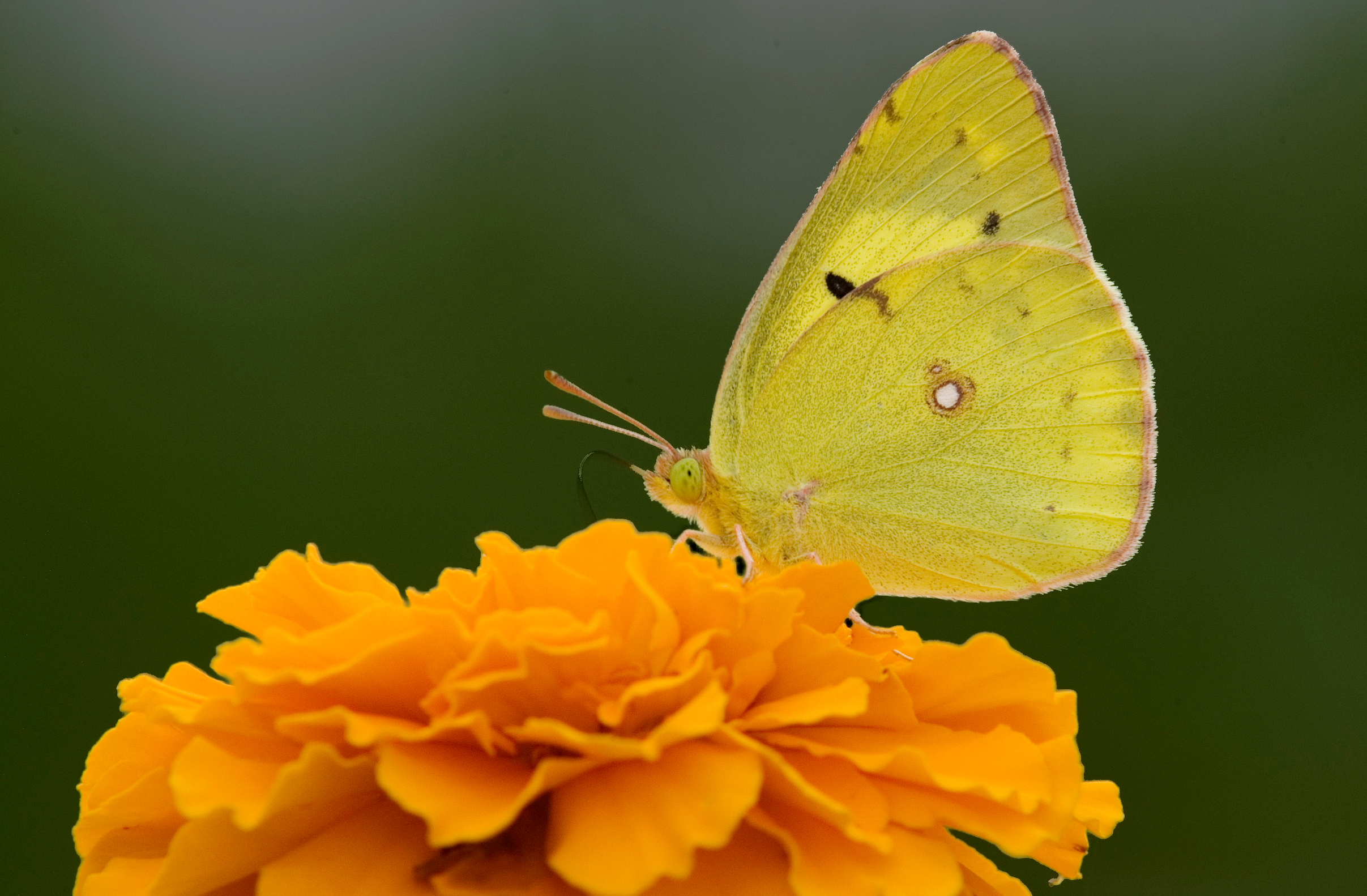
- C. e. poliographus

Scientific classification
- Kingdom: Animalia
- Phylum: Arthropoda
- Clade: Pancrustacea
- Class: Insecta
- Order: Lepidoptera
- Family: Pieridae
- Genus: Colias
- Species: C. erate

Binomial name
- Colias erate (Esper, 1805)

Synonyms
- Papilio erate Esper, 1803; Colias electo ab. kostlani Strand, 1911; Colias erate marnoana f. solilucis Berger, 1953; Colias erate marnoana f. androides Storace, 1956; Colias neriene Fischer von Waldheim, 1823; Colias afghana O. Bang-Haas, 1927; Colias albida Rühl, 1893; Colias androconiata Jachontov, 1910; Colias beckeri Gerhard, 1882; Colias erate edusoides Verity, 1908; Colias erate benesignata Sheljuzhko, 1913; Colias chryseis Röber, 1907; Colias chrysodona Boisduval, 1840; Colias chrysohyaleoides Verity, 1908; Colias chrysopallida Verity, 1908; Colias chrysothemoides Verity, 1908; Colias citronea Mezger, 1932; Colias conjuncta Verity, 1908; Colias costaenigrata Mezger, 1932; Colias diffusa Verity, 1908; Colias flavomaculata Mezger, 1932; Colias garica Verity, 1911; Colias helichta Lederer, 1853; Colias helichta Talbot, 1935; Colias erate erate f. androconiata Jachontov, 1910; Colias hyaleoides Grum-Grshimailo, 1890; Colias erate ab. maculigena Avinoff, 1910; Colias pallida Staudinger, 1861; Colias parva Rühl, 1893; Colias semifaillaei Pionneau, 1928; Colias unimaculata Pionneau, 1928; Colias chrysocoma Grum-Grshimailo, 1893; Colias hera Grum-Grshimailo, 1893; Colias erate gigantea Verity, 1911; Colias erate tania Hemming, 1933; Colias glicia Fruhstorfer, 1910; Colias kachgarica Verity, 1911; Colias poliographus Motschulsky, 1860; Colias simoda de l'Orza, 1869; Colias immamis Verity, 1911; Colias murina Fruhstorfer, 1910; Colias napata Fruhstorfer, 1910; Colias pyxagathus Fruhstorfer, 1910; Colias hyale zuzuki Matsumura, 1908; Colias tokotana Bryk, 1942

= Colias erate =

Eastern pale clouded yellow

Species of butterfly

Colias erate, commonly known as the eastern pale clouded yellow, is a species of butterfly in the family Pieridae. It is found from south-eastern Europe, through Turkey over Central Asia up to Japan and Taiwan. To the south, its range stretches to Somalia and Ethiopia. The species was first described by Eugenius Johann Christoph Esper in 1805.

The butterfly flies in May to September in two generations.

The larvae feed on various Fabaceae species, such as Medicago sativa and Medicago, Trifolium, Onobrychis and Melilotus species.

== Subspecies ==
- C. e. erate (Ukraine, Turkey, Lebanon, Bulgaria, Romania, Macedonia, Greece, Hungary, Austria, Turkmenistan, Kazakhstan, Kirhizia, Uzbekistan, Tajikistan, Afghanistan)
- C. e. amdensis Verity, 1911 (China: Qinghai, Gansu, Sichuan)
- C. e. marnoana Rogenhofer, 1884 (Sudan, Ethiopia, south-western Arabia)
- C. e. sinensis Verity, 1911 (Mandschuria, North Korea)
- C. e. formosana Shirôzu, 1955 (Taiwan)
- C. e. lativitta Moore, 1882 (Nepal, northern India)
- C. e. poliographus Motschulsky, 1860 (Mongolia, Japan, Amur, Ussuri, Sakhalin, Tian Shan)
- C. e. tomarias Bryk, 1942 (Kuriles)
- C. e. naukratis Fruhstorfer, 1909 (Altai, southern Siberia, Transbaikalia)
- C. e. nilagiriensis C. & R. Felder, 1859 (southern India)

== Description ==
The wingspan is 23–26 mm. the Central Asian butterflies are generally larger than European ones. C. erate has slightly more pointed wingtips than related species. Like most Colias species, Colias erate has yellow ground colouration. Females with whitish tinged wings are sometimes found in Europe and predominate in Central Asia. The butterflies are extremely variable in their colouring and therefore very difficult to distinguish from similar species of the same genus. The wing tops are lemon yellow in color and have a broad black colored outer edge. Around the wing tip, the black also runs towards the leading edge. In the males the black is strong and only with little or no yellow submarginal spots interspersed, in the females it is pale and moreover includes several such spots. Approximately in the middle of the forewing, slightly offset from the front edge, there is a small black spot. The upper sides of the hind wings are also colored lemon yellow, but lightly dusted with dark. A large part of the outer edge is also darkly edged, but not as broadly. In the females, the black is again significantly paler and in places interrupted by yellow. There is an orange spot in the middle of the wing. The undersides of both pairs of wings are more strongly coloured yellow and slightly dusted with dark olive green. The entire edge is finely reddish edged. The black spot on the forewings is also found on the underside along with a few other submarginal spots along the outer edge. Instead of the orange spot, there is a lighter, reddish-edged spot on the hind wings, bordered by another very small spot. The dark row of submarginal spots on the forewings continues on the outer edge of the hindwings, but is only faintly discernible.

Frederic Moore (1882) gives a detailed description for C. e. lativitta:

Male. Yellow: fore wing with a broad unspotted blackish band, the inner border of which is angulated inward at the upper median vein; the band very sparsely yellow-speckled on the anterior veins; discocellular spot large, black: hind wing with a broad blackish crenulated band and a large orange-yellow discocellular spot. Underside olivaceous yellow: fore wing with a black discocellular spot and a distinct discal row of spots: hind wing with a moderate-sized dull pearly-white red-bordered discocellular spot.

Female. Yellow, or white; the band on fore wing broader than in male, and with not very prominent upper and lower yellow spots; the discocellular spot distinct: hind wing darker, with broad marginal band traversed inwardly by large ill-defined yellow spots; discocellular spot brighter red.

Expanse 1 5/8 to 2 2/8 inches.

— Frederic Moore

== Gallery ==
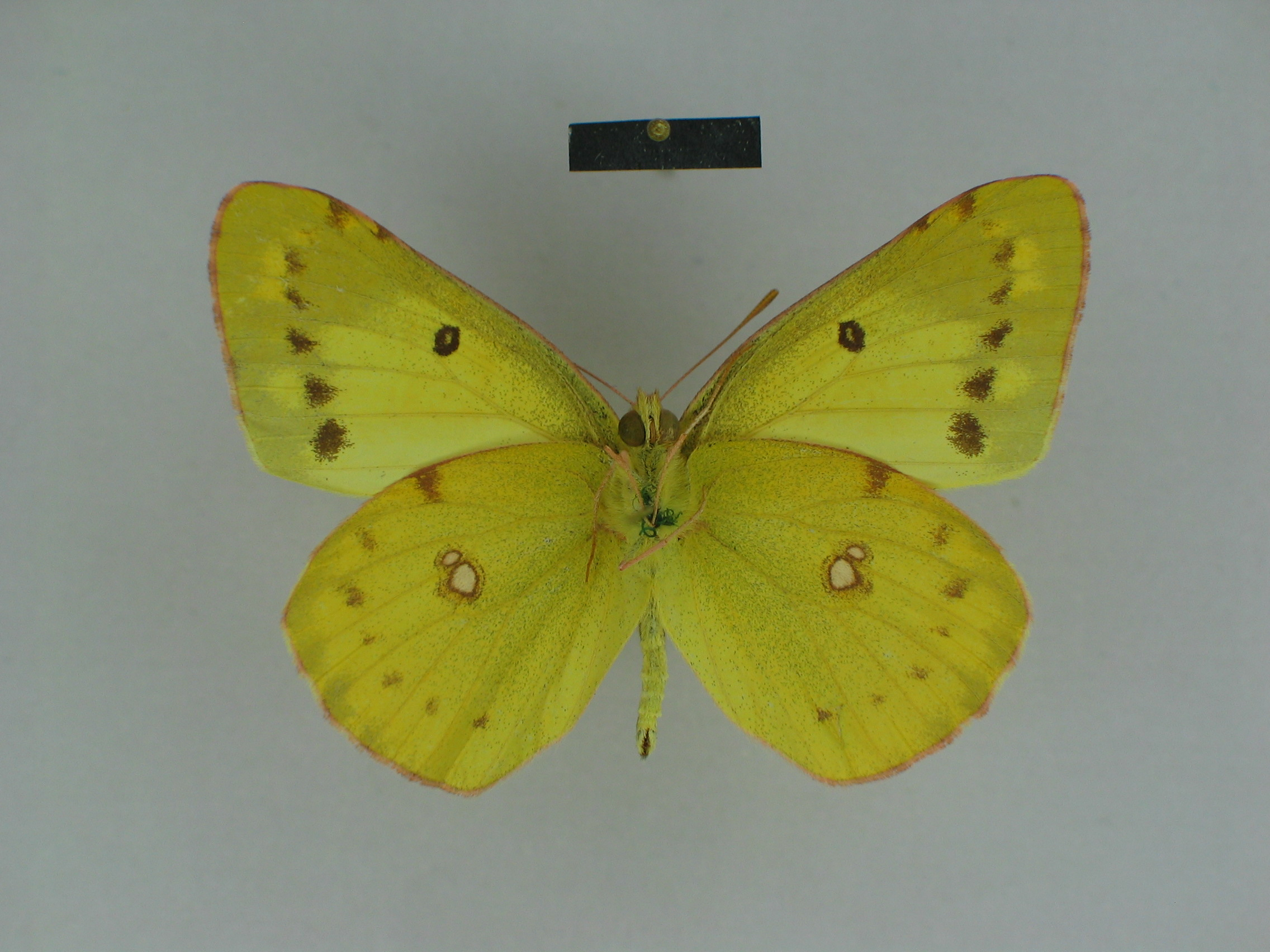
C. e. erate ventral view (male)

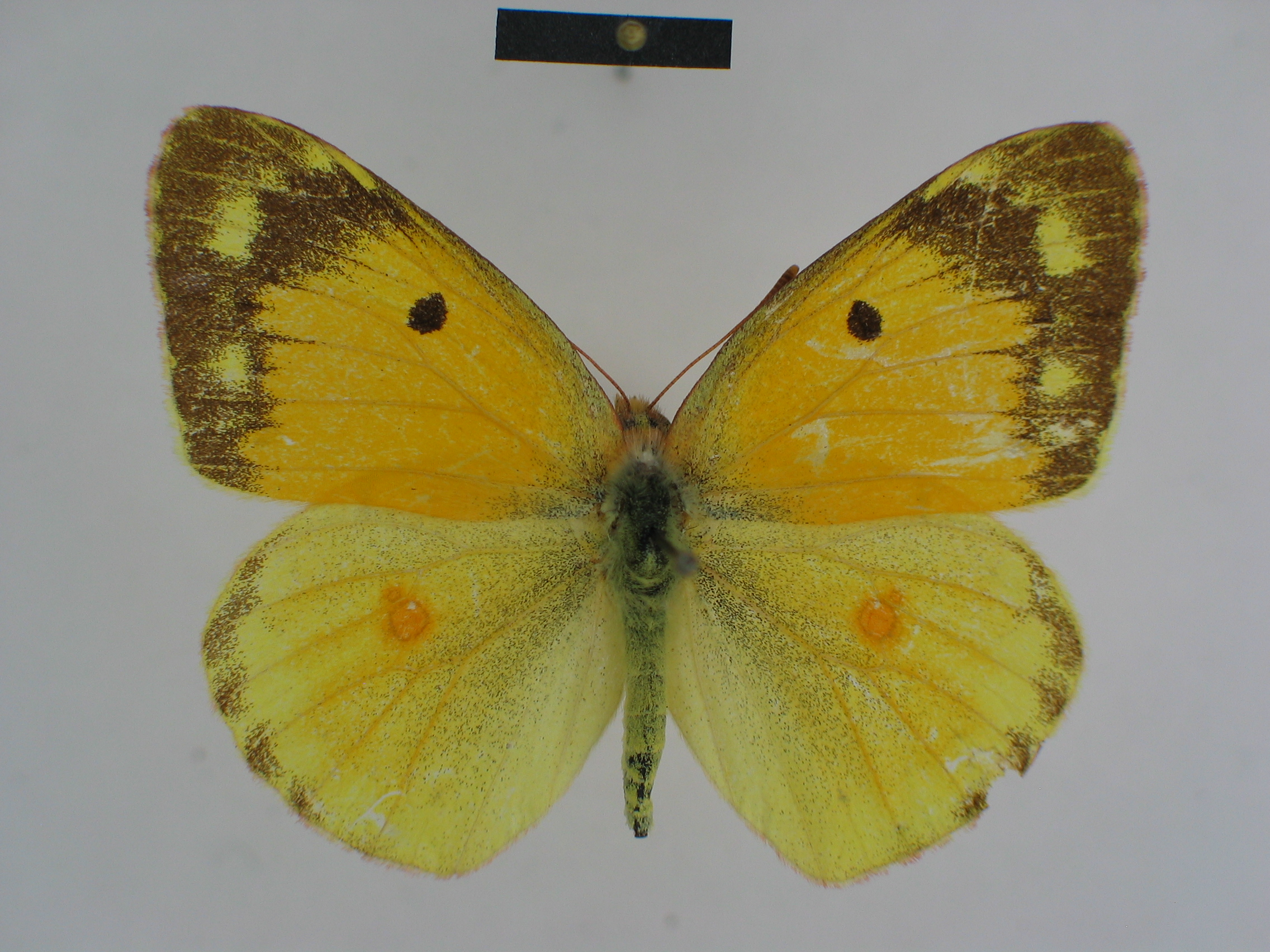
C. e. erate dorsal view (male)

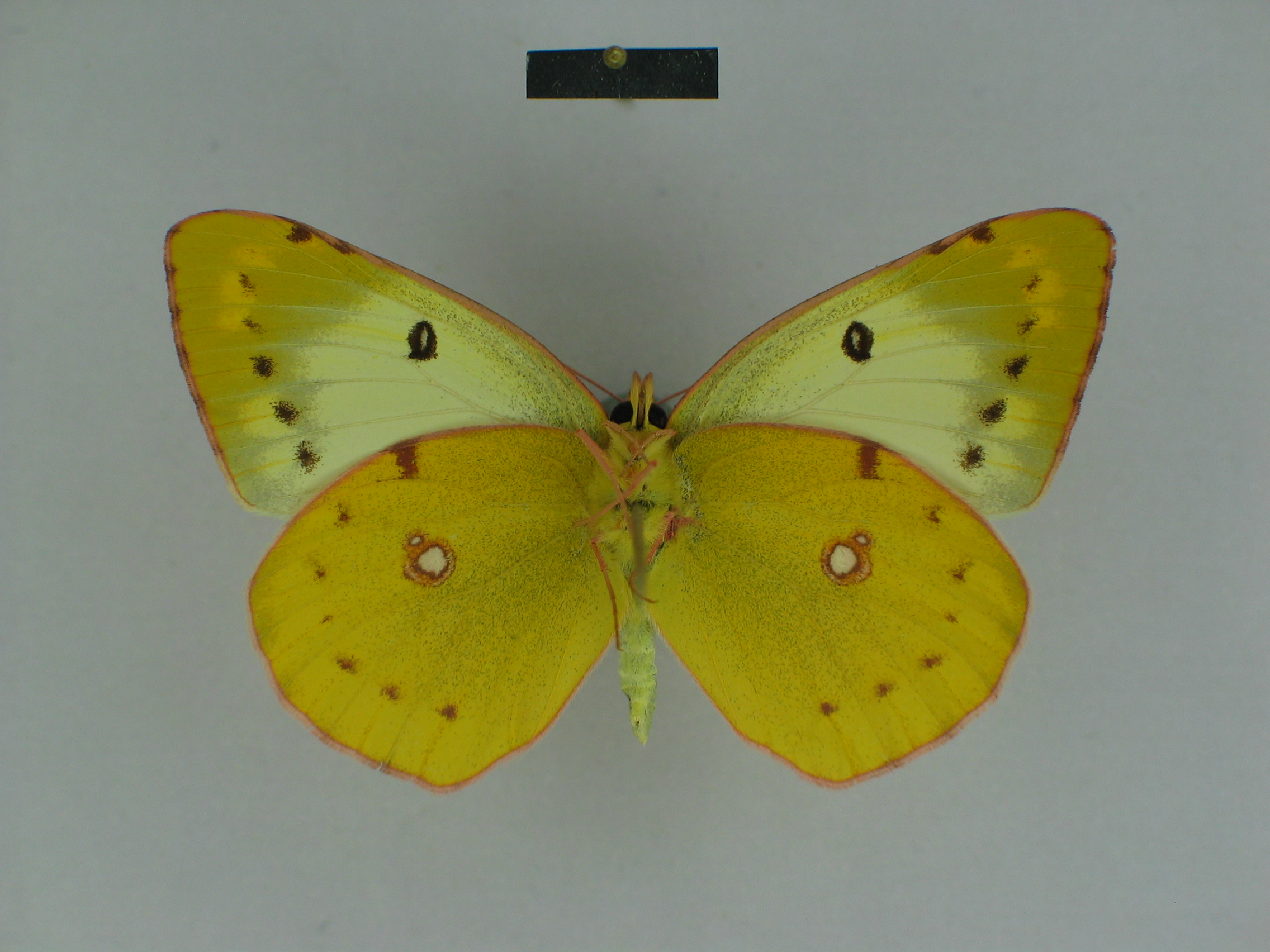
C. e. erate ventral view (female)

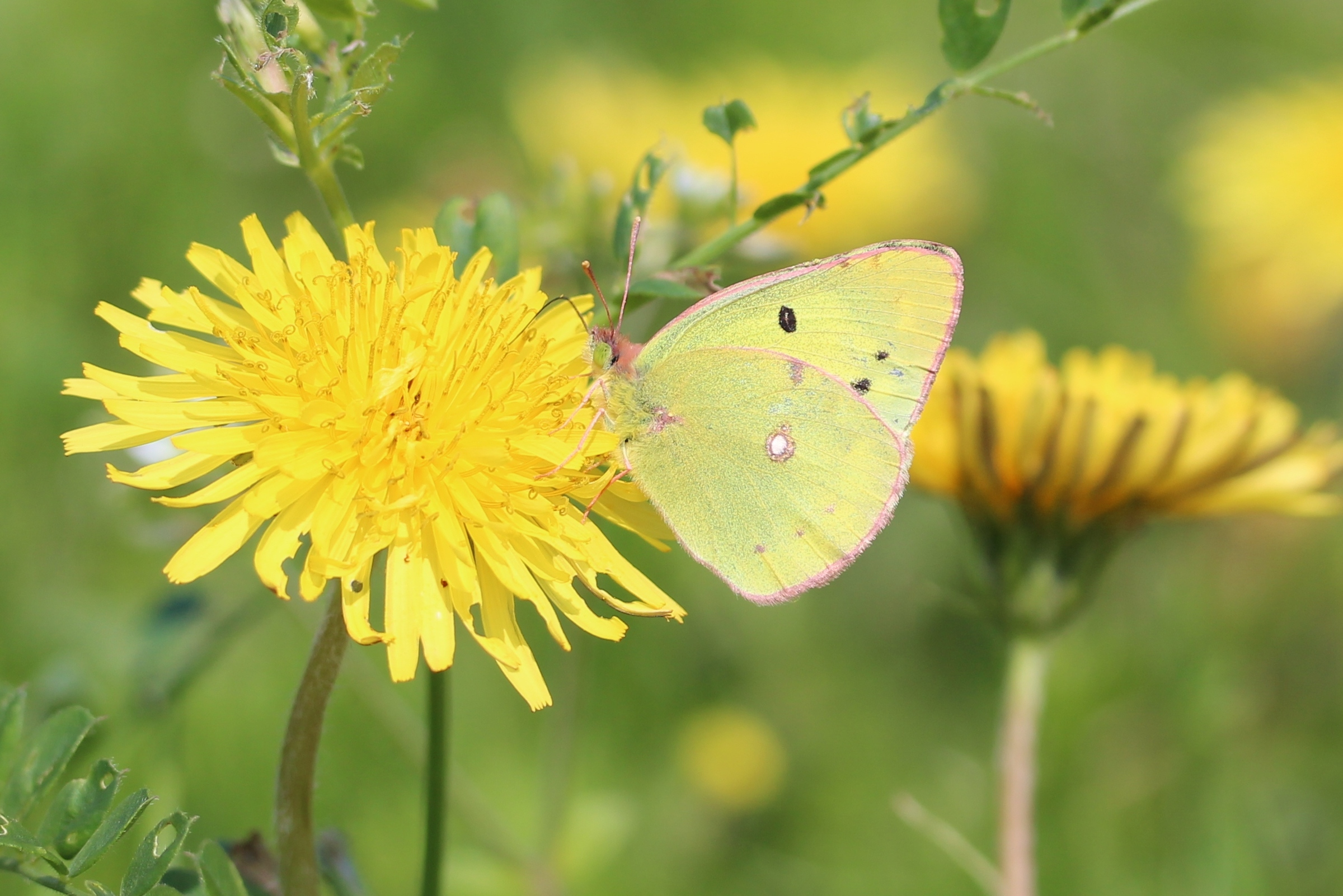
From Japan

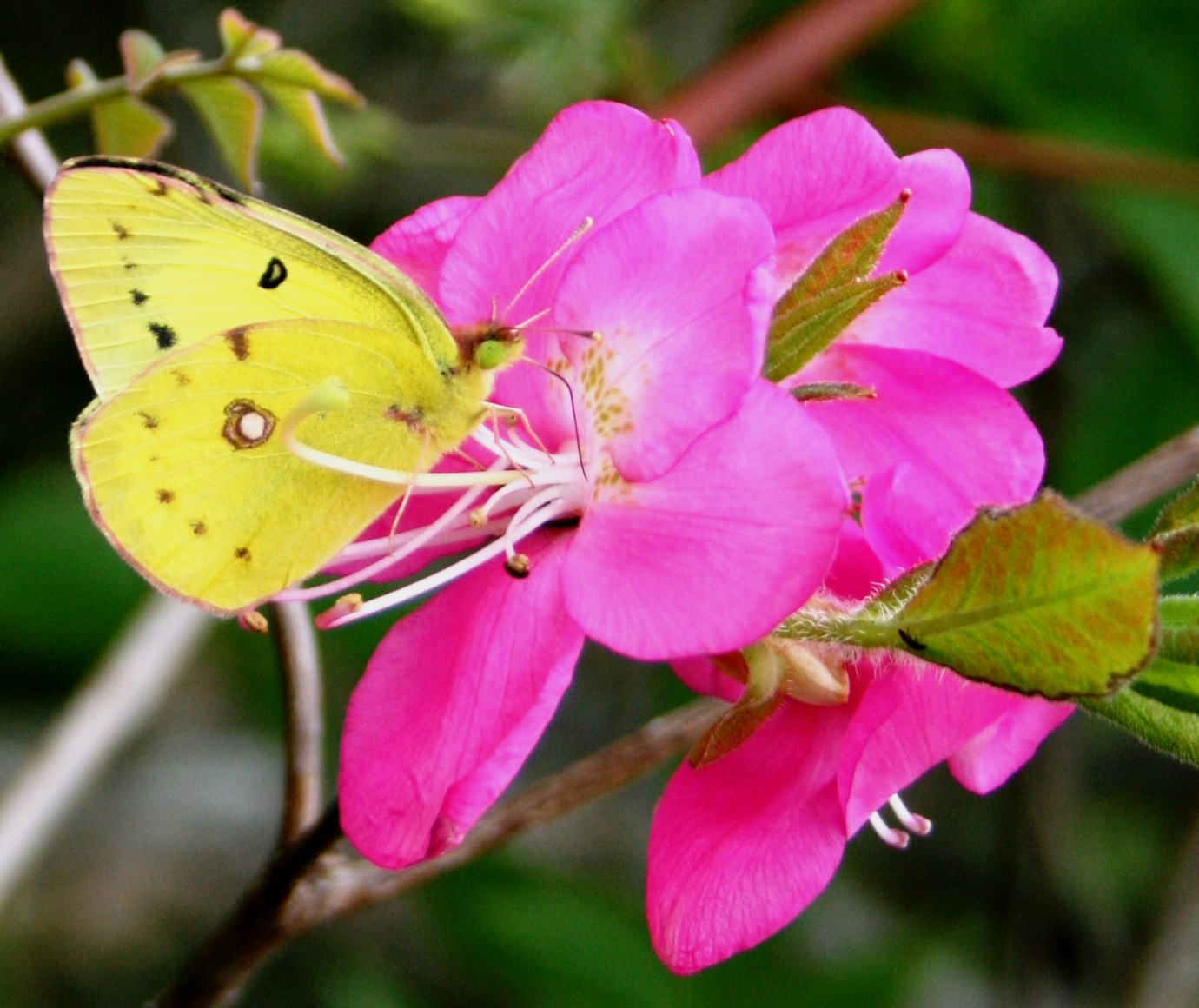
Feeding on nectar of Rhododendron albrechtii
