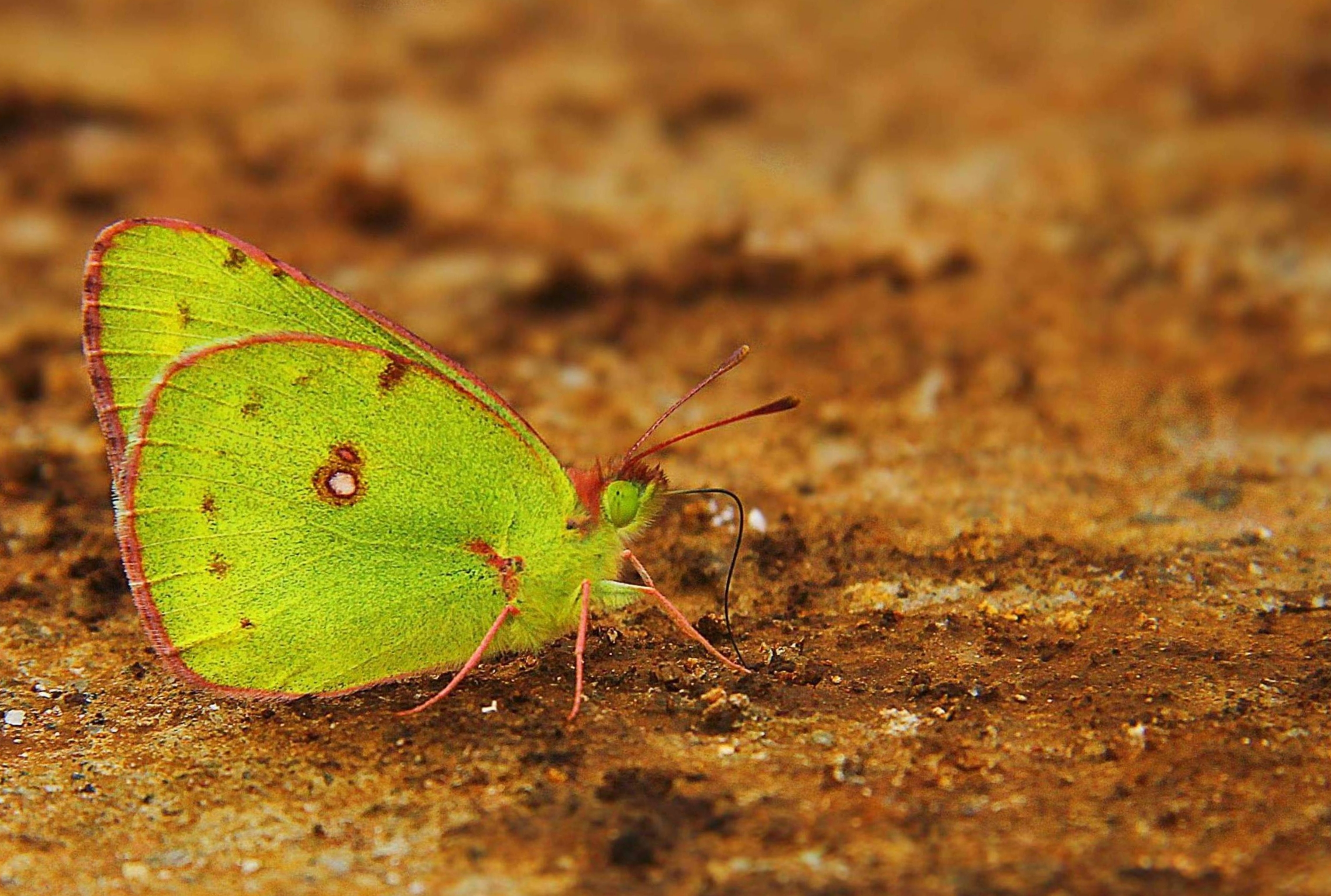

Scientific classification
- Kingdom: Animalia
- Phylum: Arthropoda
- Clade: Pancrustacea
- Class: Insecta
- Order: Lepidoptera
- Family: Pieridae
- Genus: Colias
- Species: C. nilagiriensis

Binomial name
- Colias nilagiriensis C. & R. Felder, 1859
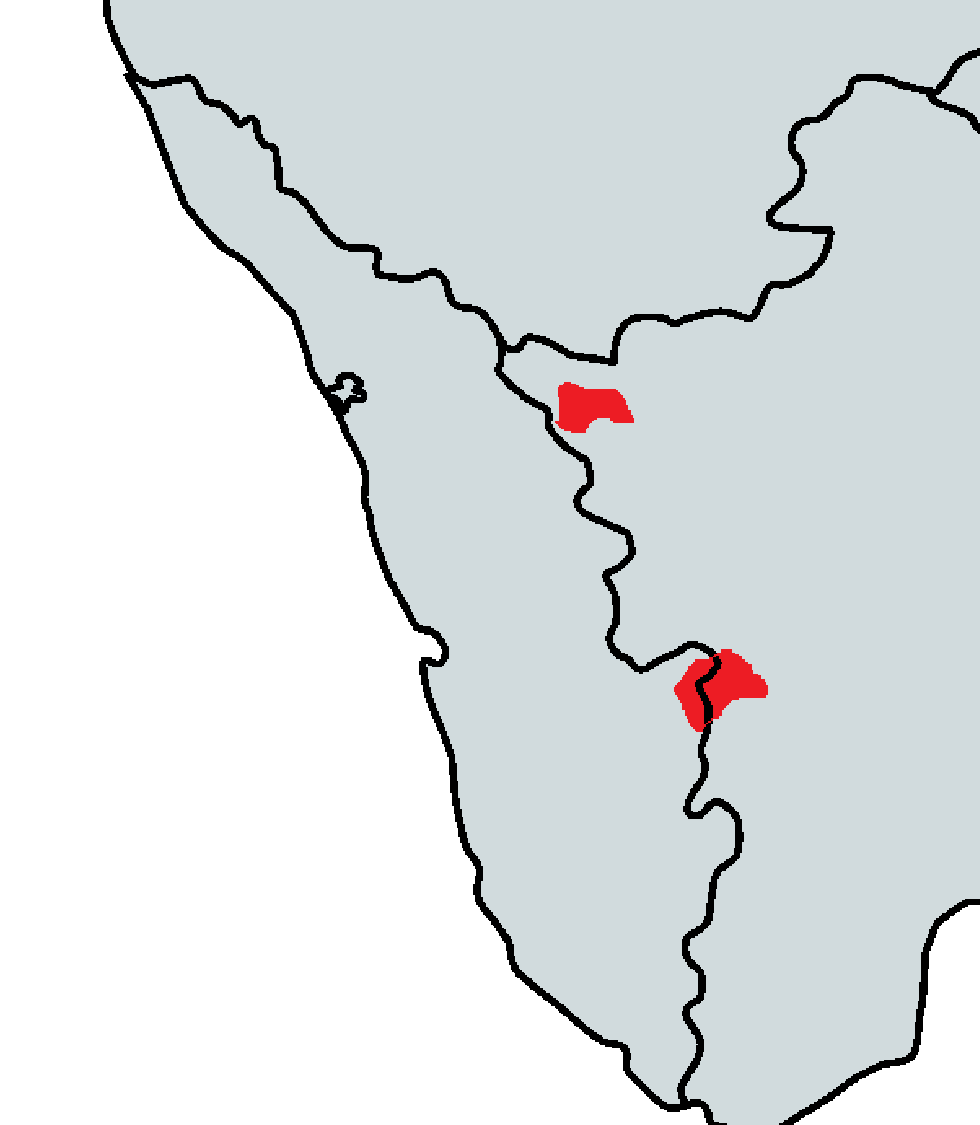

Synonyms
- Colias nilgiriensis (lapsus)

= Nilgiri clouded yellow =

Species of butterfly

The Nilgiri clouded yellow, Colias nilagiriensis, sometimes considered a subspecies of Colias erate, is a small butterfly native to Shola forests of the Western Ghats. It belongs to the family Pieridae.

Some authors treat this as a subspecies of the eastern pale clouded yellow (C. erate) while others consider it on the basis of its geographic isolatation as a phylogenetically distinct species Colias nilagiriensis.

== Description ==
Charles Thomas Bingham (1907) gives a detailed description:

Race nilgiriensis, Felder. Closely resembles typical hyale, but as it is isolated in the hills of Southern India it has acquired a distinguishable general appearance.

♂ Upperside : ground-colour a deeper, brighter yellow; irroration of black scales at base of fore wing much more extensive and on the hind wing spread right up to the black on terminal margin; terminal black border to both fore and hind wings proportionately broader; on the fore wing traversed as in the typical form by a transverse series of yellow spots. Underside : ground-colour a brighter yellow than in hyale, but somewhat densely overlaid along the costal margin, on apical area of fore wing and over the whole surface of the hind wing, with a dusting of black scales that gives the underside of the wings a decidedly green tinge. Antennae, head, thorax and abdomen as in hi/ale, but the latter two somewhat darker on the upperside.

♀ Upperside: ground-colour apparently always white, but so very densely overlaid on the basal third of the fore and over the whole surface of the hind wing with irrorations of black scales, that the insect has a very distinctive appearance when compared with the white dimorphic ♀ of hyale black borders to both wings as in hyale, but traversed on the fore wing by only two white spots and on both wings proportionately broader. Underside : fore wing white, apex broadly greenish yellow; disco-cellular and postdiscal spots as in hyale. Hind wing : greenish yellow, spots and markings much as in hyale. Both sexes always run strikingly smaller than they do in the typical form.

Exp. ♂,♀ 44-48 mm. (1.74-1.88").

Hab. Southern India : the Nilgiri and Palani Hills and Travancore, at 5000 feet.

— Charles Thomas Bingham

It is found in Shola forests, which are subtropical rainforests in the valleys of tall meadows in the Western Ghats. Therefore, it has a range from Kudremukha in central Karnataka, to Coorg, Wayanad, Nilgiris, and down to Silent Valley National Park, to the Anamalais. It is also found in the Periyar National Park, where it is found in the Sholas around Kakki Reservoir, and down to the Pothigai and Ponmudi.

== Life history ==
The larvae feed on Parochetus communis and Trifolium.

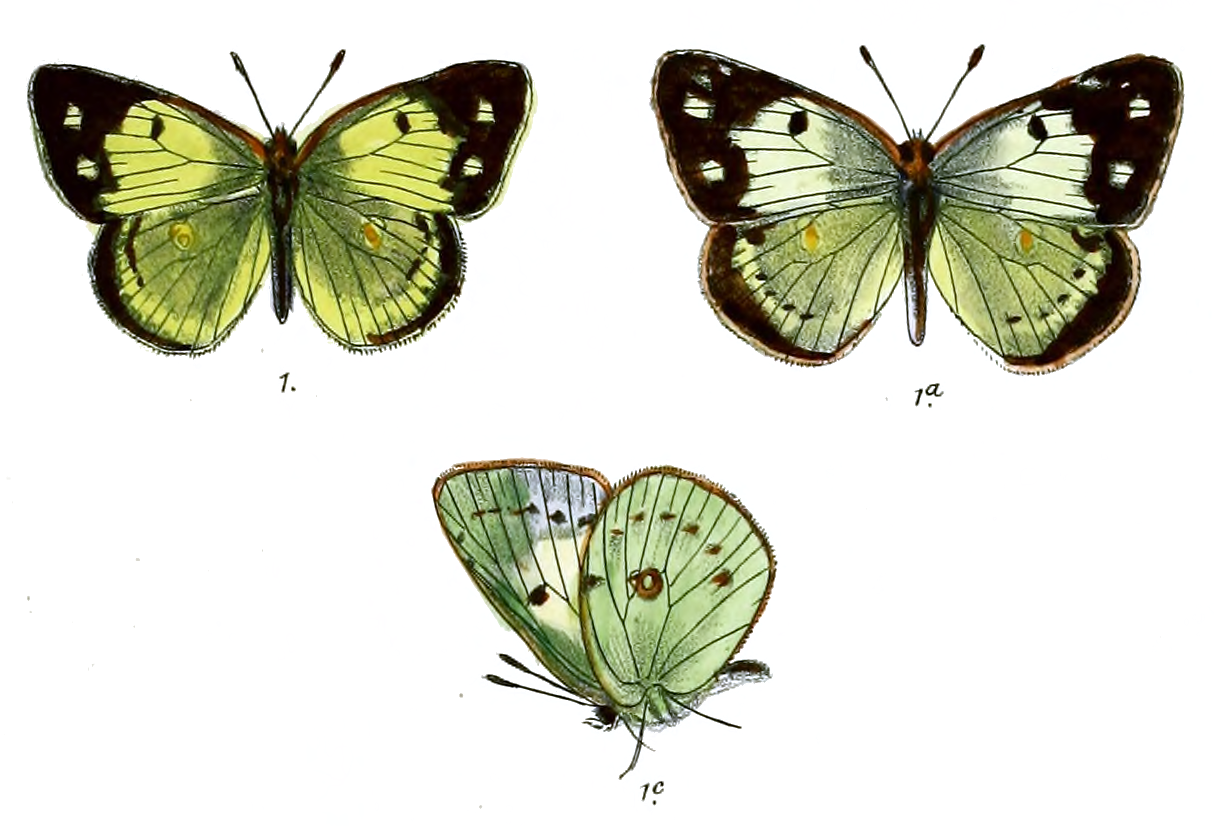
Illustration

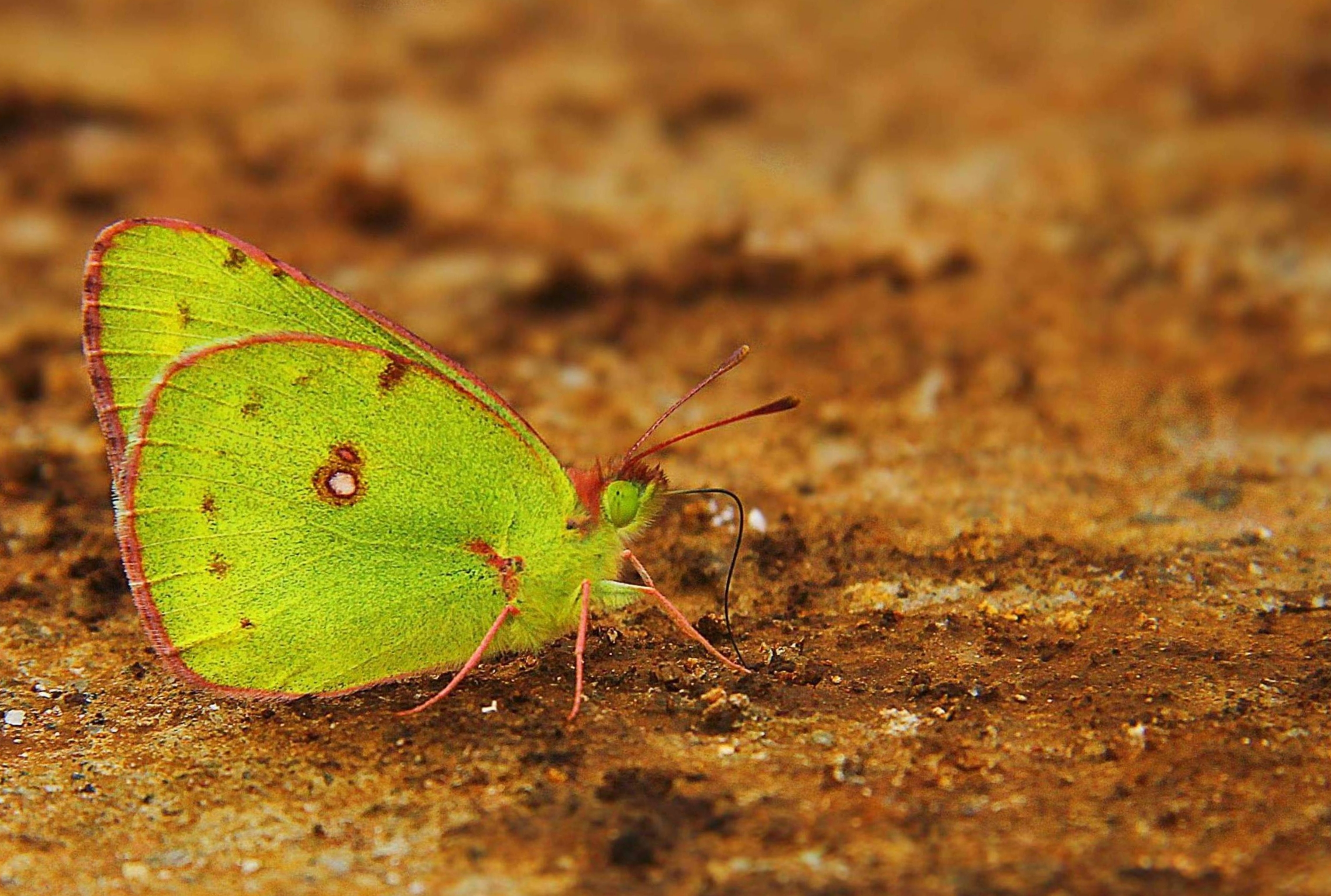
Ventral view (male)

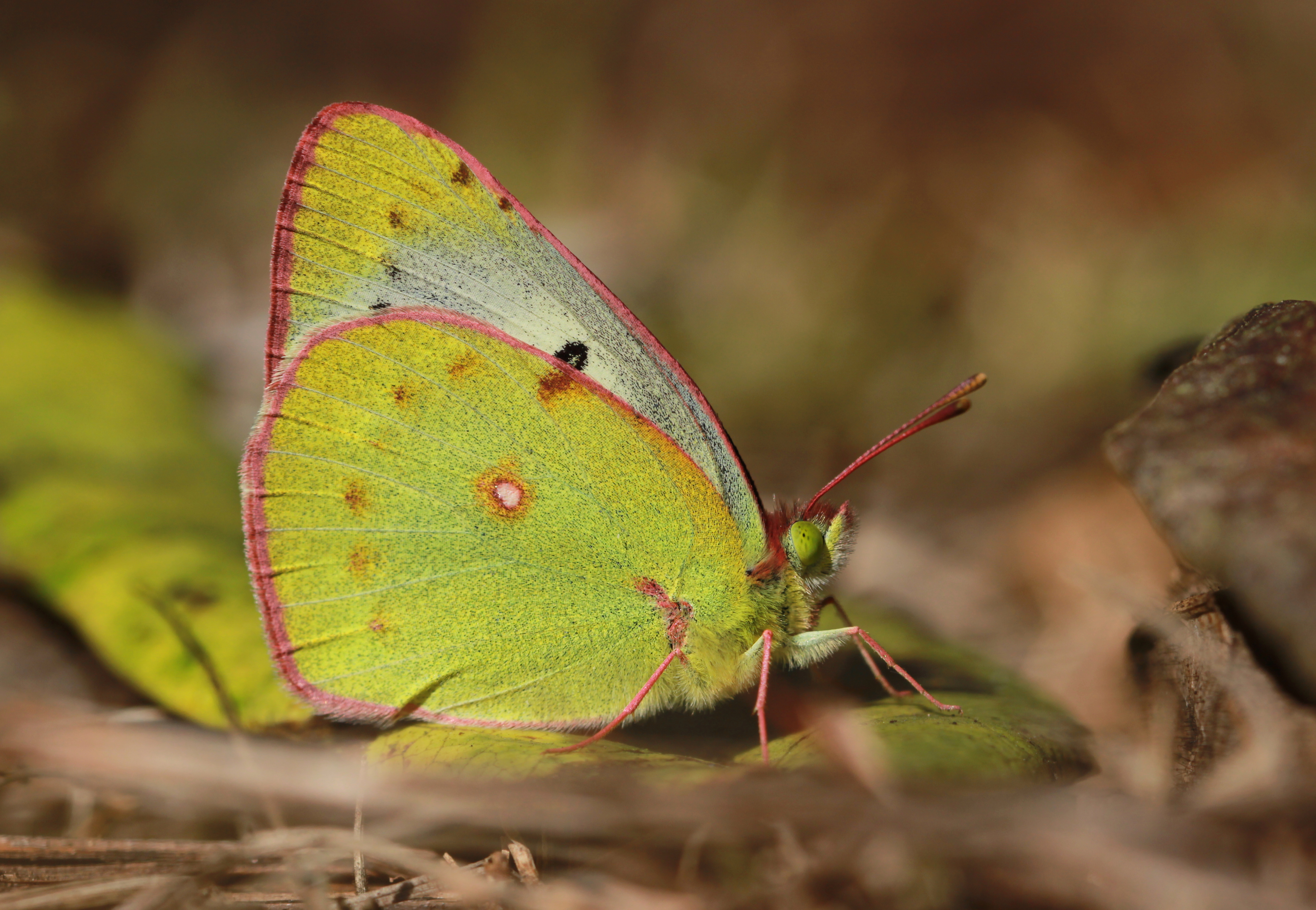
Ventral view (female)

== See also ==
- List of butterflies of India (Pieridae)

== Other references ==
- Evans, W.H. (1932). The Identification of Indian Butterflies (2nd ed.). Mumbai, India: Bombay Natural History Society.
- Gaonkar, Harish (1996). Butterflies of the Western Ghats, India (including Sri Lanka) - A Biodiversity Assessment of a Threatened Mountain System. Bangalore, India: Centre for Ecological Sciences.
- Gay, Thomas; Kehimkar, Isaac David; Punetha, Jagdish Chandra (1992). Common Butterflies of India. Nature Guides. Bombay, India: World Wide Fund for Nature-India by Oxford University Press. ISBN 978-0195631647.
- Kunte, Krushnamegh (2000). Butterflies of Peninsular India. India, A Lifescape. Hyderabad, India: Universities Press. ISBN 978-8173713545.
- Wynter-Blyth, Mark Alexander (1957). Butterflies of the Indian Region. Bombay, India: Bombay Natural History Society. ISBN 978-8170192329.
