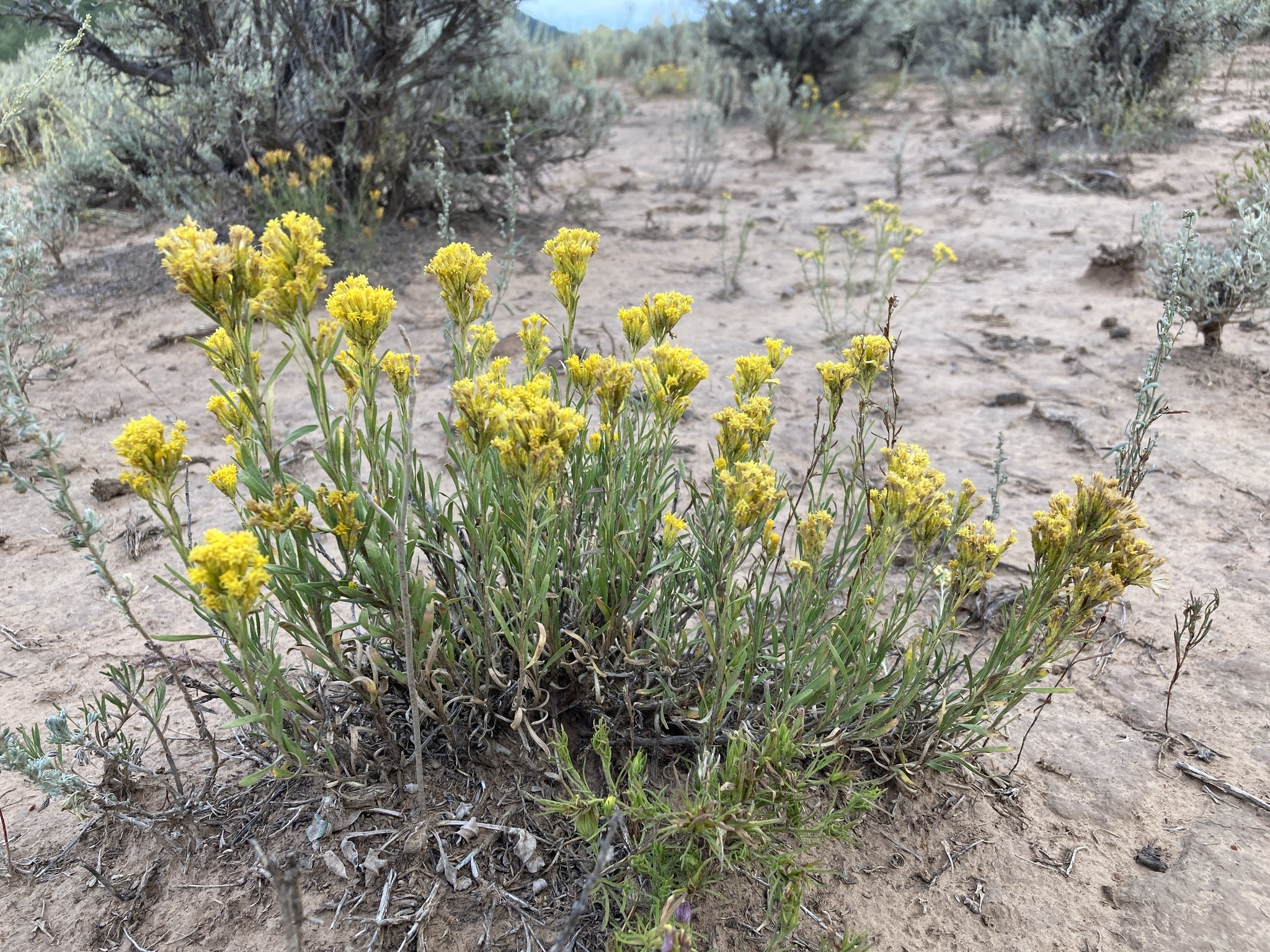

Conservation status
- Secure (NatureServe)

Scientific classification
- Kingdom: Plantae
- Clade: Tracheophytes
- Clade: Angiosperms
- Clade: Eudicots
- Clade: Asterids
- Order: Asterales
- Family: Asteraceae
- Genus: Chrysothamnus
- Species: C. vaseyi

Binomial name
- Chrysothamnus vaseyi (A.Gray) Greene

Synonyms
- Homotypic synonyms: Aster vaseyi (A.Gray) Kuntze; Bigelowia vaseyi A.Gray; Ericameria vaseyi (A.Gray) L.C.Anderson; Heterotypic synonyms: Chrysothamnus bakeri Greene

= Chrysothamnus vaseyi =

Species of flowering plant

Chrysothamnus vaseyi is a species of flowering plant in tribe Astereae in the daisy family Asteraceae. It is native to the Southwestern United States. The specific epithet vaseyi honors the American botanist George Vasey. The species is commonly called Vasey's rabbitbrush.

== Description ==
Chrysothamnus vaseyi is a branching shrub up to 30 cm (12 inches) tall with tan or gray bark, becoming flaky as it gets old. It has many small, yellow flower heads clumped into dense arrays.

== Taxonomy ==
Chrysothamnus vaseyi was first described as Bigelowia vaseyi by the American botanist Asa Gray in 1876. The type specimen was collected by George Vasey at Middle Park in the Rocky Mountains of Colorado in 1868. The American botanist Edward Lee Greene placed Bigelowia vaseyi in genus Chrysothamnus in 1895. As of January 2025, Chrysothamnus vaseyi (A.Gray) Greene is a widely accepted name.

== Distribution and habitat ==
Chrysothamnus vaseyi has been found in Utah, Colorado, northern New Mexico, southern Wyoming, northern Arizona (Navajo County) and eastern Nevada (White Pine County). It grows in open woodlands alongside pine and oak.

== Bibliography ==
- Gray, Asa (1876). "Contributions to the botany of North America". Proceedings of the American Academy of Arts and Sciences. 12: 51–84.
