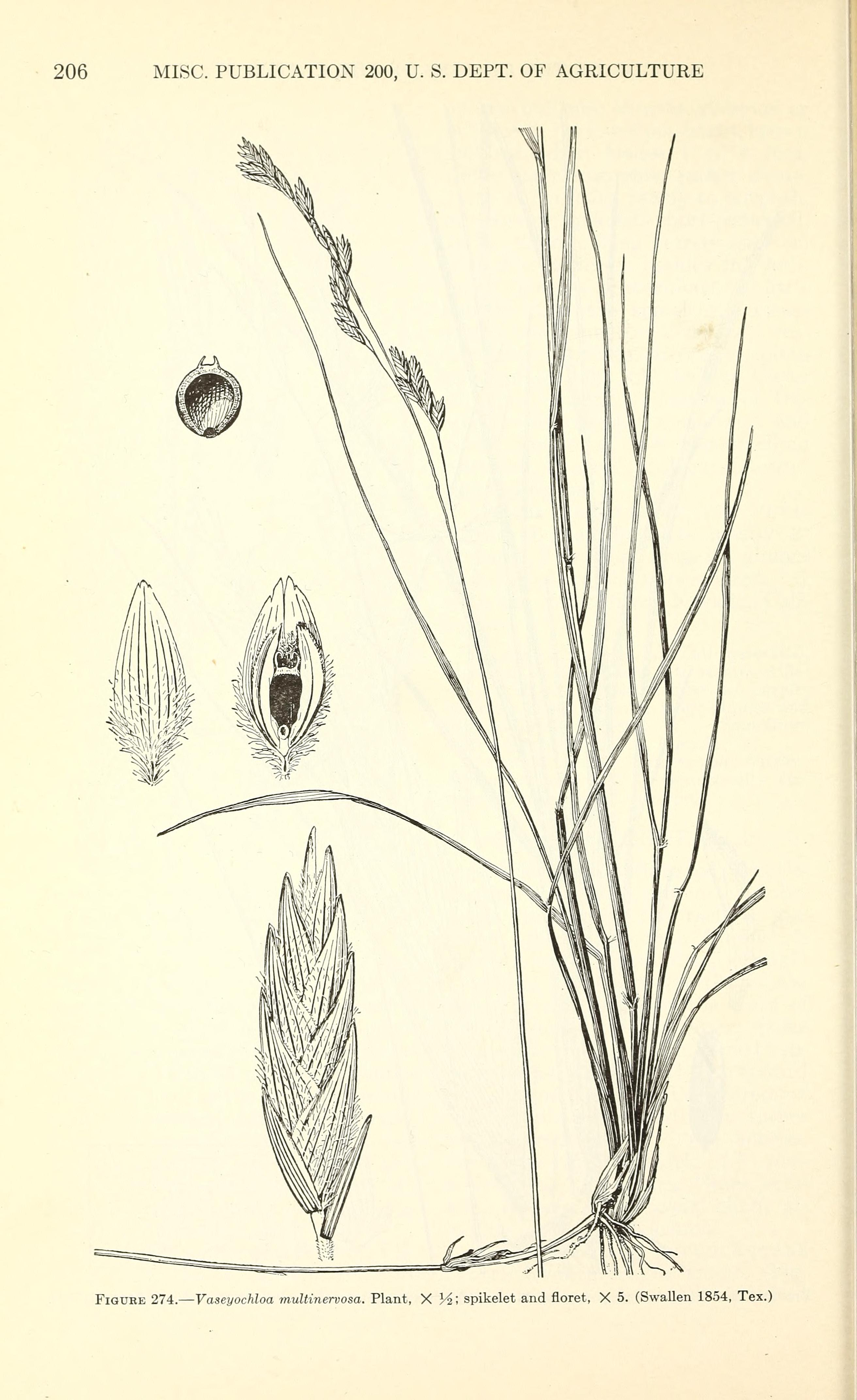
- Vaseyochloa multinervosa

Scientific classification
- Kingdom: Plantae
- Clade: Tracheophytes
- Clade: Angiosperms
- Clade: Monocots
- Clade: Commelinids
- Order: Poales
- Family: Poaceae
- Subfamily: Chloridoideae
- Tribe: Cynodonteae
- Subtribe: Gouiniinae
- Genus: Vaseyochloa; Hitchc.
- Species: V. multinervosa

Binomial name
- Vaseyochloa multinervosa (Vasey) Hitchc.

Synonyms
- Homotypic synonyms: Distichlis multinervosa (Vasey) Piper; Melica multinervosa Vasey; Triodia multinervosa (Vasey) Hitchc.

= Vaseyochloa =

Genus of flowering plants

Vaseyochloa is a monotypic genus in the grass family Poaceae. Its sole species, the flowering plant Vaseyochloa multinervosa, is endemic to Texas. It is commonly known as Texasgrass.

== Taxonomy ==
Vaseyochloa was named and described by the American botanist Albert Spear Hitchcock in 1933. The generic name honors the American botanist George Vasey who named and described the type species Melica multinervosa in 1891. As of January 2025, Vaseyochloa multinervosa (Vasey) Hitchc. is a widely accepted name.

== Distribution and habitat ==
Vaseyochloa multinervosa is endemic to southern and south-central Texas.

== Bibliography ==
- Hitchcock, A. S. (1933). "New species and new names of grasses from Texas". Journal of the Washington Academy of Sciences. 23 (10): 449–456.
- Hitchcock, A. S.; Chase, Agnes (1951). Manual of the Grasses of the United States (2nd ed.). Washington, D.C.: United States Deptartment of Agriculture.
