= George Richard Vasey =

American botanical collector (1853–1921)

- Born: 1853; Illinois, United States
- Died: 1921 (aged 67–68); Alberta, Canada
- Other names: G. R. Vasey
- Occupation: Botanical collector
- Years active: 1875–1901
- Employer: USDA
- Known for: Collected thousands of plant specimens in CA, NC, and WA
- Father: George Vasey
- Relatives: Flora Nancy Vasey (sister)

George Richard Vasey (1853–1921) was an American botanical collector who collected in at least nine U.S. states including California, North Carolina, and Washington. His specimens are labeled with the name G. R. Vasey. Based on the number of his specimens described as new species, the historian Joseph Ewan remarked "he must have had a hawk eye for plant prey". He was the son of Dr. George Vasey, a physician and botanist. The botanical activities of father and son overlapped in time, so the two men are often confused.

== Life ==
Based on United States census data, George Richard Vasey was born in McHenry County, Illinois circa 1852–1853. During the 1900 United States census in Whitman County, Washington, Vasey reported he was born in Illinois in August 1853. The precise date and place of his birth are unknown.

George R. Vasey was the son of Dr. George Vasey and Martha Jane Scott. Following their marriage in 1846, his parents settled in Dexter, New York but by the time Vasey was born, the family lived in Ringwood, Illinois where his father practiced medicine. His mother died when he was about 13 years old. He had six siblings, one of whom died as an infant. Both he and his sister, Flora Nancy Vasey, became botanical collectors.

George R. Vasey lived in the state of Washington for more than 20 years. In 1882, when Washington was still a territory, he bought some land near Steptoe, which is approximately 40 miles south of what is now Spokane. During the United States census of 1900, Vasey declared himself to be a farmer.

George R. Vasey left Washington around 1905 to homestead in Canada. He died in Donalda, Alberta on 23 May 1921.

== Collections ==
George Richard Vasey collected thousands of plant specimens from 1875 to 1901. He made significant plant collections in Northern California in 1875, in the Southeastern United States in 1878, in the Southwestern United States (including Southern California) in 1881, and in central Washington in 1889. Based on the number of specimens subsequently described as new species, "he must have had a hawk eye for plant prey". His specimens are preserved at numerous herbaria but the bulk of them are held by the United States National Herbarium (US), the New York Botanical Garden (NY), and the Harvard University Herbaria (HUH). Most of them are labeled with the collector name "G. R. Vasey" but a few bear other names such as "Geo. R. Vasey" and "Vasey Jr." For comparison, collector names used by his father Dr. George Vasey include "G. Vasey", "Geo. Vasey", and "Dr. Geo. Vasey".

Many of G. R. Vasey's specimens were sent to his father, who at the time was curator of the United States National Herbarium (US). Most of the specimens at US are labeled in his father's handwriting, usually with the year the specimen was collected and the U.S. state where the specimen was taken. In many cases, no other locality data are given. It is thought that either the specimens were sent to his father without labels or his father rewrote the labels attached to the specimens.

G. R. Vasey collected in at least nine U.S. states:

- 1875–1876: California
- 1878: North Carolina, Tennessee, Alabama, Georgia
- 1880–1881: California, Arizona, Texas, New Mexico
- 1883, 1888–1889, 1900–1901: Washington

During 1875–1876, G. R. Vasey collected hundreds of specimens in Northern California, in the vicinity of San Francisco and northward into Mendocino County. The American botanist Sereno Watson cited more than a dozen of Vasey's specimens in the Botany of California published in 1880.

G. R. Vasey collected hundreds of specimens in the southern Appalachian Mountains in 1878, "to be sold in sets of 600 species for $50 a set". Based on the herbarium record, he visited North Carolina, Tennessee, Alabama, and Georgia, in that order. At the same time he was collecting in the southern Appalachians, his father George Vasey was collecting in Maryland, Virginia, and Washington, D.C. Many of the plants collected by his father in 1878 have been misattributed to G. R. Vasey (and vice-versa).

Based on herbarium records, G. R. Vasey collected thousands of plant specimens in the Southwestern United States in 1880 and 1881. In 1880, he studied the trees of California for the Forestry Report of the Tenth Census published in 1884. There are dozens of references to G. R. Vasey in that report. In 1881, he collected hundreds of specimens in Southern California, Arizona, Texas, and New Mexico, in that order. During the summer of that year, he visited the Sangre de Cristo Mountains west of Las Vegas, New Mexico and the Organ Mountains east of Las Cruces, New Mexico. G. R. Vasey is said to have collected dozens of specimens in Texas between 1881 and 1888, but there is no conclusive evidence he was in Texas after 1881.

In 1883, G. R. Vasey collected more than 100 specimens in the Washington Territory, now known as the U.S. state of Washington. In 1989, the year Washington rose to statehood, he collected extensively in central Washington, in what are now Yakima, Kittitas, and King counties. Although many of his specimens lacked adequate locality data, there are scores of references to those specimens in the Flora of the state of Washington published in 1906. The American botanist Charles Vancouver Piper compiled a taxonomic summary of Vasey's specimens in 1936. Finally, Vasey collected some specimens near his home in Steptoe, Washington during 1900–1901. This marked the end of G. R. Vasey's career as a botanical collector.

== Legacy ==
There are dozens of eponymous taxon names that include an epithet such as vaseyi, vaseyanus, vaseyana, or vaseyanum. Some of these names honor George R. Vasey but some of them acknowledge his father, Dr. George Vasey, a botanist who began collecting plants as a teenager growing up in Oneida County, New York. Notable examples of names that recognize the younger Vasey include Rhododendron vaseyi, Trillium vaseyi, Artemisia vaseyana, and Cirsium hydrophilum var. vaseyi.

The American botanist Asa Gray named and described Rhododendron vaseyi in 1880. In his description, Gray included the following anecdote:

As this interesting accession to our flora is one of the fruits of a botanical tour recently made by Mr. George R. Vasey, son of Dr. Vasey, the botanist of the Agricultural Department, who recognized its novelty and placed a specimen in my hands, I seize the opportunity of commemorating the name of Vasey in connection with the noble genus Rhododendron.

George R. Vasey collected the type specimen of Rhododendron vaseyi A.Gray in Jackson County, North Carolina in 1878. The species is sometimes referred to as the Vasey Rhododendron.

The species Trillium vaseyi was named and described by the American botanist Thomas Grant Harbison in 1901. In his description, Harbison claimed that "this Trillium was collected in the mountains of North Carolina in 1878 by Dr. George Vasey, whose name I take pleasure in associating with this species". However, the type specimen of Trillium vaseyi Harb. was in fact collected by George R. Vasey, not his father. The species is commonly known as Vasey's trillium.

The subspecies Artemisia tridentata subsp. vaseyana was first described as Artemisia vaseyana by the American botanist Per Axel Rydberg in 1916. The type specimen was collected by George R. Vasey in the state of Washington in 1889. As of December 2024, Artemisia vaseyana Rydb. is a homotypic synonym for Artemisia tridentata subsp. vaseyana (Rydb.) Beetle. The taxon is commonly called the Vasey sage.

The variety Cirsium hydrophilum var. vaseyi was first described as Cnicus breweri var. vaseyi by Asa Gray in 1884. The type specimen was collected by George R. Vasey on Mount Tamalpais in 1876. In his description of Cirsium hydrophilum var. vaseyi in 1959, the American botanist John Thomas Howell referred to the taxon as "the plant of Vasey's collecting", more commonly known as Vasey's thistle.

George Richard Vasey did not author any botanical names.

== Bibliography ==
- Brewer, William H. (1880). "List of persons who have made botanical collections in California". In Watson, Sereno (ed.). Botany of California, Vol. 2. Cambridge, Mass: John Wilson and Son. pp. 553–559.
- Ewan, Joseph; Ewan, Nesta Dunn (1981). Biographical dictionary of Rocky Mountain naturalists: a guide to the writings and collections of botanists, zoologists, geologists, artists and photographers, 1682–1932. Utrecht/Antwerpen: Bohn, Scheltema & Holkema. ISBN 90-313-0415-8.
- Floden, Aaron; Knapp, Wesley (June 2023). "Typification of the North American species of Trillium subg. Trillium (Melanthiaceae: Parideae)". Phytotaxa. 599 (3): 193–200. doi:10.11646/phytotaxa.599.3.6.
- Gray, Asa (1880). "Botanical contributions". Proceedings of the American Academy of Arts and Sciences. 15. Boston, Massachusetts: 25–52. doi:10.2307/25138561. JSTOR 25138561.
- Harbison, Thomas G. (1901). "New or little known species of Trillium". Biltmore Botanical Studies. 1 (1): 19–24.
- Howell, John Thomas (1959). "Studies in Cirsium II". Leaflets of Western Botany. 9. San Francisco, CA: 9–15.
- Piper, Charles V. (1906). "Flora of the state of Washington". Contributions from the United States National Herbarium. 11.
- Watson, Sereno, ed. (1880). Botany of California, Vol. 2. Geological Survey of California. Cambridge, Mass: John Wilson and Son.
