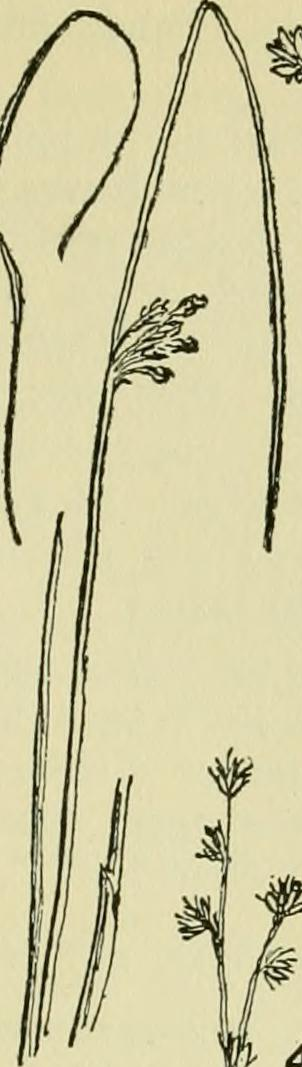

Conservation status
- Secure (NatureServe)

Scientific classification
- Kingdom: Plantae
- Clade: Tracheophytes
- Clade: Angiosperms
- Clade: Monocots
- Clade: Commelinids
- Order: Poales
- Family: Juncaceae
- Genus: Juncus
- Species: J. vaseyi

Binomial name
- Juncus vaseyi Engelm.

Synonyms
- Homotypic synonyms: Agathryon vaseyi (Engelm.) Záv.Drábk. & Proćków; Juncus greenei var. vaseyi (Engelm.) B.Boivin

= Juncus vaseyi =

Species of flowering plant

Juncus vaseyi is a species of flowering plant in the rush family Juncaceae. It is native to North America. The specific epithet vaseyi honors the American botanist George Vasey. The species is commonly called Vasey's rush.

== Taxonomy ==
Juncus vaseyi was named and described by the German-American botanist George Engelmann in 1866. The type specimen was collected a "few years" earlier by Dr. George Vasey along the Fox River near Ringwood, Illinois. Since Vasey had "paid a good deal of attention to this genus", Engelmann named the species in his honor.

== Distribution and habitat ==
Juncus vaseyi occurs across North America, primarily in Canada. In the United States, it is most common in Minnesota.

== Conservation ==
According to NatureServe, the global conservation status of Juncus vaseyi is secure (G5). In Illinois, where the type specimen was collected during the mid-19th century, the species is possibly extirpated (SH).

== Bibliography ==
- Engelmann, George (1868). "A revision of the North American species of the genus Juncus, with a description of new or imperfectly known species". Transactions of the Academy of Science of Saint Louis. 2: 424–498.
