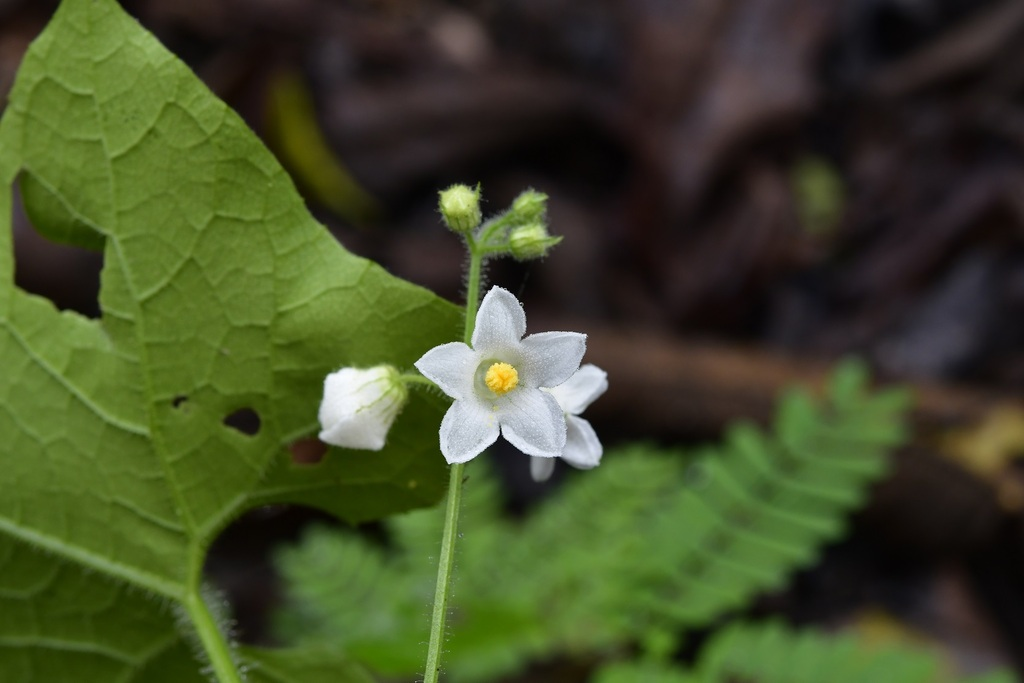

Scientific classification
- Kingdom: Plantae
- Clade: Tracheophytes
- Clade: Angiosperms
- Clade: Eudicots
- Clade: Rosids
- Order: Cucurbitales
- Family: Cucurbitaceae
- Genus: Echinopepon
- Species: E. racemosus

Binomial name
- Echinopepon racemosus (Steud.) C.Jeffrey

Synonyms
- List: Echinocystis araneosa Griseb.; Echinocystis lanata Cogn.; Echinocystis macrocarpa Britton; Echinocystis muricata Cogn.; Echinocystis polycarpa Cogn.; Echinocystis racemosa (Steud.) Mart.Crov.; Echinopepon horridus Naudin; Echinopepon lanatus (Cogn.) Rose; Marah rusbyi (Greene) Greene; Micrampelis araneosa (Griseb.) Kuntze; Micrampelis lanata (Cogn.) Kuntze; Micrampelis macrocarpa Rusby; Micrampelis polycarpa (Cogn.) Kuntze; Micrampelis rusbyi Greene; Momordica muricata Vell.; Momordica racemosa Steud.

= Echinopepon racemosus =

Species of plant in the genus Echinopepon

Echinopepon racemosus is a species of flowering plant in the genus Echinopepon, native to Latin America. A vine, its densely echinate fruits are dehiscent, but not explosive.
