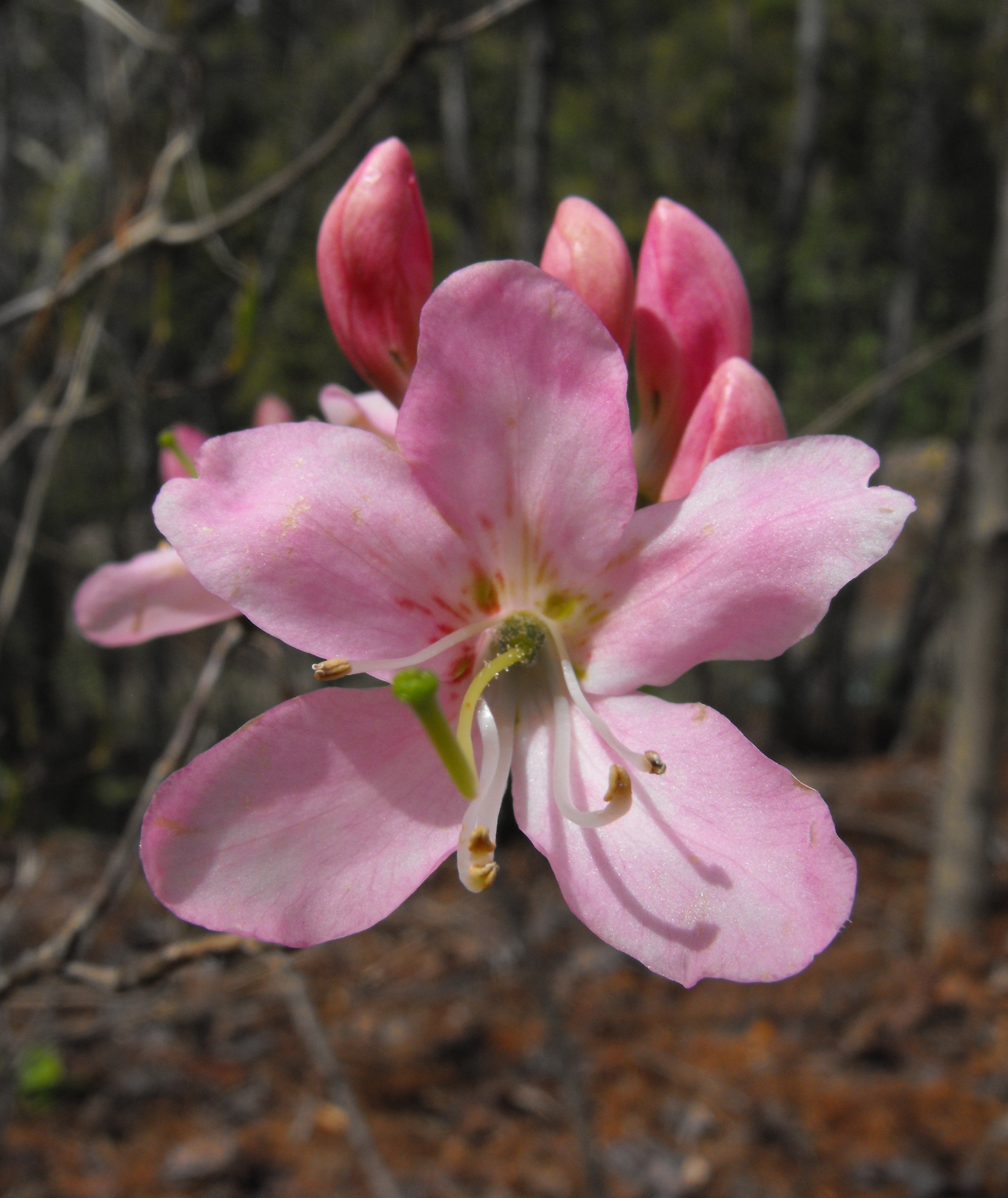

Conservation status
- Least Concern (IUCN 3.1)

- Vulnerable (NatureServe)

Scientific classification
- Kingdom: Plantae
- Clade: Tracheophytes
- Clade: Angiosperms
- Clade: Eudicots
- Clade: Asterids
- Order: Ericales
- Family: Ericaceae
- Genus: Rhododendron
- Species: R. vaseyi

Binomial name
- Rhododendron vaseyi A.Gray

Synonyms
- Azalea vaseyi (A.Gray) Rehder; Biltia vaseyi (A.Gray) Small

= Rhododendron vaseyi =

Species of flowering plant

Rhododendron vaseyi, the pinkshell azalea, is a species of flowering plant in the heath family Ericaceae. It is endemic to the Appalachian highlands of North Carolina. The specific epithet vaseyi honors the American plant collector George Richard Vasey and his father Dr. George Vasey, Chief Botanist at the United States Department of Agriculture from 1872 to 1893. The species is sometimes referred to as the Vasey Rhododendron.

== Description ==
Rhododendron vaseyi is a deciduous shrub that grows up to 5 metres (16 ft) in height. The large flowers are pink and begin to bloom in April.

== Taxonomy ==
Rhododendron vaseyi was named and described by the American botanist Asa Gray in 1880. The type specimen was collected in 1878 by George Richard Vasey, son of botanist George Vasey. Gray named the species in honor of both son and father.

== Distribution and habitat ==
Rhododendron vaseyi is endemic to the Appalachian highlands of North Carolina in widely scattered locations. While there is a main center of distribution west of Asheville, there is also a large population on Grandfather Mountain, in the northwestern corner of the state.

In the wild, this species grows in acidic moist and wet substrates near bogs and streams. It may occur alongside other types of Rhododendron, such as Rhododendron maximum. The understory is made up of many ericaceous species, such as Vaccinium spp. and Leucothoe fontanesiana. The plant can often be found in areas of the forest that have been recently cleared by logging operations.

== Conservation ==
Threats to Rhododendron vaseyi in the wild include destruction of habitat as land is converted to residential use, and poaching.

== Bibliography ==
- Gray, Asa (1880). "Botanical contributions". Proceedings of the American Academy of Arts and Sciences. 15. Boston, Massachusetts: 25–52. doi:10.2307/25138561. JSTOR 25138561.
