= The Rhodora =

Poem written by Ralph Waldo Emerson

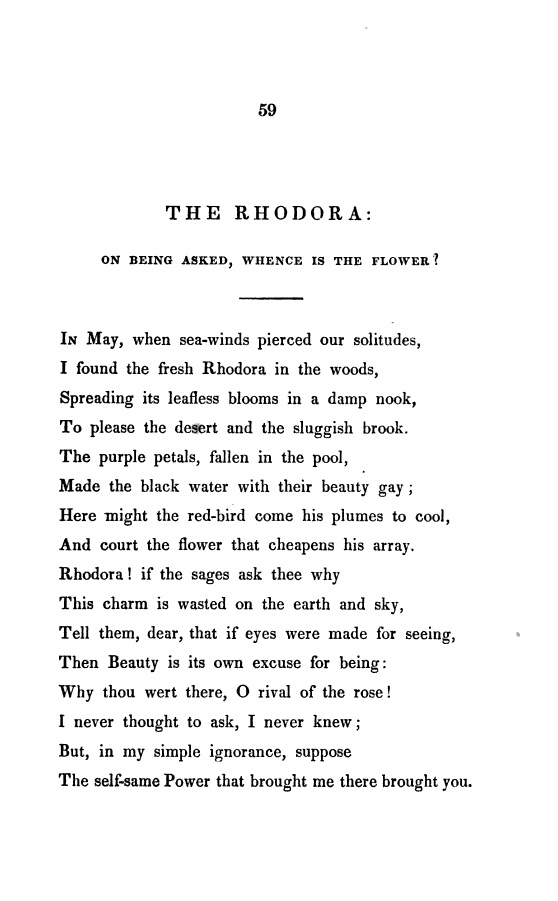
"The Rhodora" as it appeared in Poems (1847)

"The Rhodora, On Being Asked, Whence Is the Flower", or simply "The Rhodora", is an 1834 poem by American writer Ralph Waldo Emerson, a 19th century philosopher. The poem is about the rhodora, a common flowering shrub, and the beauty of this shrub in its natural setting.

== Composition and structure ==
Emerson had begun a new journal with his poetic jottings in 1834, the earliest of which was "The Rhodora", written in May. A month earlier, he had visited Mount Auburn Cemetery in Cambridge, Massachusetts, and experienced a deeply spiritual communion with the natural setting there.

Emerson's poem is 16 lines long, which he may have intended as a slightly longer version of a sonnet. "The Rhodora" uses a sophisticated form of purposeful symmetry combining octaves, quatrains, and heroic couplets. The poem is clearly divided in half: The first eight lines present the situation and implies the question in the subtitle while the following eight lines present an answer.

"The Rhodora" was included in Emerson's 1847 collection Poems.

== Analysis ==
"The Rhodora" expresses a spiritual connection with a primitive, deified nature and that man can share a kindred relationship with God through Nature. The rhodora is presented as a flower as beautiful as the rose, but which remains humble and does not seek broader fame. The narrator relates to the flower by equally embracing humility as a Christian virtue. "The Rhodora" shows the beginnings of Emerson's thoughts on humanity's connection with the natural world which would be greater expressed in his essay "Nature" in 1836.

Emerson describes the titular rhodora mostly through the sense of sight by focusing on color, particularly its vibrancy in contrast with the dark pool, though he ignores other senses like smell and sound. Literary scholar Elisa New compares the poem to other "American mutability poems" like Philip Freneau's "Wild Honeysuckle" and William Cullen Bryant's "To a Fringed Gentian". Scholar Allan Burns adds to that list other American poems focused on symbolic use of flowers, including Bryant's "The Yellow Violet" and James Russell Lowell's "To the Dandelion".
