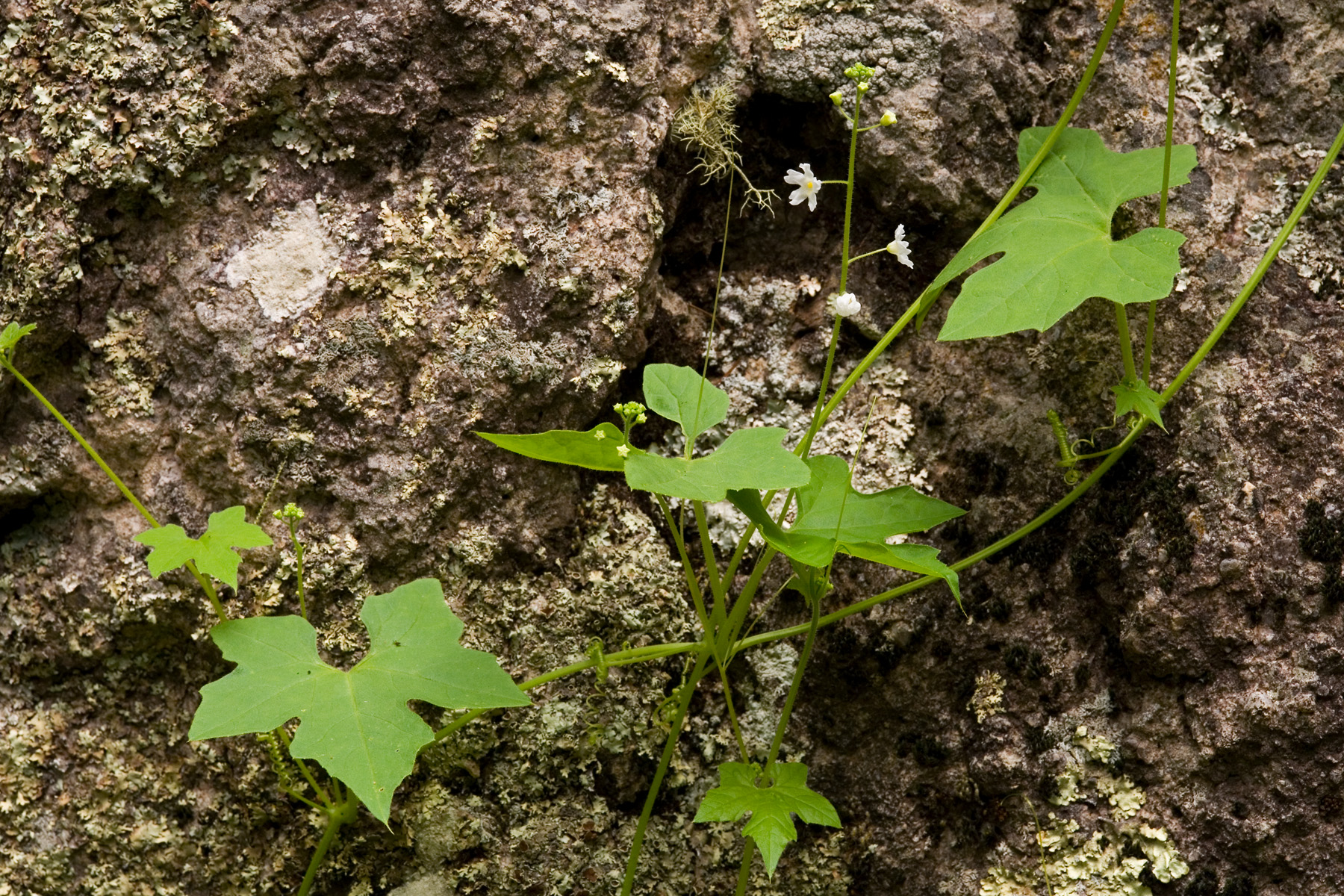
- Echinopepon wrightii in bloom
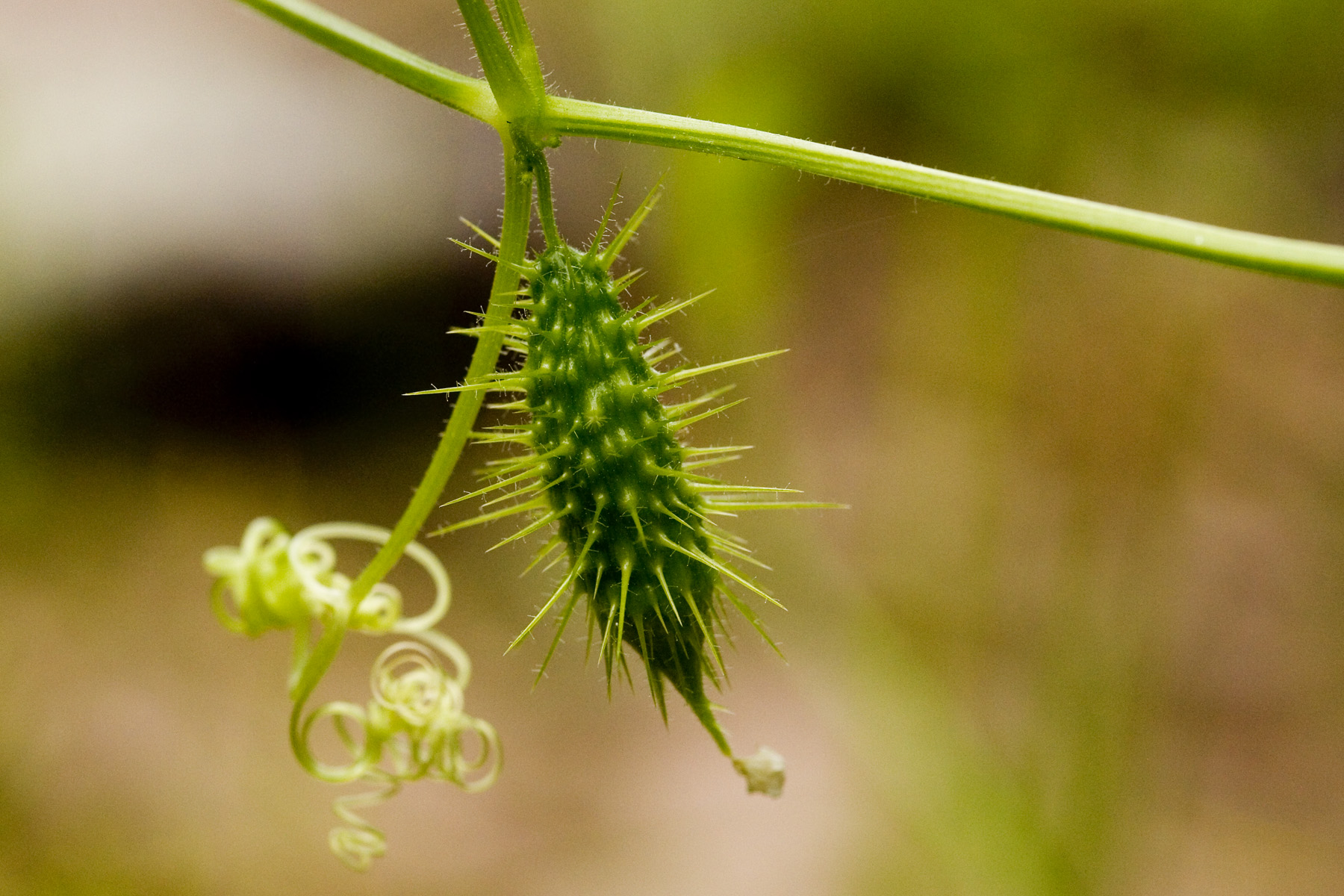
- Close-up of Echinopepon wrightii fruit

Scientific classification
- Kingdom: Plantae
- Clade: Tracheophytes
- Clade: Angiosperms
- Clade: Eudicots
- Clade: Rosids
- Order: Cucurbitales
- Family: Cucurbitaceae
- Subfamily: Cucurbitoideae
- Tribe: Sicyoeae
- Genus: Echinopepon; Naudin

Species
- See text

Synonyms
- Apatzingania Dieterle; Vaseyanthus Cogn.

= Echinopepon =

Genus of Cucurbitaceae plants

Echinopepon is a genus of flowering plants in the family Cucurbitaceae, native to the southwestern United States, Mexico, Central America, and South America. Tendrillate vines, their prickly fruits are operculate, with the prickles themselves being stipitate glandular.

== Species ==
Currently accepted species include:

- Echinopepon arachoideus (Dieterle) A.K.Monro & Stafford
- Echinopepon belizensis A.K.Monro & Stafford
- Echinopepon calcitrapa McVaugh
- Echinopepon cirrhopedunculatus Rose
- Echinopepon coulteri (A.Gray) Rose
- Echinopepon disjunctus Pozner
- Echinopepon glutinosus (Cogn.) A.K.Monro & Stafford
- Echinopepon insularis S.Watson
- Echinopepon jaliscanus Rose
- Echinopepon longispinus (Cogn.) Rose
- Echinopepon milleflorus Naudin
- Echinopepon minimus (Kellogg) S.Watson
- Echinopepon paniculatus (Cogn.) Dieterle
- Echinopepon pringlei Rose
- Echinopepon pubescens (Benth.) Rose
- Echinopepon racemosus (Steud.) C.Jeffrey
- Echinopepon rosei (Cogn.) H.Schaef. & S.S.Renner
- Echinopepon torquatus (Moc. & Sessé ex DC.) Rose
- Echinopepon tultitlanapaensis A.K.Monro & Stafford
- Echinopepon wrightii (A.Gray) S.Watson
