= George Vasey (botanist) =

English-American botanist (1822–1893)

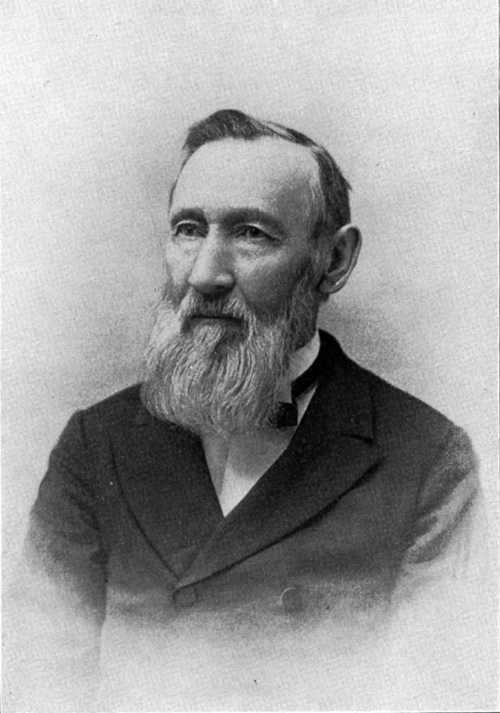
- From Canby & Rose (1893)
- Born: February 28, 1822; Scarborough, North Riding of Yorkshire, England
- Died: March 4, 1893 (aged 71); Washington, D.C., United States
- Resting place: Rock Creek Cemetery
- Education: Berkshire Medical Institute
- Known for: Chief Botanist of USDA, curator of the United States National Herbarium
- Spouse: Martha Jane Scott
- Awards: Hon. M.A., fellow of the American Association for the Advancement of Science and American Academy of Arts and Sciences
- Scientific career
- Workplaces: USDA
- Author abbrev. (botany): Vasey

George Vasey (February 28, 1822 – March 4, 1893) was an English-born American physician, botanist, and agrostologist. He practiced medicine in Illinois for nearly two decades before being appointed Chief Botanist at the United States Department of Agriculture in 1872, a position he held for the remainder of his life. In 1889 the Smithsonian Institution named him Honorary Curator of the United States National Herbarium, the crowning achievement of his career.

The alias George S. Vasey is often used to avoid confusion with his son George Richard Vasey. However, the father never used a middle initial in the 19th century. On letters and publications, he signed his name as George Vasey, Geo. Vasey, or Dr. Geo. Vasey. Most of his herbarium specimens are labeled with the name G. Vasey or one of the previous names. The source of the middle initial is unknown.

== Life ==
George Vasey was born on February 28, 1822 near the town of Scarborough, England, the fourth of ten children. His family emigrated to the United States the next year, settling in the village of Oriskany, New York. He left school at age 12 to become a store clerk in Oriskany. By age 13, he had expressed an interest in botany by manually copying a text book on the subject in its entirety. This interest was nurtured by a chance encounter with the botanist Peter D. Knieskern, who later encouraged young Vasey to correspond with other botanists including Torrey, Gray, and others.

By the age of 21, Vasey had graduated from the Oneida Institute. He attended the Berkshire Medical Institute, graduating with an M.D. degree in 1846. In December of that same year, he married Martha Jane Scott. The couple initially settled in Dexter, New York but in 1848 the family moved to Illinois, first to Elgin, and then to Ringwood. Here Vasey would practice medicine for nearly two decades. During this time, he kept his passion for botany alive by continued correspondence and field work. He became a founding member of the Illinois Natural History Society in 1858, and over the next few years, he wrote prolifically for the society and the weekly newspaper Prairie Farmer.

In 1854, Vasey opened a dry goods store to support his growing family, which now included four children and his mother, Jane Frankish. Within a decade he had three more children but the youngest died from whooping cough in 1864. Seeking a milder climate, Vasey relocated the family to Richview in southern Illinois. Despite this, both his wife and his mother died in 1866. Vasey subsequently stopped writing for about a year. Due to an unrelated legal matter, he was also beset with heavy financial trouble.

Vasey married the widow Rachel Catherine Barber in 1867. While Kate Vasey assumed complete responsibility for the family and its financial affairs, George Vasey considered an offer to participate in an expedition to Colorado. This marked the beginning of Vasey's career as a botanist, which spanned a 25-year period from 1868 to 1893.

Following a brief illness, George Vasey died in Washington, D.C. on March 4, 1893. He was buried in Rock Creek Cemetery.

== Career ==
The explorer John Wesley Powell invited George Vasey to participate in an expedition to the Colorado Territory in 1868. Vasey accepted Powell's offer as Botanist of the Colorado Exploring Expedition of 1868, which left Chicago for Denver in June of that year. By the time the expedition had reached Cheyenne on July 3rd, Vasey and his companions had already collected one hundred and fifty species. He returned to Illinois in December after documenting 66 pages of flora and collecting almost 700 plant specimens. Greatly enthused by the adventure, Vasey dedicated himself to botanical pursuits.

George Vasey co-edited the journal The American Entomologist and Botanist prior to becoming curator of the Illinois State University Natural History Museum in 1870. He resigned the latter position to succeed Charles Christopher Parry as the Chief Botanist at the United States Department of Agriculture in 1872, a position he held until his death in 1893. He quickly began work to improve the poor state of the National Herbarium, by organizing an exhibit of the country's trees for the Centennial Exposition in Philadelphia. The United States National Herbarium, hosted by the Smithsonian Institution, is considered the crowning achievement of his career, particularly its grass collection, of which he was a specialist. In 1889 the Smithsonian named him Honorary Curator. As Chief Botanist he launched the Contributions from the United States National Herbarium. With George Thurber he worked on grasses for Asa Gray and John Torrey's Flora of North America.

Vasey organized a botanical expedition to northern Idaho in 1892. The expedition covered the region from the mouth of the Clearwater River near Lewiston northward to Lake Pend Oreille in the northern Idaho Panhandle. Among the plant collectors on the expedition were Amos Arthur Heller, John Herman Sandberg, and Daniel Trembly MacDougal. In July, the party met the plant collector John Bernhard Leiberg at Lake Pend Oreille. Approximately 25,000 specimens were collected during the expedition, representing about 1,000 species, many of which were new.

Until 1870 he would maintain an extensive correspondence and collect a great many specimens both in Oneida County and later McHenry County. However, he did not publish material of scientific relevance until the 1870s. Of his published work his several-volumes monograph of the United States grass, the last part of which was published after his death, is one of the most notable, as are his 1884 Agricultural Grasses of the United States and his work to describe unpublished species who had accumulated in the herbarium, a work he completed less than a week before his death in 1893.

== Awards ==
He was granted an honorary M.A. in 1864 from Illinois Wesleyan University. In 1869 he was made a fellow of the American Association for the Advancement of Science, and in 1892, of the American Academy of Arts and Sciences; that same year he was representative to the 1892 International Botanical Congress in Genoa, where he was a vice-president.

== Selected publications ==
Upon his death in 1893, a comprehensive bibliography of the published works by George Vasey was prepared by Josephine A. Clark, Botanical Division, U.S. Department of Agriculture.

- Delineations of the Ox Tribe; or, the Natural History of Bulls, Bisons, and Buffaloes (London: G. Biggs, 1851)
- A Descriptive Catalogue of the Native Forest Trees of the United States (Washington, 1876)
- The Grasses of the United States, a Synopsis of the Tribes, with Descriptions of the Genera (1883)
- Agricultural Grasses of the United States (1884)
- A Descriptive Catalogue of the Grasses of the United States (1885)
- Report of an Investigation of the Grasses of the Arid Districts (2 parts, 1886–87)
- Grasses of the South (1887)
- Grasses of the Southwest (1890–91)
- Grasses of the Pacific Slope (1892–93)

== Legacy ==
Three genera have been named in honor of George Vasey: Vaseya, Vaseyanthus, and Vaseyochloa. In addition, there are dozens of published botanical names that include an epithet such as vaseyi, vaseyanus, vaseyana, or vaseyanum. Some of these names honor George Vasey while others acknowledge his son, George R. Vasey, a plant collector who collected thousands of plants between 1875 and 1889. Notable examples of names that recognize the elder Vasey include Juncus vaseyi, Potamogeton vaseyi, Quercus vaseyana, and Chrysothamnus vaseyi.

The genus Vaseya was established when the American botanist George Thurber described Vaseya comata in 1863. At a time when Vasey was still practicing medicine in Illinois, Thurber characterized him as "one of the most zealous of our Western botanists". The Belgian botanist Alfred Cogniaux established genus Vaseyanthus by describing Vaseyanthus rosei in 1891. In his description, Cogniaux referred to Vasey as a "learned botanist". The American botanist Albert Spear Hitchcock described the genus Vaseyochloa in 1933. The member species Vaseyochloa multinervosa (Vasey) Hitchc. was first described as Melica multinervosa by Vasey himself. As of December 2024, Vaseya Thurb. and Vaseyanthus Cogn. are synonyms of Muhlenbergia Schreb. and Echinopepon Naudin, respectively, whereas the generic name Vaseyochloa Hitchc. is widely accepted.

George Vasey began collecting plants as a teenager growing up in Oneida County, New York. He continued to collect plants throughout the 20 years he practiced medicine in Illinois. At least two of his specimens were later described as new species. The botanist George Engelmann named and described Juncus vaseyi in 1866, and one year later, in 1867, the botanist James Watson Robbins named and described Potamogeton vaseyi. The type specimens for both species were collected by George Vasey near his home in Ringwood, Illinois. Engelmann described Vasey as a man "who paid a good deal of attention to [Juncus] and to the botany of his neighborhood generally". Today Juncus vaseyi and Potamogeton vaseyi are commonly known as Vasey's rush and Vasey's pondweed, respectively.

As co-editor of the journal The American Entomologist and Botanist, George Vasey wrote a series of articles about the American oaks in 1870. The American botanist Samuel Botsford Buckley named and described Quercus vaseyana in 1883. Buckley named the new species in honor of Dr. Vasey but he was apparently unaware of Vasey's writings on the subject. Quercus vaseyana is commonly called the Vasey oak.

Chrysothamnus vaseyi was first described as Bigelowia vaseyi by the American botanist Asa Gray in 1876. The type specimen was collected by George Vasey at Middle Park in the Rocky Mountains of Colorado in 1868. The specimen was one of hundreds of specimens collected by Vasey during the Powell Colorado Exploring Expedition. Chrysothamnus vaseyi is commonly called Vasey's rabbitbrush.

In 1869, while exploring the Colorado River of the Grand Canyon, John Wesley Powell discovered a whitewater spring cascading down a limestone cliff:

Riding down a short distance, a beautiful view is presented…a wall, set with a million brilliant gems…On coming nearer, we find fountains bursting from the rock, high overhead, and the spray in the sunshine forms the gems which bedeck the wall. The rocks below the fountain are covered with mosses, and ferns, and many beautiful flowering plants.

Powell named it Vasey's Paradise in honor of his friend and colleague but Vasey never saw the springs that bear his name.

== Bibliography ==
- Buckley, S. B. (1883). "Some new Texan plants". Bulletin of the Torrey Botanical Club. 10 (8): 90–91. doi:10.2307/2476848. JSTOR 2476848.
- Coville, Frederick Vernon (May 1893). "Death of Dr. George Vasey". Bulletin of the Torrey Botanical Club. 20 (5): 218–220. JSTOR 2477497.
- Canby, Wm. M.; Rose, J. N. (May 1893). "George Vasey: A Biographical Sketch". Botanical Gazette. 18 (5): 178–183. doi:10.1086/326929. JSTOR 2464581. S2CID 84771961.
- Engelmann, George (1868). "A revision of the North American species of the genus Juncus, with a description of new or imperfectly known species". Transactions of the Academy of Science of Saint Louis. 2: 424–498.
- Ewan, Joseph; Ewan, Nesta Dunn (1981). Biographical dictionary of Rocky Mountain naturalists: a guide to the writings and collections of botanists, zoologists, geologists, artists and photographers, 1682–1932. Utrecht/Antwerpen: Bohn, Scheltema & Holkema. ISBN 90-313-0415-8.
- Gray, Asa (1876). "Contributions to the botany of North America". Proceedings of the American Academy of Arts and Sciences. 12: 51–84. doi:10.2307/25138435. JSTOR 25138435.
- MacDougal, D. T. (1892). "Recent botanical explorations in Idaho". Science. 20 (513): 311–313. Bibcode:1892Sci....20..311M. doi:10.1126/science.ns-20.513.311. JSTOR 1767755. PMID 17789540.
- Pennington, Susan J. (2004). "The Rebirth of the Contributions Series" (PDF). The Plant Press. 7 (4): 1, 14–15.
- Powell, J. W. (1875). Exploration of the Colorado River of the West and its tributaries Explored in 1869, 1870, 1871, and 1872. Washington: Government Printing Office.
- Stafleu, Frans A.; Cowan, Richard S. (1986). Taxonomic literature: a selective guide to botanical publications and collections with dates, commentaries and types: Taxon. Lit. (TL2). Vol. 6 (2nd ed.). Utrecht: Bohn, Scheltema & Holkema. ISBN 90-313-0714-9.
- Vasey, George (1870a). "The oaks". The American Entomologist and Botanist. 2. pp. 249–250, pp. 280–282.
- Vasey, George (1870b). "Our native oaks". The American Entomologist and Botanist. 2. pp. 311–313, pp. 344–345, pp. 375–377.
