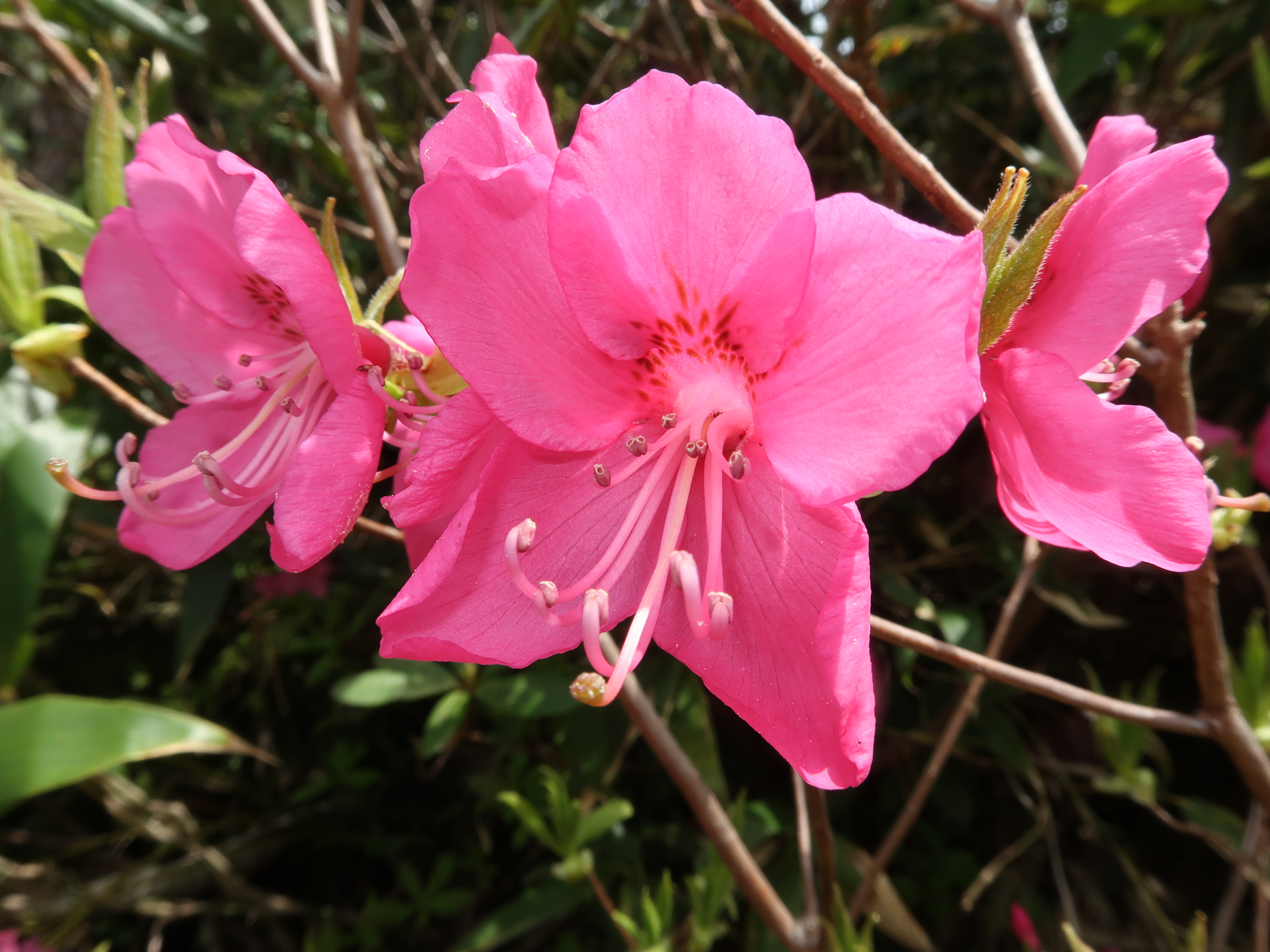

Scientific classification
- Kingdom: Plantae
- Clade: Tracheophytes
- Clade: Angiosperms
- Clade: Eudicots
- Clade: Asterids
- Order: Ericales
- Family: Ericaceae
- Genus: Rhododendron
- Species: R. albrechtii

Binomial name
- Rhododendron albrechtii Maxim.

Synonyms
- Homotypic Synonyms: Azalea albrechtii (Maxim.) Kuntze; Heterotypic Synonyms: Rhododendron albrechtii f. albiflorum T.Yamaz.; Rhododendron albrechtii f. canescens Sugim.; Rhododendron albrechtii var. hypoleucum Honda; Rhododendron albrechtii f. hypoleucum (Honda) H.Hara

= Rhododendron albrechtii =

Species of flowering plant

Rhododendron albrechtii is a species of flowering plant in the family Ericaceae. It is endemic to Japanese temperate rainforests. Native of central and northern Japan; described from specimens collected in the 1860s by Michael Albrecht of the Russian Consulate at Hakodate, for whom the species is named.

== Description ==
Rhododendron albrechtii is a deciduous shrub growing up to 4 feet tall. The leaves often arranged in clusters of five. Pink and magenta flowers bloom in early spring in clusters of three to five.

== Distribution and habitat ==
Rhododendron albrechtii thrives in cold, sub-alpine zones in the rainforests of Honshu and Hokkaido. It is cultivated in Europe.

== Ecology ==
This rhododendron seems to prefer woodland conditions.
