= James Watson Robbins =

American physician

James Watson Robbins (November 18, 1801 – January 10, 1879) was an American medical doctor and botanist.

Robbins, son of Ammi R. and Salome Robbing, of Colebrook, Connecticut, and grandson of Rev. Ammi R. Robbins, of Norfolk, Connecticut, was born in Colebrook, November 18, 1801.

He graduated from Yale College in 1822. For a few months after graduation he taught in Enfield, Connecticut, and then went to Virginia, where he was similarly employed for some three years, in the family of Hon. Wm. L. Brent, and in the Peyton family at Warrenton, and at Arlington, where Robert E. Lee, afterwards general-in-chief of the Confederate army, was prepared by him for West Point. Returning to New Haven in the latter part of 1825, he began the study of medicine, graduating from Yale Medical School in 1828. He spent six months of the year 1829 in a botanical exploration of the New England states; and in this way formed the acquaintance of Dr. George Willard, of Uxbridge, Massachusetts, who induced him to settle in that town. He practiced medicine in Uxbridge (at first in partnership with Dr. Willard) for thirty years, until 1859, when he accepted an appointment as physician and surgeon of several copper mining companies near Portage Lake, Lake Superior, Michigan.

During his professional life he had devoted himself largely to botany, gathering a valuable library, second, it is believed, to no private botanical library in the country; and in the four years of his residence near Lake Superior, he made extensive botanical researches, and these were followed by a tour in 1863-4 down the Mississippi to Texas and Cuba, which resulted in very valuable collections. He then returned to Uxbridge, where he spent the remainder of his life, mostly retired from medical practice and devoting his leisure to his favorite pursuit. He died there, January 10, 1879, in his 78th year, of a disease of the kidneys, caused by the presence of trichinae. He was unmarried.

The standard author abbreviation J.W.Robbins is used to indicate this person as the author when citing a botanical name.

This article incorporates public domain material from the Yale Obituary Record.
