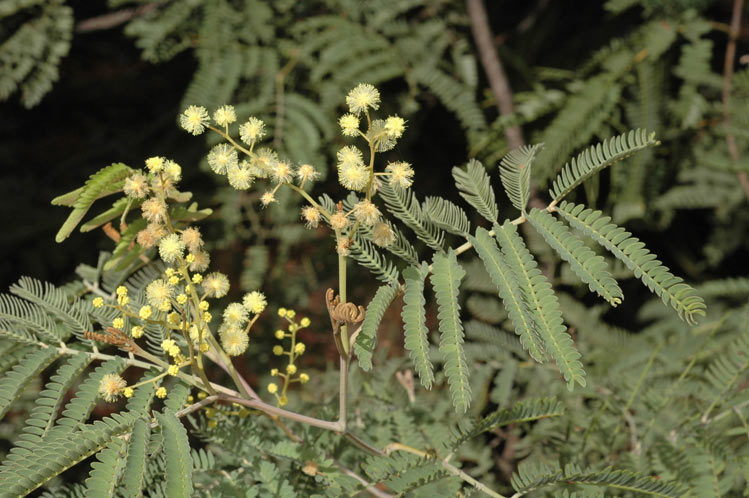
- In the Australian National Botanic Gardens

Conservation status
- Least Concern (IUCN 3.1)

Scientific classification
- Kingdom: Plantae
- Clade: Tracheophytes
- Clade: Angiosperms
- Clade: Eudicots
- Clade: Rosids
- Order: Fabales
- Family: Fabaceae
- Subfamily: Caesalpinioideae
- Clade: Mimosoid clade
- Genus: Acacia
- Species: A. glaucocarpa

Binomial name
- Acacia glaucocarpa Maiden & Blakely
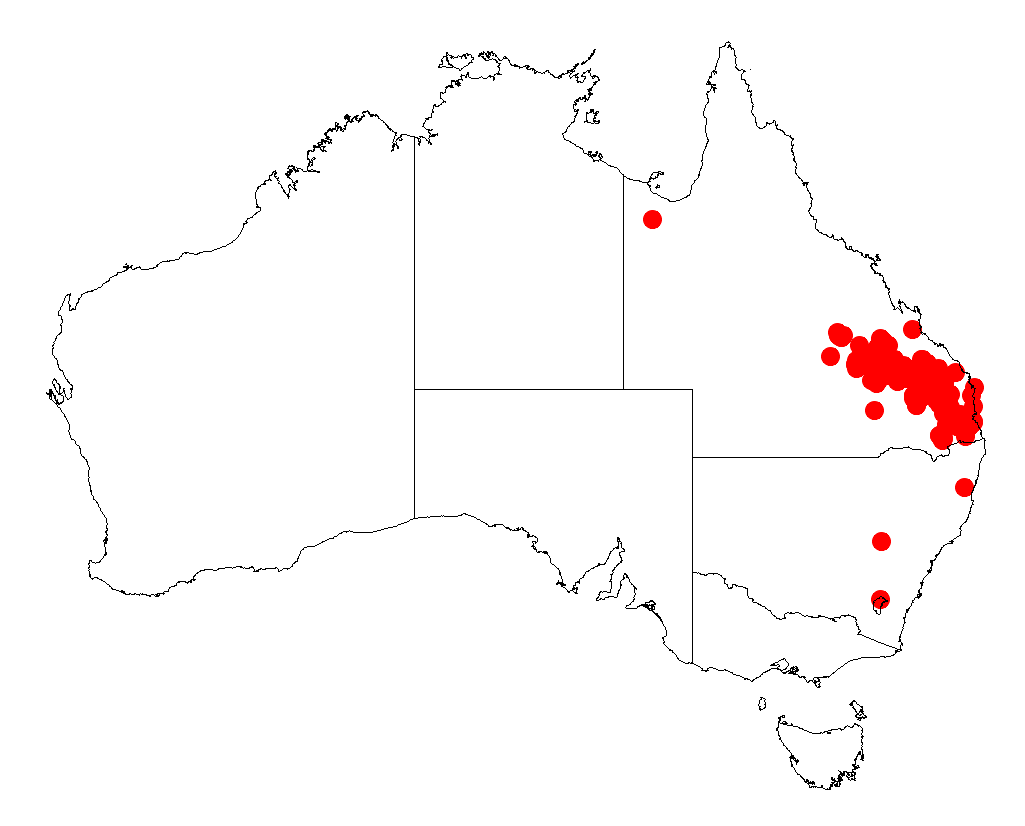
- Occurrence data from AVH

Synonyms
- Acacia polybotrya var. foliolosa Benth.; Racosperma glaucocarpum (Maiden & Blakely) Pedley

= Acacia glaucocarpa =

Hickory wattle

Species of legume

Acacia glaucocarpa, commonly known as hickory wattle or glory wattle, is a species of flowering plant in the family Fabaceae and is endemic to Queensland, Australia. It is a shrub or tree with faintly ridged branchlets covered woolly hairs on the ends, bipinnate leaves, spherical heads of pale yellow to cream coloured flowers and more or less leathery pods.

== Description ==
Acacia glaucocarpa is a shrub or tree that typically grows to a height of 2.5–10 m (8 ft 2 in – 32 ft 10 in) and has slightly fissured grey or grey-brown bark. Its branchlets are terete, faintly ridged with woolly hairs near the end. The leaves are bipinnate, bluish green, with three to eight pairs of pinnae 35–110 mm (1.4–4.3 in) long on a rachis 30–100 mm (1.2–3.9 in) long with a petiole 10–30 mm (0.39–1.18 in) long. Each pinna has 12 to 33 pairs of knife-like to narrowly oblong, narrowly elliptic or lance-shaped pinnules 5–14 mm (0.20–0.55 in) wide and 2–4 mm (0.079–0.157 in) wide. The flowers are borne in spherical heads in panicles on the ends of branches or in axils, each head with 15 to 30 pale yellow or cream-coloured flowers. Flowering occurs from February to July, and the pods are more or less straight-sided, 50–130 mm (2.0–5.1 in) long and 6.5–10 mm (0.26–0.39 in) wide, slightly leathery, blue-green or blue-black and more or less pruinose.

== Taxonomy ==
Acacia glaucocarpa was first formally described in 1927 by Joseph Maiden and William Blakely in the Proceedings of the Royal Society of Queensland.

== Distribution and habitat ==
Hickory wattle has a wide distribution in open forest or woodland area in southeastern Queensland from about 82 km (51 mi) west of Emerald in Queensland, and south to near the New South Wales border. It is common near Kingaroy and Ipswich. It is known to occur within protected areas and is found in many localities. It grows on sandstone or sedimentary rocks, often in deep soil.

== Conservation status ==
Acacia glaucocarpa is listed as of "least concern" under the Queensland Government Nature Conservation Act 1992.

== See also ==
- List of Acacia species
