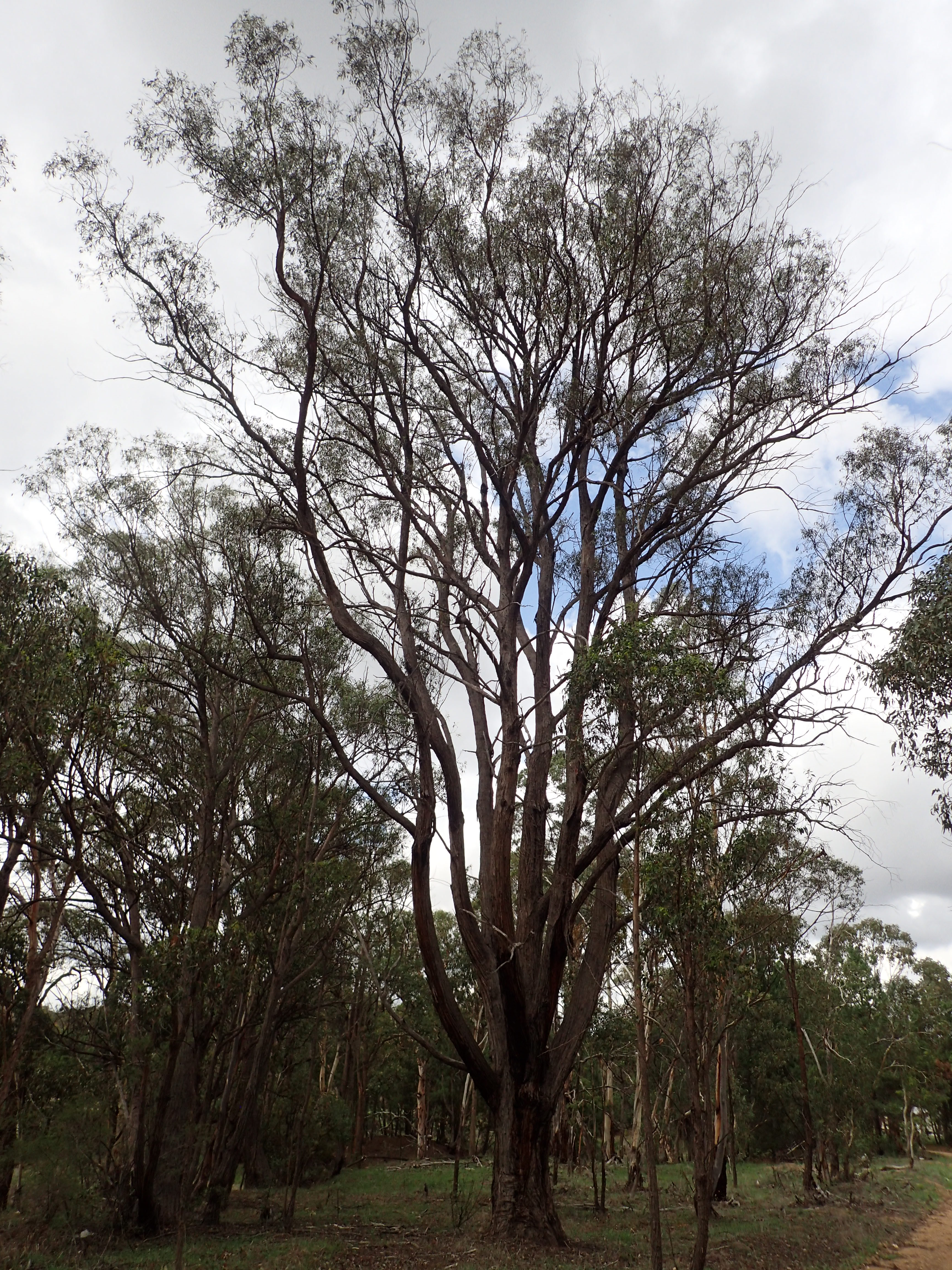
- Eucalyptus youmanii near Uralla

Scientific classification
- Kingdom: Plantae
- Clade: Embryophytes
- Clade: Tracheophytes
- Clade: Spermatophytes
- Clade: Angiosperms
- Clade: Eudicots
- Clade: Rosids
- Order: Myrtales
- Family: Myrtaceae
- Genus: Eucalyptus
- Species: E. youmanii

Binomial name
- Eucalyptus youmanii Blakely & McKie

Synonyms
- Eucalyptus prominula L.A.S.Johnson & K.D.Hill; Eucalyptus sp. MAHCL; Eucalyptus stannicola L.A.S.Johnson & K.D.Hill; Eucalyptus subtilior L.A.S.Johnson & K.D.Hill; Eucalyptus youmani Blakely & McKie orth. var.; Eucalyptus youmanii Blakely & McKie var. youmanii

= Eucalyptus youmanii =

Youman's stringybark

Species of eucalyptus

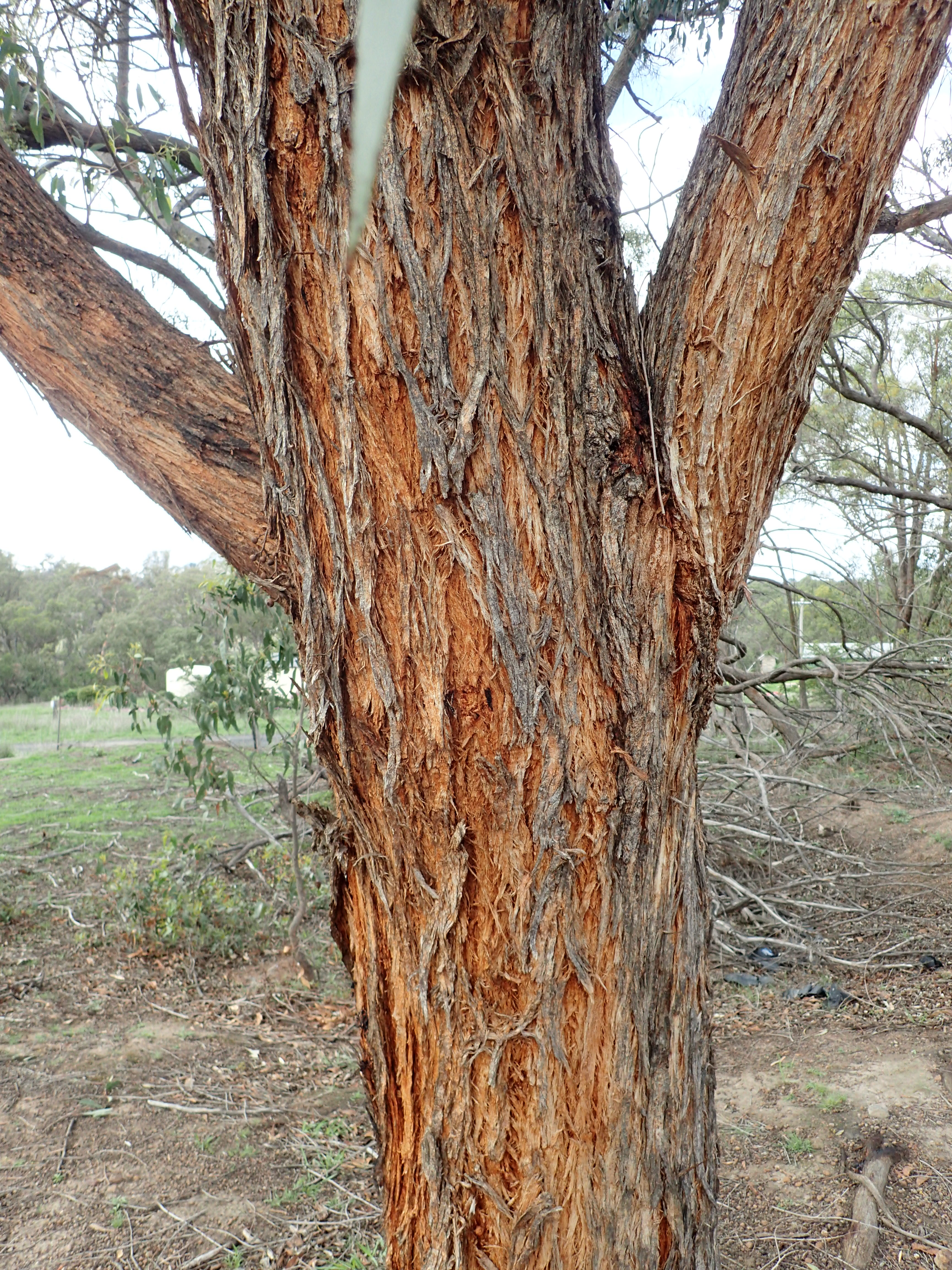
Bark

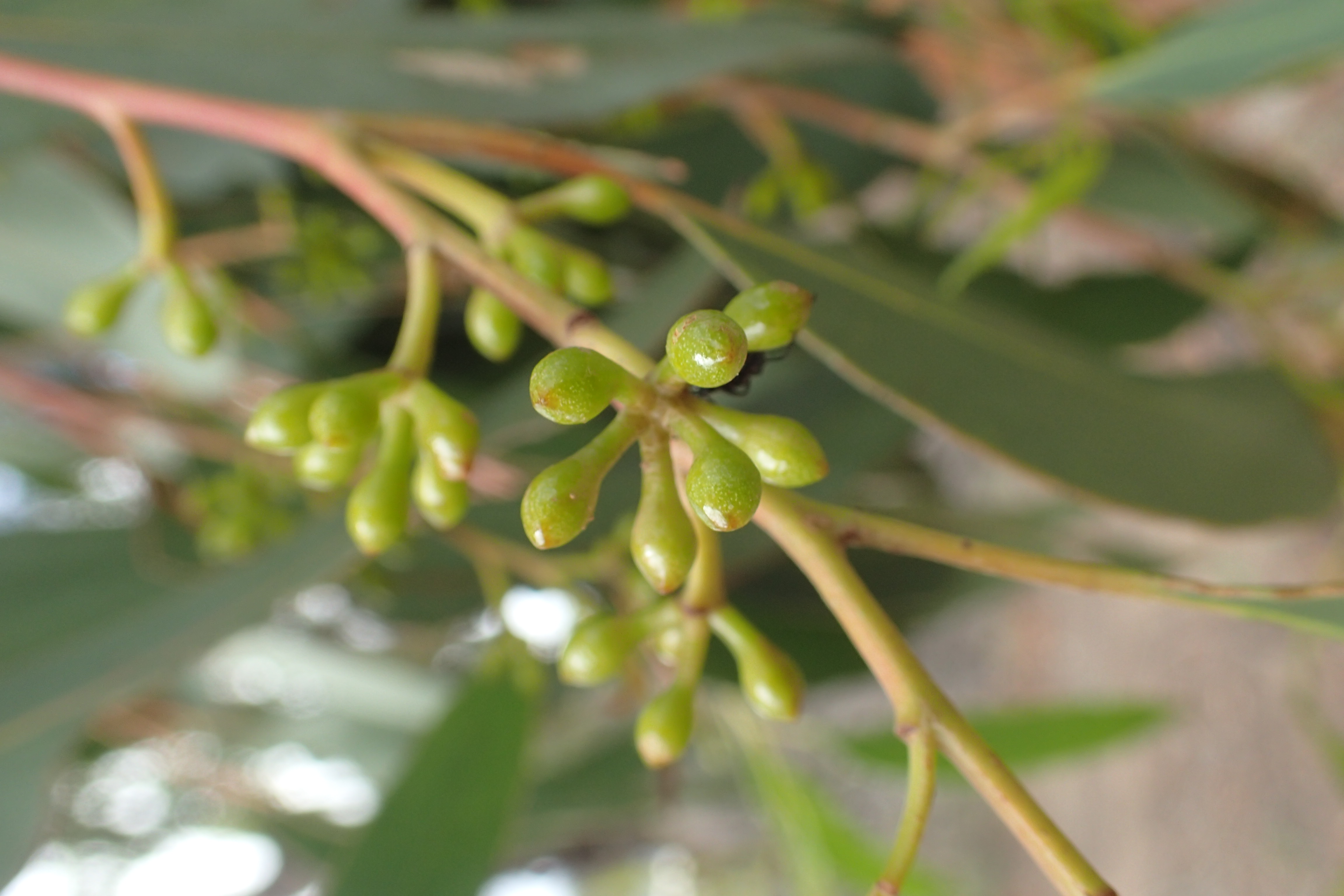
Flower buds

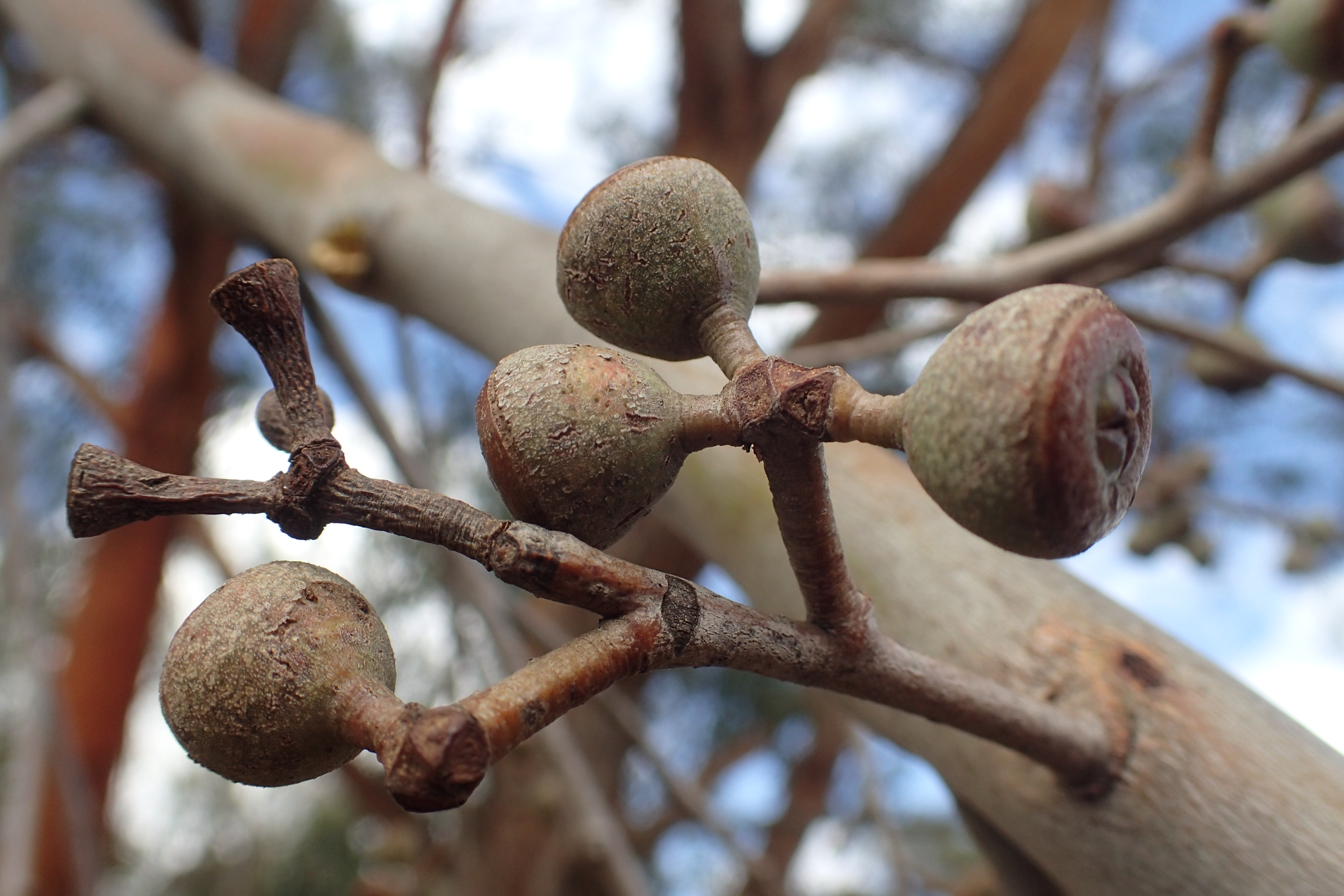
Fruit

Eucalyptus youmanii, commonly known as Youman's stringybark, is a species of small to medium-sized tree that is endemic to eastern Australia. It has rough, stringy bark on the trunk and branches, lance-shaped or curved adult leaves, flower buds in groups of seven, white flowers and hemispherical fruit.

== Description ==
Eucalyptus youmanii is a tree that typically grows to a height of 20 m (66 ft) and forms a lignotuber. It has rough, stringy, greyish, furrowed bark on the trunk and branches. Young plants and coppice regrowth have leaves that are paler on the lower surface, egg-shaped to lance-shaped, 50–110 mm (2.0–4.3 in) long and 15–40 mm (0.59–1.57 in) wide. Adult leaves are slightly paler on the lower surface, lance-shaped to curved, 55–160 mm (2.2–6.3 in) long and 12–32 mm (0.47–1.26 in) wide on a petiole 7–20 mm (0.28–0.79 in) long. The flower buds are arranged in leaf axils in groups of seven on an unbranched peduncle 5–23 mm (0.20–0.91 in) long, the individual buds sessile or on pedicels up to 6 mm (0.24 in) long. Mature buds are oval, spindle-shaped or diamond-shaped, 7–9 mm (0.28–0.35 in) long and 4–5 mm (0.16–0.20 in) wide with a conical operculum. Flowering occurs in February and March and the flowers are white. The fruit is a woody hemispherical capsule 4–8 mm (0.16–0.31 in) long and 7–13 mm (0.28–0.51 in) wide with the valves protruding.

== Taxonomy and naming ==
Eucalyptus youmanii was first formally described in 1930 by William Blakely and Ernest McKie in Proceedings of the Linnean Society of New South Wales from material collected near Guyra in 1920. The specific epithet (youmanii) honours Thomas Youman (1874–1962), who, with Blakely and McKie, collected the type specimens on his farm.

== Distribution and habitat ==
Youman's stringybark grows in woodland on poor soils from the Armidale-Guyra area in New South Wales to near Stanthorpe in Queensland.
