= Eucalyptus × tinghaensis =

Scientific classification
- Kingdom: Plantae
- Clade: Tracheophytes
- Clade: Angiosperms
- Clade: Eudicots
- Clade: Rosids
- Order: Myrtales
- Family: Myrtaceae
- Genus: Eucalyptus
- Species: E. × tinghaensis

Binomial name
- Eucalyptus × tinghaensis Blakely & McKie

Species of eucalyptus

Eucalyptus × tinghaensis is a eucalypt that is native to New South Wales. It was first formally described in 1930 by William Blakely and Ernest McKie in the Proceedings of the Linnean Society of New South Wales from specimens collected near Tingha in 1929.

According to George Chippendale in the Flora of Australia, it is a hybrid between E. caliginosa and E. mckieana. The name is accepted at Plants of the World Online but not by the Australian Plant Census.

== See also ==
- List of Eucalyptus species
