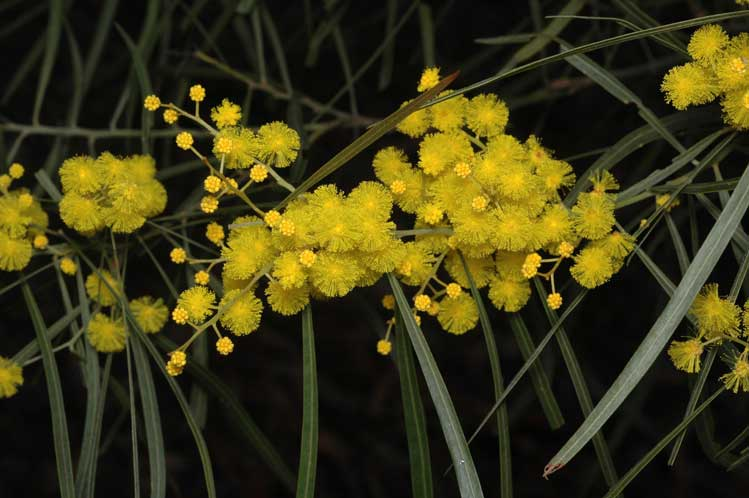
- In the ANBG

Conservation status
- Least Concern (IUCN 3.1)

Scientific classification
- Kingdom: Plantae
- Clade: Embryophytes
- Clade: Tracheophytes
- Clade: Spermatophytes
- Clade: Angiosperms
- Clade: Eudicots
- Clade: Rosids
- Order: Fabales
- Family: Fabaceae
- Subfamily: Caesalpinioideae
- Clade: Mimosoid clade
- Genus: Acacia
- Species: A. angusta

Binomial name
- Acacia angusta Maiden & Blakely

= Acacia angusta =

Species of legume

Acacia angusta is a species of flowering plant in the family Fabaceae and is endemic to Queensland. It is a tree or shrub with thin, linear phyllodes, spherical heads of 12 to 20 flowers, and linear, thinly papery pods up to about 140 mm (5.5 in) long.

== Description ==
Acacia angusta is a tree or shrub that typically grows to a height of about 3–6 m (9.8–19.7 ft) and has reddish-brown branchlets. Its phyllodes are linear, more or less glabrous, usually 90–200 mm (3.5–7.9 in) long, 1.8–3 mm (0.071–0.118 in) wide and often have a hooked end. The flowers are borne in racemes 10–30 mm (0.39–1.18 in) long on a peduncle 2–5 mm (0.079–0.197 in) long with spherical heads, each with 12 to 20 flowers. Flowering has been observed in January and from March to August, and the pods are linear, thinly papery, rounded over the seeds, up to 140 mm (5.5 in) long and about 5 mm (0.20 in) wide, containing seeds 4–5 mm (0.16–0.20 in) long with a club-shaped aril.

== Taxonomy ==
Acacia angusta was first formally described in 1927 by Joseph Maiden and William Blakely in the Proceedings of the Royal Society of Queensland from specimens collected in Springsure by John Luke Boorman in 1913. The specific epithet (angusta) means 'narrowed'.

== Distribution and habitat ==
This species of Acacia grows in loamy and stony soils in isolated populations between the Gogango Range near Rockhampton and the Drummond Range west of Emerald.

== Conservation status ==
Acacia angusta is listed as of "least concern" under the Queensland Government Nature Conservation Act 1992.

== See also ==
- List of Acacia species
