= Ernest Norman McKie =

Australian botanist (1882–1948)

- Born: 1 July 1882; Barraba, New South Wales, Australia
- Died: 19 May 1948 (aged 65); Armidale, Australia
- Citizenship: Australia
- Scientific career
- Fields: botany
- Author abbrev. (botany): McKie

Ernest Norman McKie (1 July 1882 – 19 May 1948) was an Australian clergyman who was also an amateur botanist with a detailed knowledge of the eucalypts and grasses of the New England district of New South Wales. He was born in Barraba in 1882, entered St Andrew's College, University of Sydney where he graduated in 1906, then completed his theological studies before being posted to Manilla in 1908, then Bendemeer, later Guyra in 1912.

McKie was also an amateur botanist and had a detailed knowledge of the eucalypts and grasses of the New England district of New South Wales. He kept in contact with William Faris Blakely and collaborated in the descriptions of several eucalypts and other species in the area, including E. caliginosa, E. cameronii, E. tinghaensis, E. youmanii and Grevillea sarmentosa (now G. scortechinii subsp. sarmentosa. He was also the first secretary of the New South Wales Agricultural Bureau and was a member of the Australian Institute of Agricultural Science, the Royal Society of New South Wales and the Linnean Society of New South Wales, who published papers contributed by him. Blakely published the first formal description of Eucalyptus mckieana, in honour of McKie, noting his "intimate field and botanical knowledge of the New England Eucalypts".

The standard author abbreviation McKie is used to indicate this person as the author when citing a botanical name.
