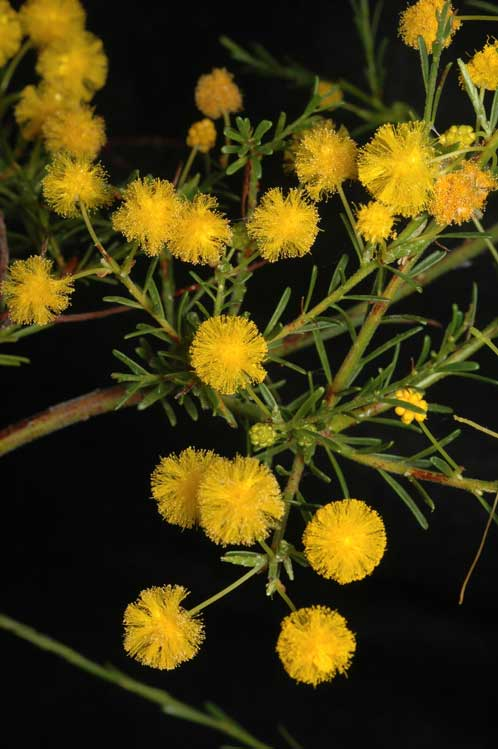
- In the Australian National Botanic Gardens

Scientific classification
- Kingdom: Plantae
- Clade: Tracheophytes
- Clade: Angiosperms
- Clade: Eudicots
- Clade: Rosids
- Order: Fabales
- Family: Fabaceae
- Subfamily: Caesalpinioideae
- Clade: Mimosoid clade
- Genus: Acacia
- Species: A. oxyclada

Binomial name
- Acacia oxyclada F.Muell. erBenth.
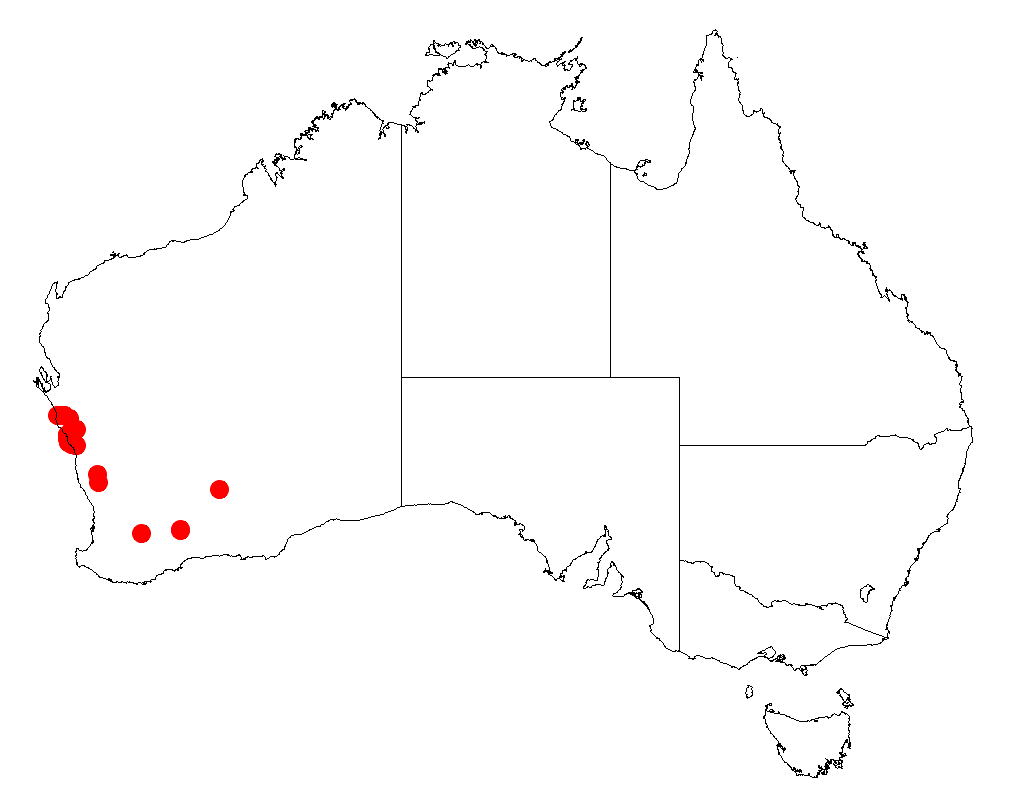
- Occurrence data from AVH

Synonyms
- Racosperma oxycladum (F.Muell. ex Benth.) Pedley; Acacia ulicina (auct. non Meisn.: Mueller, F.J.H. von (1887)

= Acacia oxyclada =

Species of plant

Acacia oxyclada is a species of flowering plant in the family Fabaceae, and is endemic to the south-west of Western Australia. It is a spreading to erect or prostrate, shrub with straight, spiny, glabrous branchlets, more or less erect, narrowly oblong to linear, flattened phyllodes, slightly oblong heads of golden yellow flowers and straight to curved, firmly papery pods.

== Description ==
Acacia oxyclada is a spreading to erect or prostrate shrub that typically grows to a height of 0.1–1 m (3.9 in – 3 ft 3.4 in) high, with short, slender, inclined to ascending, spiny branchlets. Its phyllodes are more or less erect, narrowly oblong to linear and horizontally flattened, 7–13 mm (0.28–0.51 in) long, 1.0–1.5 mm (0.039–0.059 in) wide, green, glabrous or subglabrous with one obscure vein on the upper surface and three on the lower side, sometimes with a gland on the upper surface near the end. The flowers are borne in a slightly oblong head in axils on peduncles 5–10 mm (0.20–0.39 in) long., each head with 20 to 25 golden yellow flowers. Flowering occurs from August to October, and the pods are straight to curved, up to 50 mm (2.0 in) long, 3–4 mm (0.12–0.16 in) wide, firmly papery and glabrous. The seeds are egg-shaped and shiny with an aril about as long as the seed.

== Taxonomy ==
Acacia oxyclada was first formally described in 1864 by George Bentham in his Flora Australiensis from an unpublished description by Ferdinand von Mueller of specimens collected near the Murchison River by Augustus Oldfield. The specific epithet (oxyclada) means 'a sharp shoot'.

== Distribution and habitat ==
This species of wattle grows in sand, lateritic sand, sandy loam, loam and rocky loam, often on sandplains in low Acacia shrubland mainly from the Greenough River near Geraldton and north to near Kalbarri with single collections from near Moora and Lake Varley, in the Geraldton Sandplains, Mallee and Swan Coastal Plain bioregions of south-western Western Australia.

== See also ==
- List of Acacia species
