= William Blakely =

Australian botanist (1875–1941)

William Faris Blakely
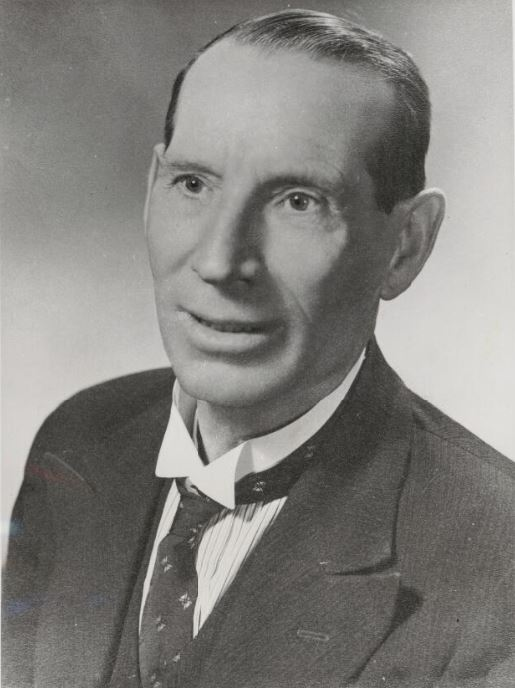
- Blakely in 1900
- Born: November 1875; Tenterfield, New South Wales, Australia
- Died: 1 September 1941 (aged 65); Hornsby, New South Wales, Australia
- Citizenship: Australian
- Known for: Botanical collector
- Scientific career
- Fields: botany

William Faris Blakely (November 1875 – 1 September 1941) was an Australian botanist and collector. From 1913 to 1940 he worked in the National Herbarium of New South Wales, working with Joseph Maiden on Eucalyptus. Maiden named a red gum in his honour, Eucalyptus blakelyi. His botanical work centred particularly on Acacias, Loranthaceae and Eucalypts.

The standard author abbreviation Blakely is used to indicate this person as the author when citing a botanical name.

== Some published names ==
(incomplete)

- Acacia abrupta Maiden & Blakely Journal and Proceedings of the Royal Society of Western Australia 1927
- Acacia acellerata Maiden & Blakely Journal and Proceedings of the Royal Society of Western Australia 1927
- Astrotricha crassifolia Blakely—Proc. Linn. Soc. N. S. W. 1925, 1. 385..
- Olearia stilwellae Blakely—Proc. Linn. Soc. N. S. W. 1925, 1.385.
- Hibbertia dentata var. calva Blakely—Contr. New South Wales Natl. Herb. 1(3) 1951
- Brachyloma daphnoides var. glabrum Blakely—Contr. New South Wales Natl. Herb. 1(3) 1951
- Bertya astrotricha Blakely—Contr. New South Wales Natl. Herb. 1(3) 1951
- Bertya mollissima Blakely—Contr. New South Wales Natl. Herb. 1(3) 1951
- Bertya oblonga Blakely Proc. Linn. Soc. N. S. W. liv. 682 (1929).
- Eucalyptus wandoo Blakely A Key to the Eucalypts 1934

== Publications ==
(incomplete)

- Blakely, W.F. 1922. The Loranthaceae of Australia. Part iii. Proceedings of the Linnean Society of New South Wales 47(4)
- Blakely, W.F. 1965. A key to the eucalypts : with descriptions of 522 species and 150 varieties. Trove: summary

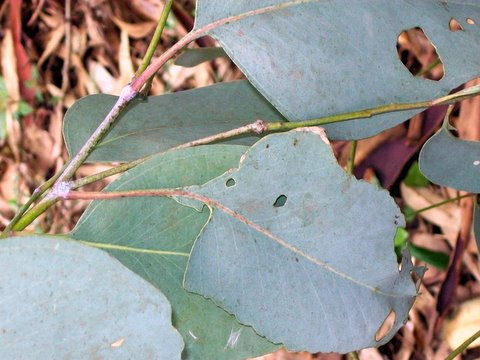
Eucalyptus blakelyi named in honour of William Blakely
