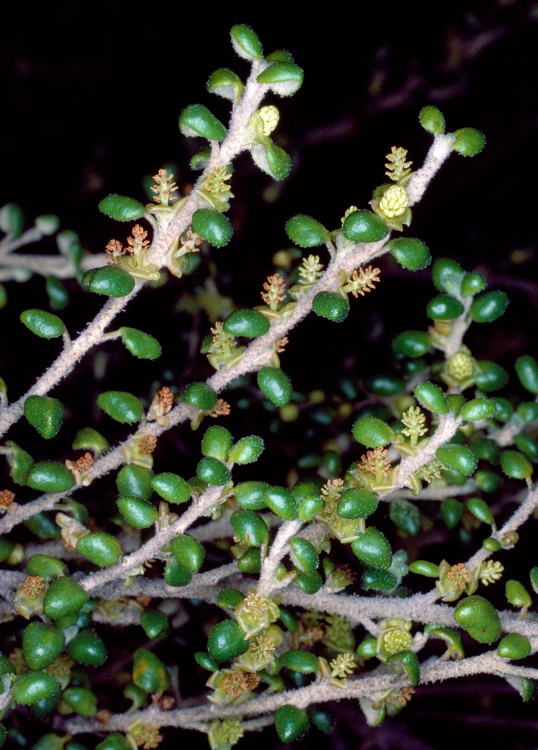
- In the Australian National Botanic Gardens

Scientific classification
- Kingdom: Plantae
- Clade: Tracheophytes
- Clade: Angiosperms
- Clade: Eudicots
- Clade: Rosids
- Order: Malpighiales
- Family: Euphorbiaceae
- Genus: Bertya
- Species: B. rotundifolia

Binomial name
- Bertya rotundifolia F.Muell.

= Bertya rotundifolia =

Species of flowering plant

Bertya rotundifolia, commonly known as Kangaroo Island bertya, is a species of flowering plant in the family Euphorbiaceae and is endemic to Kangaroo Island in South Australia. It is a monoecious, sometimes dioecious shrub, with egg-shaped or round leaves, and more or less sessile flowers borne singly in leaf axils.

== Description ==
Bertya rotundifolia is a monoecious or sometimes dioecious shrub that typically grows to a height of up to 4 m (13 ft). Its branchlets are densely covered with white, star-shaped hairs at first, later glabrous. The leaves are egg-shaped or round, 5–10 mm (0.20–0.39 in) long and 3–8 mm (0.12–0.31 in) wide on a petiole 1.4–2.5 mm (0.055–0.098 in) long. The upper surface of the leaves are green, and the lower surface white and densely covered with star-shaped hairs.

The flowers are borne singly in leaf axils on a peduncle 0.5–0.8 mm (0.020–0.031 in) long and there are four to eight narrowly egg-shaped to egg-shaped bracts, the outer bracts 1.1–2.0 mm (0.043–0.079 in) long and 0.7–1.5 mm (0.028–0.059 in) wide, the inner bracts slightly shorter and narrower. Male flowers are sessile with five brown egg-shaped to elliptic sepal lobes 1.5–3 mm (0.059–0.118 in) long and 1.3–2.2 mm (0.051–0.087 in) wide and 18 to 25 stamens. Female flowers are more or less sessile, the five light yellowish green sepal lobes narrowly egg-shaped, 1.5–2.2 mm (0.059–0.087 in) long, 0.7–1.5 mm (0.028–0.059 in) wide and there are no petals. The ovary is nearly spherical about 1.5 mm (0.059 in) long and wide and densely covered with star-shaped hairs, the style about 0.3–0.5 mm (0.012–0.020 in) long with three spreading red limbs 1.6–2.2 mm (0.063–0.087 in) long, each with two or three lobes 1.2–1.6 mm (0.047–0.063 in) long. Flowering has been observed in February, from May to October and in December and the seeds are mottled light brown 4.3–5.5 mm (0.17–0.22 in) long and 2.5–3.8 mm (0.098–0.150 in) wide.

== Taxonomy ==
Bertya rotundifolia was first formally described in 1863 by Ferdinand von Mueller in his Fragmenta Phytographiae Australiae from specimens collected near the Cygnet River on Kangaroo Island by Frederick George Waterhouse. The specific epithet (rotundifolia) means 'round- or circular-leaved'.

== Distribution and habitat ==
This species of Bertya is confined to the Kangaroo Island where it grows in coastal shrubland or woodland on sandy soil.
