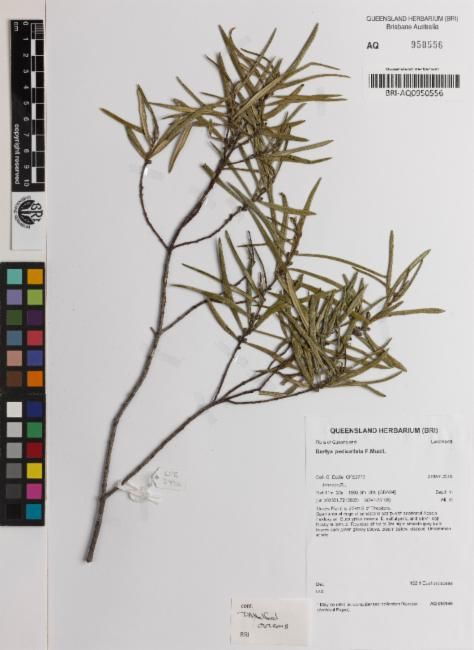
- Isotype in the Queensland Herbarium

Conservation status
- Near Threatened (NCA)

Scientific classification
- Kingdom: Plantae
- Clade: Tracheophytes
- Clade: Angiosperms
- Clade: Eudicots
- Clade: Rosids
- Order: Malpighiales
- Family: Euphorbiaceae
- Genus: Bertya
- Species: B. pedicellata

Binomial name
- Bertya pedicellata F.Muell.
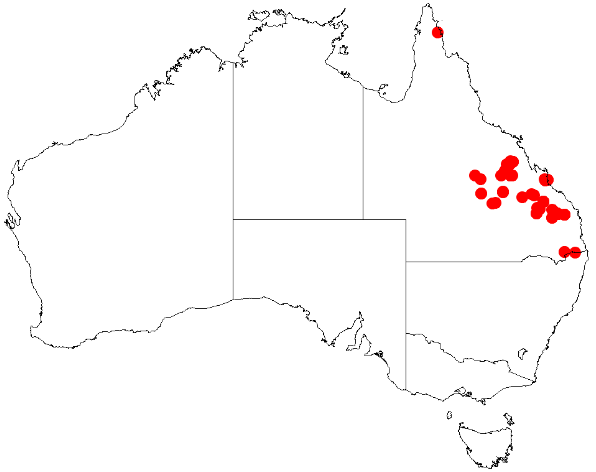
- Occurrence data from the Australasian Virtual Herbarium

Synonyms
- Bertya glabrescens (C.T.White) Guymer; Bertya oleifolia var. glabrescens C.T.White

= Bertya pedicellata =

Species of flowering plant

Bertya pedicellata is a species of flowering plant in the family Euphorbiaceae and is endemic to Queensland. It is a shrub with many branches, linear leaves, separate male and female flowers, male flowers with 55 to 70 stamens, female flowers with a sparsely hairy ovary, and narrowly elliptic capsules usually with a single seed.

== Description ==
Bertya pedicellata is a shrub that typically grows to a height of up to 6 m (20 ft) and has many branches covered with white, star-shaped hairs, and most parts of the plant sticky. The leaves are linear to elliptic or egg-shaped with the narrower end towards the base, 40–92 mm (1.6–3.6 in) long and 3–10 mm (0.12–0.39 in) wide, the edges of the leaves curved downwards or sometimes rolled under. The flowers are more or less sessile or on a peduncle up to 6 mm (0.24 in) long. The male flowers are 5–8 mm (0.20–0.31 in) long with 55 to 70 stamens. Each female flowers is on a pedicel 1.5–3 mm (0.059–0.118 in) long and has narrowly egg-shaped sepals and an ovary usually with scattered star-shaped hairs, or sometimes glabrous. Flowering occurs from March to November and the fruit is narrowly elliptic or narrowly oval, 8.5–11.3 mm (0.33–0.44 in) long, usually with a single seed.

== Taxonomy ==
Bertya pedicellata was first formally described in 1864 by Ferdinand von Mueller in his Fragmenta Phytographiae Australiae from specimens collected near Rockhampton by Anthelme Thozet. The specific epithet (pedicellata) means 'pedicellate'.

== Distribution and habitat ==
This species of Bertya grows on skeletal soils on rocky hillsides in forest, woodland, shrubland, heathland and vine thickets, mainly between Aramac, Rockhampton and Biggenden in Queensland.

== Conservation status ==
Bertya pedicellata is listed as "near threatened" under the Queensland Government Nature Conservation Act 1992.
