= Bertya ernestiana =

Conservation status
- Vulnerable (NCA)

Scientific classification
- Kingdom: Plantae
- Clade: Tracheophytes
- Clade: Angiosperms
- Clade: Eudicots
- Clade: Rosids
- Order: Malpighiales
- Family: Euphorbiaceae
- Genus: Bertya
- Species: B. ernestiana

Binomial name
- Bertya ernestiana Halford & R.J.F.Hend.
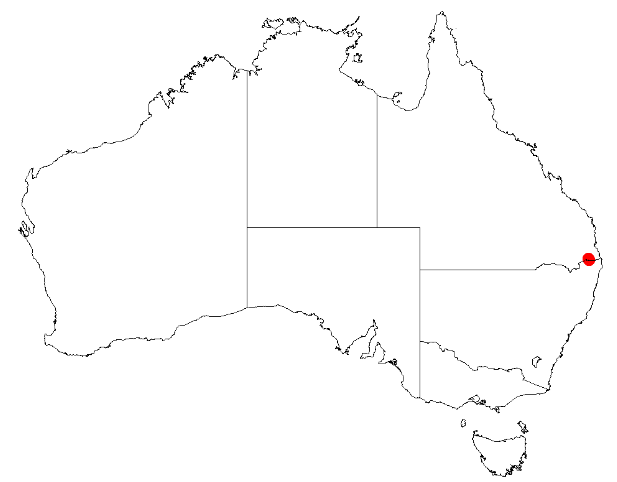
- Occurrence data from the Australasian Virtual Herbarium

Species of flowering plant

Bertya ernestiana is a species of flowering plant in the family Euphorbiaceae and is endemic to Queensland. It is a shrub with many branches, linear leaves, flowers borne singly in leaf axils or on the ends of branches, and narrowly elliptic capsules with a light brown seed.

== Description ==
Bertya ernestiana is a monoecious shrub that typically grows to a height of up to 1.5 m (4 ft 11 in) and has many branches. Its leaves are linear to elliptic, mostly 40–80 mm (1.6–3.1 in) long and 3–6 mm (0.12–0.24 in) wide on a petiole 2–4 mm (0.079–0.157 in) long. The upper surface of the leaves is green glabrous, and the lower surface is white and densely covered with star-shaped hairs. The flowers are borne singly in leaf axils or on the ends of short side-branches on a peduncle 1–5 mm (0.039–0.197 in) long. There are four to six linear or narrowly triangular bracts 2–10 mm (0.079–0.394 in) long and 0.3–1.3 mm (0.012–0.051 in) wide. Male flowers are sessile with five egg-shaped or oblong sepal lobes 5.2–5.5 mm (0.20–0.22 in) long and 2.6–3.5 mm (0.10–0.14 in) wide and have about 60 stamens. Female flowers are borne on a pedicel 1.0–2.1 mm (0.039–0.083 in) long, the five sepal lobes light green and narrowly oblong, 3.7–4.5 mm (0.15–0.18 in) long and 1.0–1.5 mm (0.039–0.059 in) wide. Female flowers usually have no petals, the ovary is glabrous and smooth, and the style is 0.2–0.3 mm (0.0079–0.0118 in) long with three spreading yellowish-green to red limbs 2.9–4.1 mm (0.11–0.16 in) long, each with three to five lobes 3.0–4.1 mm (0.12–0.16 in) long. Flowering has been recorded in April, July and September, and the fruit is a narrowly elliptic to narrowly oval capsule 7.5–10 mm (0.30–0.39 in) long and 3.8–4.2 mm (0.15–0.17 in) wide with a single oblong to elliptic, light brown seed about 6 mm (0.24 in) long and 3.2 mm (0.13 in) wide with a creamy-white caruncle.

== Taxonomy ==
Bertya ernestiana was first formally described in 2002 by David Halford and Rodney John Francis Henderson in the journal Austrobaileya from specimens collected by Halford on Mount Ernest in Mount Barney National Park in 1999. The specific epithet (ernestiana) refers to the mountain where the type specimens were collected.

== Distribution and habitat ==
This species of Bertya is only known from Mount Ernest and Mount May in south-east Queensland, where it grows on steep rocky slopes in heath or open eucalypt forest with a heathy understorey.

== Conservation status ==
Bertya ernestiana is listed as "vulnerable" under the Queensland Government Nature Conservation Act 1992. The main threat to the species is inappropriate fire regimes.
