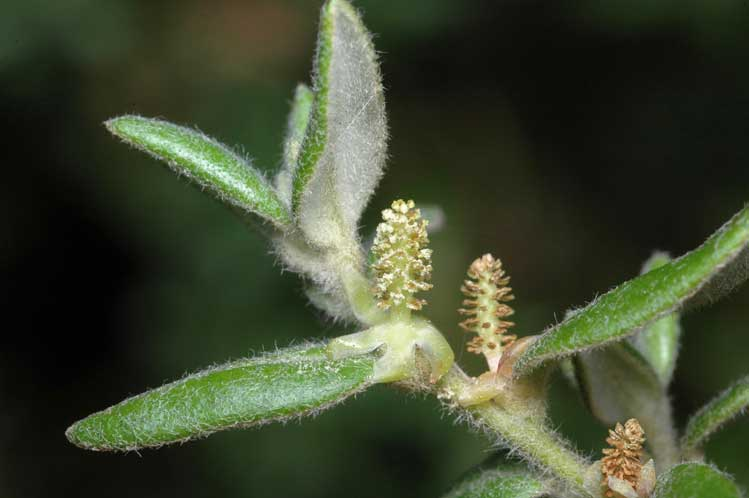
- In the Australian National Botanic Gardens

Scientific classification
- Kingdom: Plantae
- Clade: Tracheophytes
- Clade: Angiosperms
- Clade: Eudicots
- Clade: Rosids
- Order: Malpighiales
- Family: Euphorbiaceae
- Genus: Bertya
- Species: B. sharpeana

Binomial name
- Bertya sharpeana Guymer
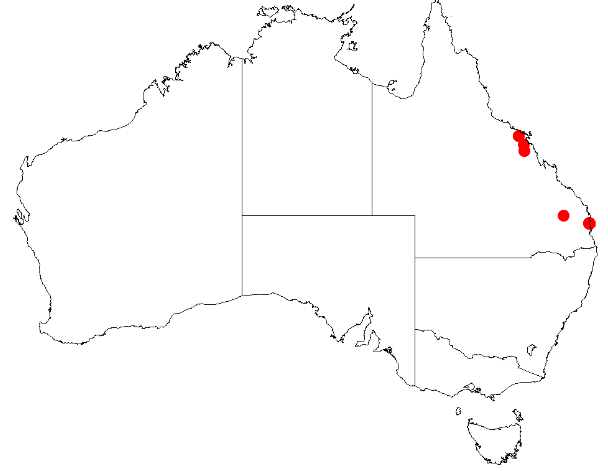
- Occurrence data from the Australasian Virtual Herbarium

= Bertya sharpeana =

Species of flowering plant

Bertya sharpeana, commonly known as Mount Coolum bertya, is a species of flowering plant in the family Euphorbiaceae and is endemic to Queensland. It is a monoecious, or sometimes dioecious shrub, with narrowly egg-shaped to egg-shaped leaves, and sessile flowers usually borne singly in leaf axils.

== Description ==
Bertya sharpeana is a monoecious or sometimes dioecious shrub that typically grows to a height of up to 4 m (13 ft) with densely hairy branchlets at first, later glabrous. The leaves are narrowly egg-shaped to egg-shaped, 8–22 mm (0.31–0.87 in) long and 3–10 mm (0.12–0.39 in) wide on a petiole 1–4 mm (0.039–0.157 in) long. The upper surface of the leaves is green, and the lower surface white and densely covered with star-shaped hairs.

The flowers are sessile, the male flowers with five white elliptic to oblong sepal lobes 2.5–4 mm (0.098–0.157 in) long and 1.5–2 mm (0.059–0.079 in) wide and 47 to 53 stamens. Female flowers have five light green, egg-shaped to oblong sepal lobes 1.0–2.7 mm (0.039–0.106 in) long, 0.8–1.8 mm (0.031–0.071 in) wide and there are usually no petals. The ovary is nearly spherical, about 0.8–0.9 mm (0.031–0.035 in) long and wide and covered with star-shaped hairs, the style about 0.1 mm (0.0039 in) long with three spreading red to maroon limbs 1.1–4.5 mm (0.043–0.177 in) long, each with two to four lobes 0.6–3.5 mm (0.024–0.138 in) long. Flowering has been observed from June to September and in November and the seeds are mottled light brown 3.1–4.5 mm (0.12–0.18 in) long and 2.0–2.9 mm (0.079–0.114 in) wide.

== Taxonomy ==
Bertya sharpeana was first formally described in 1988 by Gordon Guymer in the journal Austrobaileya from specimens collected on the south-east part of Mount Coolum in 1982. The specific epithet (sharpe) honours Philip Ridley Sharpe who brought the attention of the plant to Guymer.

== Distribution and habitat ==
This species of Bertya usually grows in heath, sometimes in open forest, woodland and the margins of rainforest near Bowen, Mackay and Mount Coolum, and occurs in Eungella, Homevale and Mount Coolum National Parks.

== Conservation status ==
This species is listed as "near threatened" under the Queensland Government Nature Conservation Act 1992.
