= Bertya grampiana =

Scientific classification
- Kingdom: Plantae
- Clade: Tracheophytes
- Clade: Angiosperms
- Clade: Eudicots
- Clade: Rosids
- Order: Malpighiales
- Family: Euphorbiaceae
- Genus: Bertya
- Species: B. grampiana

Binomial name
- Bertya grampiana Halford & R.J.F.Hend.
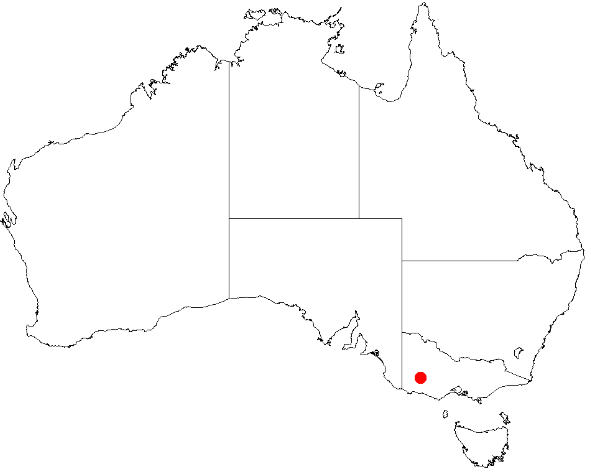
- Occurrence data from the Australasian Virtual Herbarium

Species of flowering plant

Bertya grampiana, commonly known as mountain Bertya, is a species of flowering plant in the family Euphorbiaceae and is endemic to Victoria. It is an erect, monoecious shrub with strap-like to linear or narrowly elliptic leaves with the narrower end towards the base, flowers borne singly in leaf axils, and oval to narrowly elliptic capsules with a mottled greyish-white to light brown seed.

== Description ==
Bertya grampiana is an erect, monoecious shrub that typically grows to a height of 2–4 m (6 ft 7 in – 13 ft 1 in) and has many branches. Its leaves are strap-like to linear or narrowly elliptic with the narrower end towards the base, mostly 19–39 mm (0.75–1.54 in) long and 2.5–4.4 mm (0.098–0.173 in) wide on a petiole 0.9–1.5 mm (0.035–0.059 in) long. The upper surface of the leaves is green and glabrous, the lower surface is white and densely covered with star-shaped hairs. The flowers are borne singly in leaf axils or on the ends of short side-branches on a peduncle 1–4 mm (0.039–0.157 in) long. There are five to seven narrowly egg-shaped or narrowly triangular bracts 1–3.5 mm (0.039–0.138 in) long and 0.3–1.5 mm (0.012–0.059 in) wide. Male flowers are sessile or on a pedicel up to 0.5 mm (0.020 in) long with five light green, egg-shaped sepal lobes 4.7–5.1 mm (0.19–0.20 in) long and 2.4–2.6 mm (0.094–0.102 in) wide and have 43 to 49 stamens. Female flowers are borne on a pedicel 0.3–1.1 mm (0.012–0.043 in) long, the five sepal lobes light green and narrowly egg-shaped or narrowly triangular, 2.8–3.2 mm (0.11–0.13 in) long and 0.8–1.2 mm (0.031–0.047 in) wide. Female flowers have no petals, the ovary is mostly glabrous, and the style is 0.2–0.4 mm (0.0079–0.0157 in) long with three spreading red limbs 1.8–3.1 mm (0.071–0.122 in) long, each with two to five lobes 0.9–1.5 mm (0.035–0.059 in) long. Flowering has been recorded between September and February, and the fruit is a narrowly elliptic capsule 6.7–7.3 mm (0.26–0.29 in) long and 3.2–3.62 mm (0.126–0.143 in) wide, usually with a single oblong, greyish-white to light brown seed 5.5–5.7 mm (0.22–0.22 in) long and 2.6–2.9 mm (0.10–0.11 in) wide mottled with dark brown, with a yellowish-white caruncle.

== Taxonomy ==
Bertya grampiana was first formally described in 2002 by David Halford and Rodney John Francis Henderson in the journal Austrobaileya from specimens collected by James Hamlyn Willis on the western foot of the Victoria Range in Grampians National Park in 1974. The specific epithet (grampiana) refers to the Grampians National Park where this species occurs.

== Distribution and habitat ==
This species of Bertya is restricted to the Victoria Range in Grampians National Park, where it grows in shrubland near watercourses in sandy soil over sandstone.

== Conservation status ==
Bertya grampiana is listed as "critically endangered" under the Victorian Government Flora and Fauna Guarantee Act 1988.
