= Bertya calycina =

Conservation status
- Vulnerable (NCA)

Scientific classification
- Kingdom: Plantae
- Clade: Tracheophytes
- Clade: Angiosperms
- Clade: Eudicots
- Clade: Rosids
- Order: Malpighiales
- Family: Euphorbiaceae
- Genus: Bertya
- Species: B. calycina

Binomial name
- Bertya calycina Halford & R.J.F.Hend.
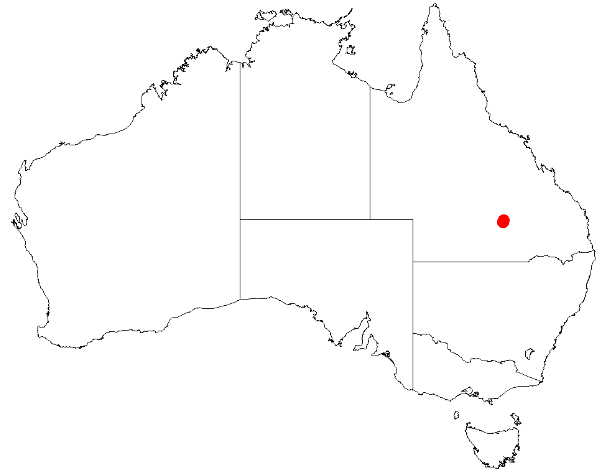
- Occurrence data from the Australasian Virtual Herbarium

Species of flowering plant

Bertya calycina is a species of flowering plant in the family Euphorbiaceae and is endemic to Queensland. It is a shrub with many branches, linear leaves, flowers borne singly or in pairs in leaf axils or on the ends of branches, and narrowly elliptic capsules with a dark brown seed.

== Description ==
Bertya calycina is a monoecious or dioecious shrub that typically grows to a height of up to 4 m (13 ft) and has many sticky branches. Its leaves are linear, mostly 19–42 mm (0.75–1.65 in) long and 1.2–3.1 mm (0.047–0.122 in) wide on a petiole 0.6–1.3 mm (0.024–0.051 in) long. The upper surface of the leaves is green and the lower surface is white and densely covered with star-shaped hairs. The flowers are borne singly or in pairs in leaf axils or on the ends of branches and are sessile or on a peduncle 4–8 mm (0.16–0.31 in) long. There are two to eight, narrowly egg-shaped to oblong bracts 2.1–3.7 mm (0.083–0.146 in) long and 0.9–1.2 mm (0.035–0.047 in) wide. Male flowers are sessile with five elliptic sepal lobes 2.7–3.2 mm (0.11–0.13 in) long and 4.2–5.1 mm (0.17–0.20 in) wide and 56 to 68 stamens. Female flowers are borne on a pedicel 2.5–3.2 mm (0.098–0.126 in) long, the five sepal lobes pale yellowish-red and oblong, 3.8–6.4 mm (0.15–0.25 in) long and 1.5–2.5 mm (0.059–0.098 in) wide. Female flowers usually have no petals, the ovary is densely covered with star-shaped hairs and the style is 0.4–0.5 mm (0.016–0.020 in) long with three spreading dark red limbs 3.1–6.2 mm (0.12–0.24 in) long with three to five lobes 1.7–3.5 mm (0.067–0.138 in) long. Flowering has been recorded in August, October and November, and the fruit is a narrowly elliptic capsule 9.0–10.3 mm (0.35–0.41 in) long and 5.0–6.1 mm (0.20–0.24 in) wide with a single oblong, dark brown seed 6.5–7.5 mm (0.26–0.30 in) long and 3.8–4.0 mm (0.15–0.16 in) wide with a creamy-white caruncle.

== Taxonomy ==
Bertya calycina was first formally described in 2002 by David Halford and Rodney John Francis Henderson in the journal Austrobaileya from specimens collected by Henderson about 30 km (19 mi) north-east of Morven in 1990. The specific epithet (calycina) means 'with a well-developed calyx'.

== Distribution and habitat ==
This species of Bertya grows in ironbark-bloodwood woodland on sandy or loamy soils in gullies of a sandstone plateau in an area of sandstone outcrops in the Chesterton Range in south-west Queensland.

== Conservation status ==
Bertya calycina is listed as "vulnerable" under the Queensland Government Nature Conservation Act 1992.
