= Bertya lapicola =

Scientific classification
- Kingdom: Plantae
- Clade: Tracheophytes
- Clade: Angiosperms
- Clade: Eudicots
- Clade: Rosids
- Order: Malpighiales
- Family: Euphorbiaceae
- Genus: Bertya
- Species: B. lapicola

Binomial name
- Bertya lapicola Halford & R.J.F.Hend.
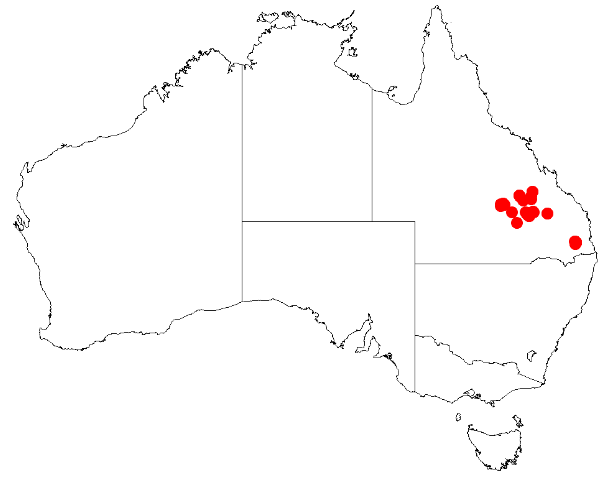
- Occurrence data from the Australasian Virtual Herbarium

Species of flowering plant

Bertya lapicola is a species of flowering plant in the family Euphorbiaceae and is endemic to Queensland. It is a monoecious shrub with many branches, linear leaves, flowers borne singly in leaf axils or on the ends of branches, and narrowly oval or pear-shaped capsules with a light to dark brown seed.

== Description ==
Bertya lapicola is a monoecious shrub that typically grows to a height of up to 2 m (6 ft 7 in) and has many branches with a thin, sticky film on most parts. Its leaves are linear, 15–55 mm (0.59–2.17 in) long and 1.3–1.9 mm (0.051–0.075 in) wide on a petiole 0.9–1.2 mm (0.035–0.047 in) long. The upper surface of the leaves is glabrous, green and smooth, and the lower surface is white and densely covered with star-shaped hairs. The flowers are usually borne singly in leaf axils or on the end of a short side branches on a peduncle 1–6 mm (0.039–0.236 in) long. There are two to five linear or strap-like bracts 0.8–2.6 mm (0.031–0.102 in) long and 0.4–0.5 mm (0.016–0.020 in) wide. Male flowers are sessile or on a pedicel up to 2 mm (0.079 in) long with five light green elliptic or oblong sepal lobes 4.0–5.1 mm (0.16–0.20 in) long and 2.1–3.5 mm (0.083–0.138 in) wide and 55 to 72 stamens. Female flowers are on pedicels 2.8–4.0 mm (0.11–0.16 in) long, the five sepal lobes light green, linear, 1.8–5.5 mm (0.071–0.217 in) long and 0.6–1.1 mm (0.024–0.043 in) wide. Female flowers have no petals, the ovary is glabrous, and the style is 0.8–1.3 mm (0.031–0.051 in) long with three ascending red limbs 3.5–6 mm (0.14–0.24 in) long, each with two or three lobes 1.5–4.1 mm (0.059–0.161 in) long. Flowering mainly occurs from June to September, and the fruit is a narrowly oval or pear-shaped capsule, 8.5–12.0 mm (0.33–0.47 in) long and 4.0–5.5 mm (0.16–0.22 in) wide with a single oblong or elliptic, light to dark brown seed 5.4–6.9 mm (0.21–0.27 in) long and 2.9–3.7 mm (0.11–0.15 in) wide with a creamy-white caruncle.

== Taxonomy ==
Bertya lapicola was first formally described in 2002 by David Halford and Rodney John Francis Henderson in the journal Austrobaileya from specimens collected along Goldmine Road 12 km (7.5 mi) north of Helidon in 1992. The specific epithet (lapicola) means 'stone-dweller', referring to the rocky sandstone habitat of this species.

In the same edition of Austrobaileya, Halford and Henderson described two subspecies of H. lapicola, and the names are accepted by the Australian Plant Census:

- Bertya lapicola subsp. brevifolia Halford & R.J.F.Hend. has leaves 15–30 mm (0.59–1.18 in) long, the peduncles of male flowers stout and 1–4 mm (0.039–0.157 in) long.
- Bertya lapicola Halford & R.J.F.Hend. subsp. lapicola has leaves 35–55 mm (1.4–2.2 in) long, the peduncles of male flowers slender and 4–6 mm (0.16–0.24 in) long.

== Distribution and habitat ==
This species of Bertya confined to south-east Queensland, where the subspecies have disjunct distributions. Subspecies brevifolia grows in open forest or woodland on shallow sandy soil on sandstone outcrops in the Carnarvon and Expedition Ranges in central Queensland, but subsp. lapicola grows in open forest communities and is confined to sandstone hills north of Helidon in south-east Queensland.

== Conservation status ==
Both subspecies of B. lapicola are listed as of "least concern" under the Queensland Government Nature Conservation Act 1992.
