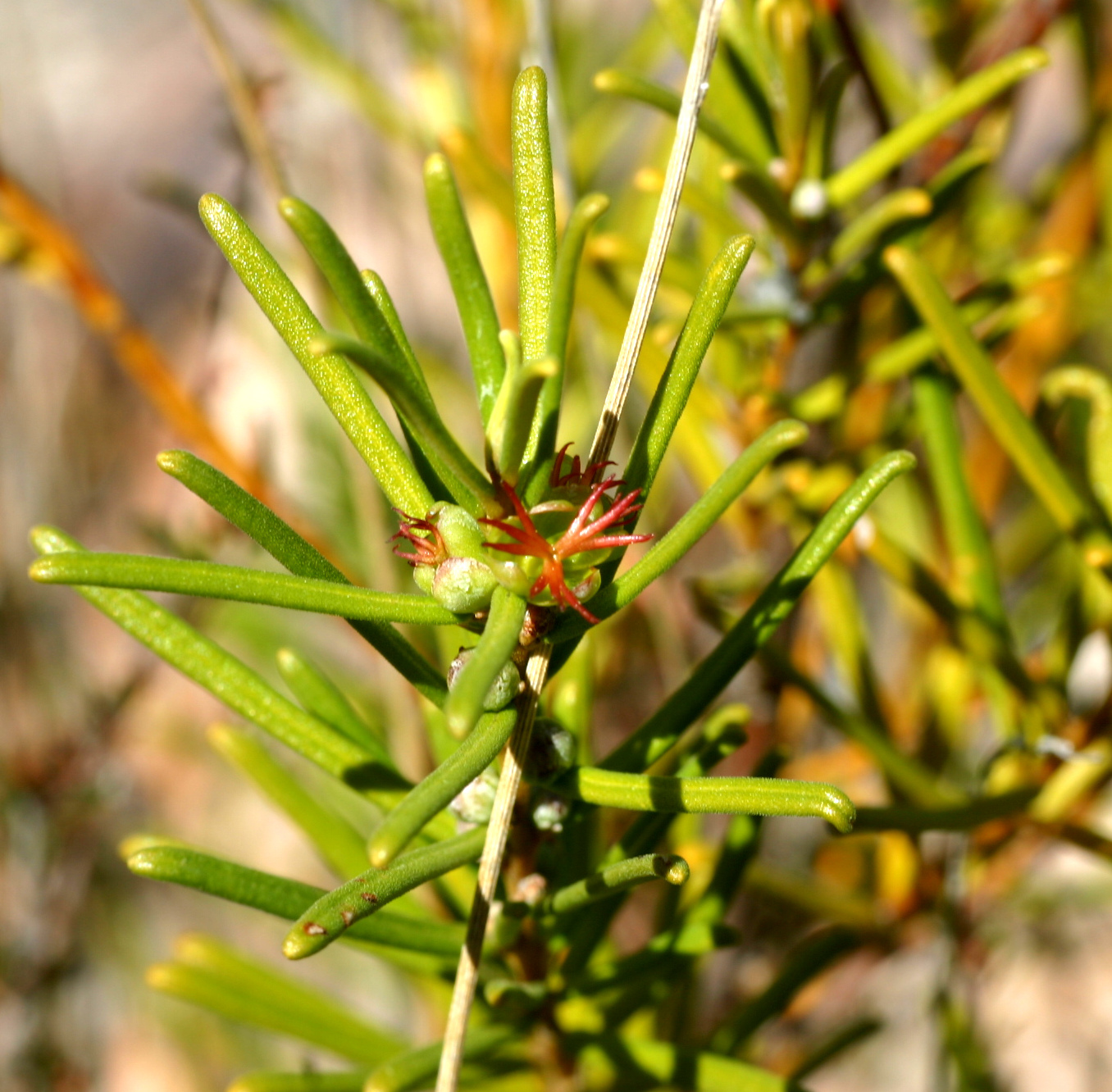
- In Girraween National Park

Scientific classification
- Kingdom: Plantae
- Clade: Tracheophytes
- Clade: Angiosperms
- Clade: Eudicots
- Clade: Rosids
- Order: Malpighiales
- Family: Euphorbiaceae
- Genus: Bertya
- Species: B. recurvata

Binomial name
- Bertya recurvata Halford & R.J.F.Hend.

= Bertya recurvata =

Species of flowering plant

Bertya recurvata is a species of flowering plant in the family Euphorbiaceae and is endemic to the far south-east of Queensland. It is a monoecious or dioecious shrub with many branches, linear or strap-like leaves, flowers usually borne singly in leaf axils, and elliptic capsules.

== Description ==
Bertya recurvata is a monoecious or dioecious shrub that has many branches and typically grows to a height of up to 1.5 m (4 ft 11 in). Its leaves are linear or strap-like, 15–27 mm (0.59–1.06 in) long and 1.5–2.6 mm (0.059–0.102 in) wide on a petiole 1.0–1.5 mm (0.039–0.059 in) long. The edges of the leaves are turned down or rolled under, the upper surface glabrous and green, and the lower surface white and densely covered with star-shaped hairs. The flowers are usually borne singly or sometimes in pairs in leaf axils on a peduncle up to 1 mm (0.039 in) long. There are three to eight narrowly egg-shaped or narrowly triangular outer bracts 2.7–3.5 mm (0.11–0.14 in) long and 1.0–2.6 mm (0.039–0.102 in) wide, the lower bracts slightly shorter. Male flowers are sessile with five oblong or elliptic sepal lobes 4.0–5.3 mm (0.16–0.21 in) long and 3.3–4.2 mm (0.13–0.17 in) wide and 40 to 80 stamens. Female flowers are also sessile, the five sepal lobes linear, 4.7–5.1 mm (0.19–0.20 in) long and have no petals. The ovary is oval to more or less spherical and glabrous, the style 0.5–0.8 mm (0.020–0.031 in) long with three spreading red limbs 4–6 mm (0.16–0.24 in) long, each with two to four lobes 3.0–4.5 mm (0.12–0.18 in) long. Flowering has been observed between July to October, and the fruit is an elliptic capsule, 7.5–8.2 mm (0.30–0.32 in) long and 3.5–5.1 mm (0.14–0.20 in) wide with one or two dark brown to reddish seeds with a creamy white elaiosome.

== Taxonomy ==
Bertya recurvata was first formally described in 2002 by David Halford and Rodney John Francis Henderson in the journal Austrobaileya from specimens collected near Wyberba in 1993. The specific epithet (recurvata) means 'curved backwards', referring to the tips of the leaves.

== Distribution and habitat ==
This species of Bertya is confined to the Stanthorpe-Wallangarra area of south-east Queensland where it grows in shallow sandy soils in heath, shrubland, woodland or forest.

== Conservation status ==
Bertya recurvata is listed as "endangered" under the Queensland Government Nature Conservation Act 1992.
