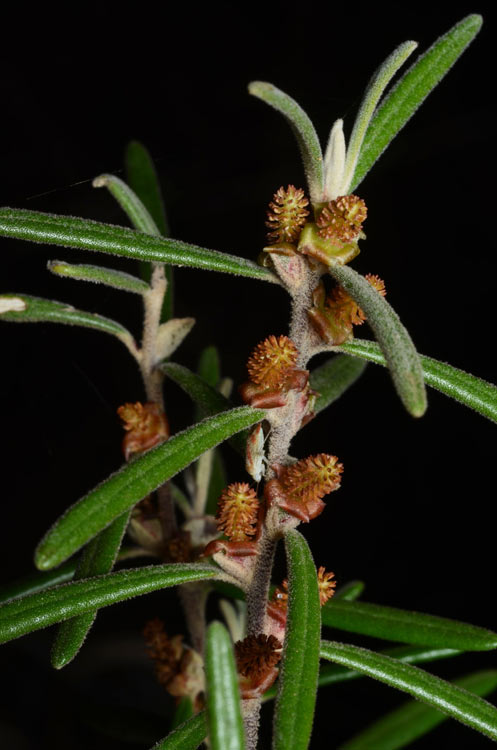
- In Carnarvon National Park

Scientific classification
- Kingdom: Plantae
- Clade: Tracheophytes
- Clade: Angiosperms
- Clade: Eudicots
- Clade: Rosids
- Order: Malpighiales
- Family: Euphorbiaceae
- Genus: Bertya
- Species: B. oleifolia

Binomial name
- Bertya oleifolia Planch.

Synonyms
- List: Bertya mitchelli Müll.Arg. orth. var.; Bertya mitchellii (Sond.) Müll.Arg.; Bertya mitchellii var. genuina Grüning; Bertya mitchellii (Sond.) Müll.Arg. var. mitchellii; Bertya oleaefolia Planch. orth. var.; Bertya oleifolia Planch. var. oleifolia; Bertya polymorpha Baill. nom. illeg.; Bertya polymorpha var. genuina Baill. nom. inval.; Bertya polymorpha Baill. var. polymorpha nom. illeg.; Ricinocarpos mitchellii Sond.; Ricinocarpus mitchelli Sond. orth. var.

= Bertya oleifolia =

Species of flowering plant

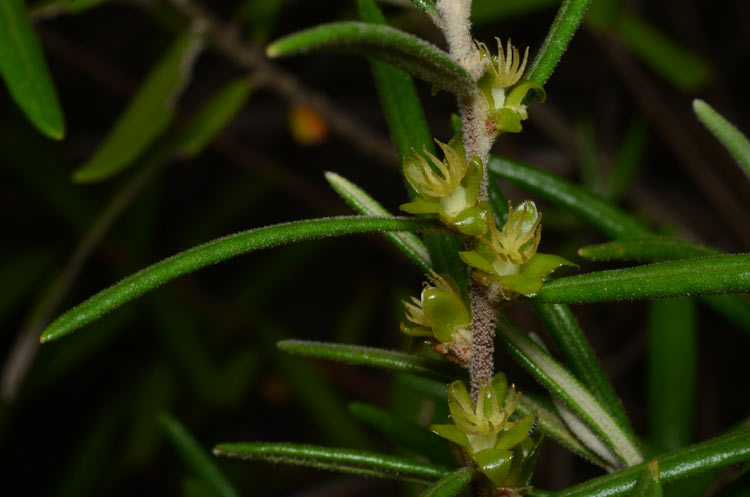
Female flowers

Bertya oleifolia is a species of flowering plant in the family Euphorbiaceae and is endemic to eastern Australia. It is an erect shrub with linear to lance-shaped or narrowly elliptic leaves, separate male and female flowers, and elliptic capsules densely covered with star-shaped hairs.

== Description ==
Bertya oleifolia is a shrub that typically grows to a height of up to 2.5 m (8 ft 2 in), its young branchlets densely covered with white, star-shaped hairs. The leaves are linear to lance-shaped with the narrower end towards the base, or narrowly elliptic, 25–54 mm (0.98–2.13 in) long and 2–8 mm (0.079–0.315 in) wide with the edges curved dow or rolled under. Separate male and female flowers are borne on a peduncle up to 1.5 mm (0.059 in) long, the male flowers 45 to 75 stamens. Female flowers are sessile, with narrowly egg-shaped sepals 3.3–4.5 mm (0.13–0.18 in) long and a densely hairy ovary. Flowering occurs from May to November, and the fruit is elliptic, 6.9–8.5 mm (0.27–0.33 in) long with a single seed.

== Taxonomy ==
Bertya oleifolia was first formally described in 1845 by Jules Émile Planchon in Hooker's London Journal of Botany from specimens collected by Allan Cunningham. The specific epithet (oleifolia) means 'olive-tree leaved'.

== Distribution and habitat ==
This species of Bertya grows on sandstone in shrubland, woodland and open forest, often in rocky places, between Jericho in Queensland and Ashford, in northern New South Wales, and between Rylstone and Nowra further south.

== Conservation status ==
Bertya oleifolia is listed as of "least concern" under the Queensland Government Nature Conservation Act 1992.
