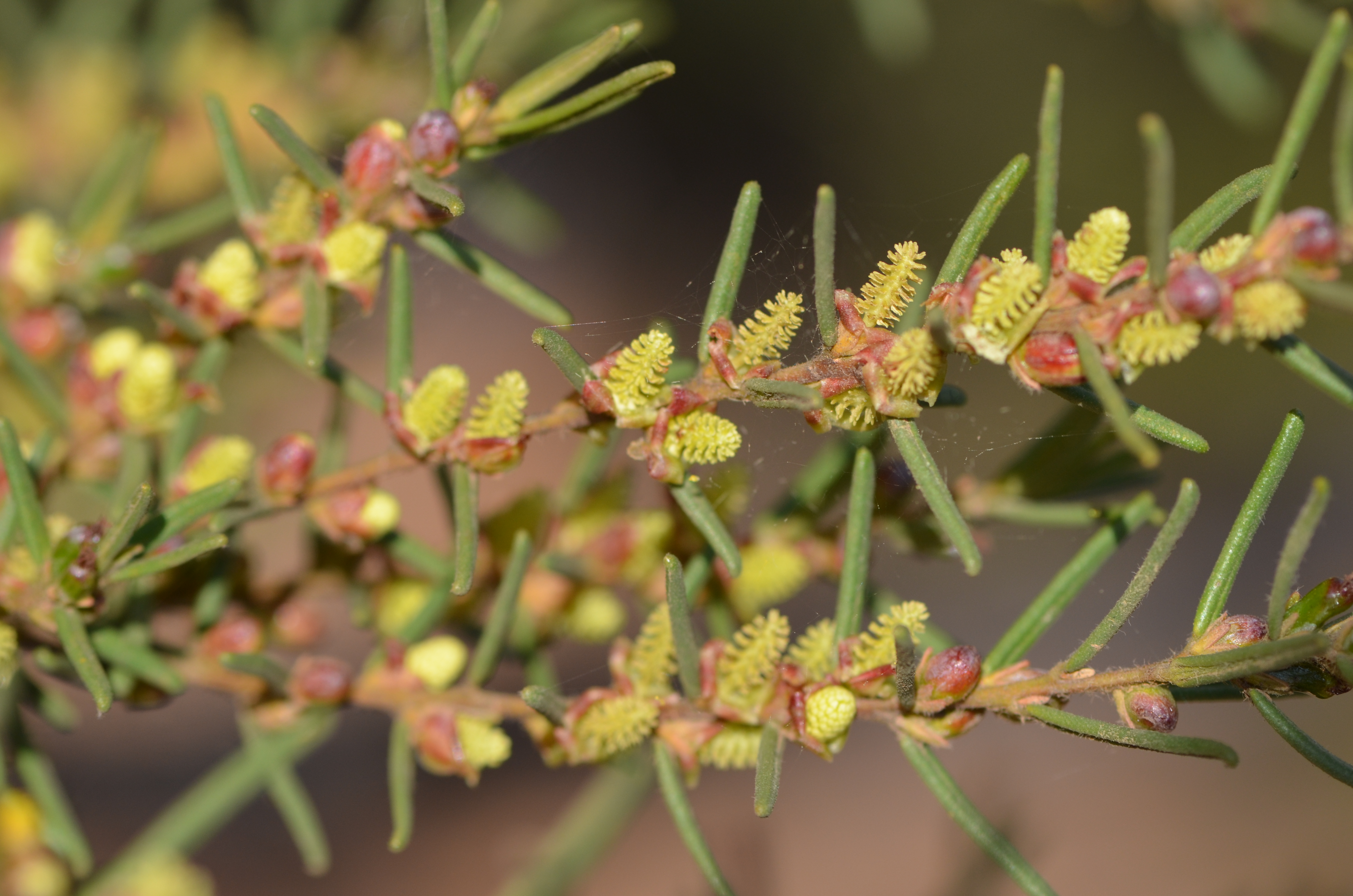
- In the Pilliga forest

Scientific classification
- Kingdom: Plantae
- Clade: Tracheophytes
- Clade: Angiosperms
- Clade: Eudicots
- Clade: Rosids
- Order: Malpighiales
- Family: Euphorbiaceae
- Genus: Bertya
- Species: B. gummifera

Binomial name
- Bertya gummifera Planch.
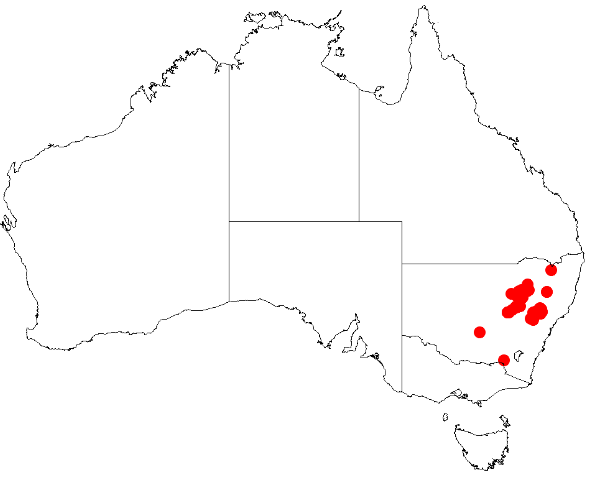
- Occurrence data from Australasian Virtual Herbarium

Synonyms
- Bertya gummifera var. genuina Müll.Arg. nom. inval.; Bertya gummifera Planch. var. gummifera; Bertya neglecta Dümmer; Bertya polymorpha β mitchelliana Baill.

= Bertya gummifera =

Species of flowering plant

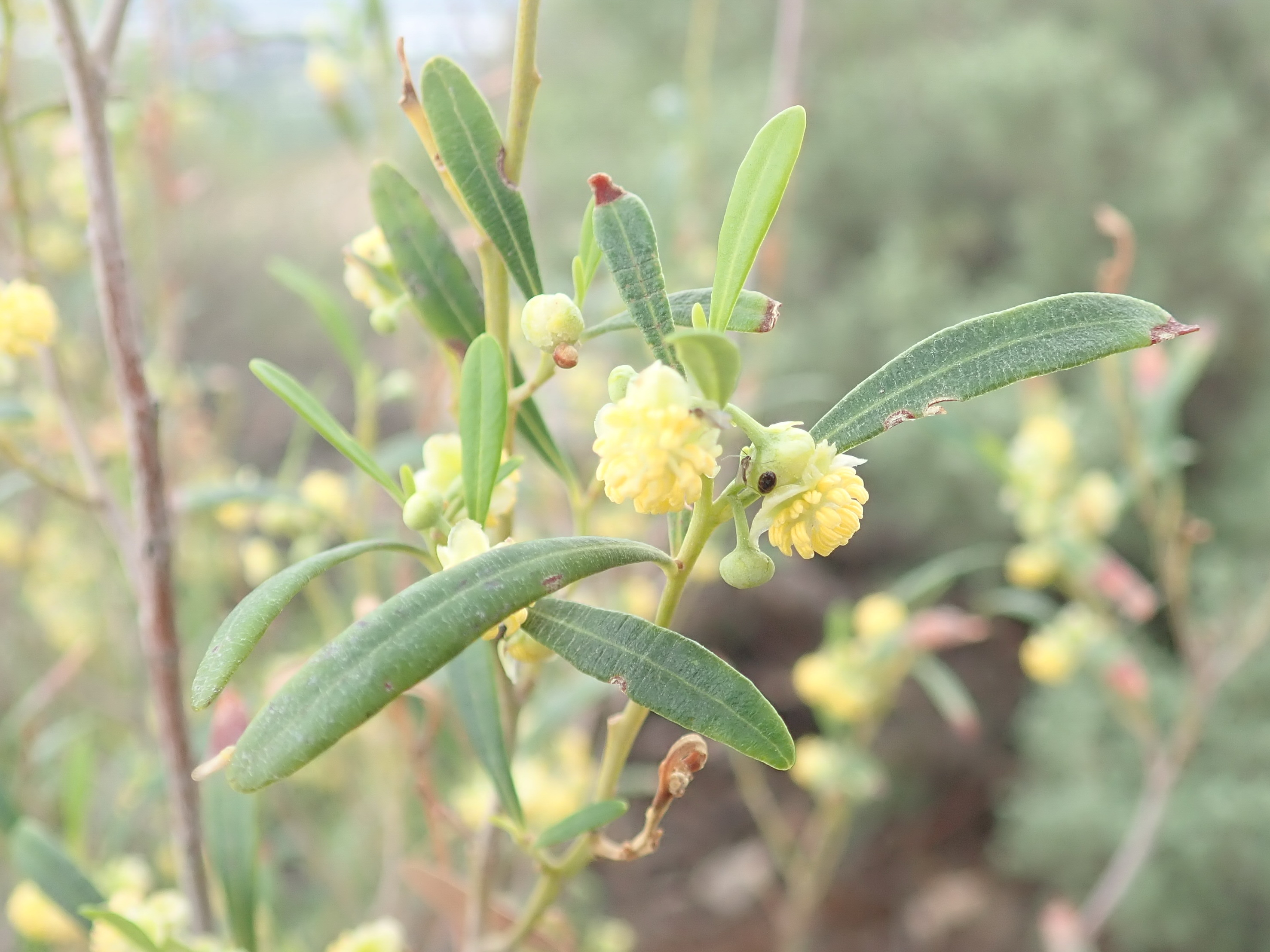
Male flowers

Bertya gummifera is a species of flowering plant in the family Euphorbiaceae and is endemic to New South Wales. It is a sticky shrub with linear leaves, the flowers crowded along the stems, male flowers with 46 to 61 stamens, and female flowers with a glabrous ovary and elliptic capsules.

== Description ==
Bertya gummifera is a sticky shrub that typically grows to a height of 1–2 m (3 ft 3 in – 6 ft 7 in), the young growth covered long whitish hairs but later rough or glabrous. The leaves are linear, 10–50 mm (0.39–1.97 in) long and 0.9–1.5 mm (0.035–0.059 in) wide, with the edges curved down or rolled under, covering the lower surface. The flowers are borne singly or in pairs on a peduncle 1.0–1.5 mm (0.039–0.059 in) long, male flowers on a pedicel up to 0.8 mm (0.031 in) long with five sepal lobes 4.5–5.4 mm (0.18–0.21 in) long and 3–4.3 mm (0.12–0.17 in) wide. Female flowers are sessile, usually with five elliptic or egg-shaped sepal lobes 3.8–6.2 mm (0.15–0.24 in) long and 2.2–3.5 mm (0.087–0.138 in) long. Male flowers have 46 to 61 stamens and female flowers have rudimentary petals, a glabrous ovary, and a style 0.5–2.0 mm (0.020–0.079 in) long with three spreading pink to red limbs 4.9–8.2 mm (0.19–0.32 in) long, each with three or four lobes 3.8–6.2 mm (0.15–0.24 in) long. Flowering has been recorded from May to December and the fruit is an elliptic capsule 6.9–9.2 mm (0.27–0.36 in) long and 3.0–4.1 mm (0.12–0.16 in) wide, usually with a single oblong, dark brown seed 5.3–7 mm (0.21–0.28 in) long and 3.2–3.5 mm (0.13–0.14 in) wide with a creamy-white caruncle.

== Taxonomy ==
Bertya gummifera was first formally described in 1845 by Jules Émile Planchon in Hooker's London Journal of Botany from specimens collected by Allan Cunningham near Wellington.

== Distribution and habitat ==
This species of Bertya grows in a variety of drier habitats, including forest, woodland and open mallee in central New South Wales, mainly between Narrabri, Moonbi, Kandos and the Warrumbungles.
