= Bertya virgata =

Scientific classification
- Kingdom: Plantae
- Clade: Tracheophytes
- Clade: Angiosperms
- Clade: Eudicots
- Clade: Rosids
- Order: Malpighiales
- Family: Euphorbiaceae
- Genus: Bertya
- Species: B. virgata

Binomial name
- Bertya virgata (Ewart) Halford & R.J.F.Hend.
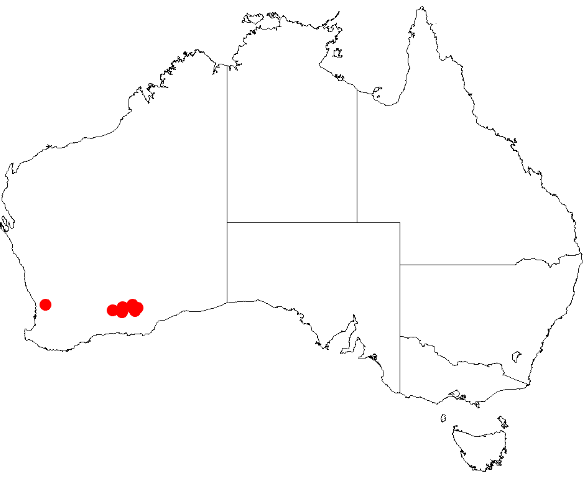
- Occurrence data from the Australasian Virtual Herbarium

Synonyms
- Bertya cupressoidea (Grüning) Airy Shaw; Bertya dimerostigma var. cupressoidea Grüning; Beyeria virgata Ewart

Species of flowering plant

Bertya virgata is a species of flowering plant in the family Euphorbiaceae and is endemic to Western Australia. It is a dioecious shrub with many branches, sessile, oblong leaves, and sessile flowers borne singly in leaf axils.

== Description ==
Bertya virgata is a dioecious shrub that typically grows to a height of up to 1.4 m (4 ft 7 in) and has many branches, and sticky young shoots. Its leaves are oblong, 1.5–3 mm (0.059–0.118 in) long and 0.8–1.3 mm (0.031–0.051 in) wide and sessile, or on a petiole up to 0.4 mm (0.016 in) long. The edges of the leaves are strongly rolled under, the upper surface green and glabrous, the lower surface concealed.

The flowers are borne singly leaf axils and sessile or on a peduncle up to 0.5 mm (0.020 in) long. There are four to eight oblong to linear bracts 1–2 mm (0.039–0.079 in) long and 0.3–0.8 mm (0.012–0.031 in) wide. Male flowers have five elliptic sepal lobes 2.7–4.0 mm (0.11–0.16 in) long and 1.0–3.7 mm (0.039–0.146 in) wide and about 26 stamens. Female flowers also have five egg-shaped to elliptic sepal lobes 2.1–2.3 mm (0.083–0.091 in) long and there are no petals. The ovary is oval and glabrous, the style 0.2–0.3 mm (0.0079–0.0118 in) long with three spreading limbs about 1.0 mm (0.039 in) long, each with two lobes 0.6–1.0 mm (0.024–0.039 in) long. Flowering has been observed in May, August and September and the capsules are elliptic, 3.9–4.5 mm (0.15–0.18 in) long and 3.2–3.7 mm (0.13–0.15 in) wide with a light brown, elliptic seed about 3.3 mm (0.13 in) long and 2.5 mm (0.098 in) wide.

== Taxonomy ==
This species was first formally described in 1921 by Alfred James Ewart who gave it the name Beyeria virgata in Proceedings of the Royal Society of Victoria from specimens collected "On Sand Hills near Lefroy in Western Australia" by Richard Helms on the Elder Exploring Expedition. In 2002, David Halford and Rodney John Francis Henderson transferred the species to Bertya as B. virgata in the journal Austrobaileya. The specific epithet (virgata) means 'virgate', referring to the long, slender but usually stiff twigs of this species.

== Distribution and habitat ==
This species of Bertya grows on sand dunes near salt lakes in open mallee, on sand or pebbly sandy clay between Coolgardie and Norseman in the Coolgardie and Mallee bioregions of Western Australia.

== Conservation status ==
Bertya virgata is listed as "not threatened" by the Government of Western Australia Department of Biodiversity, Conservation and Attractions
