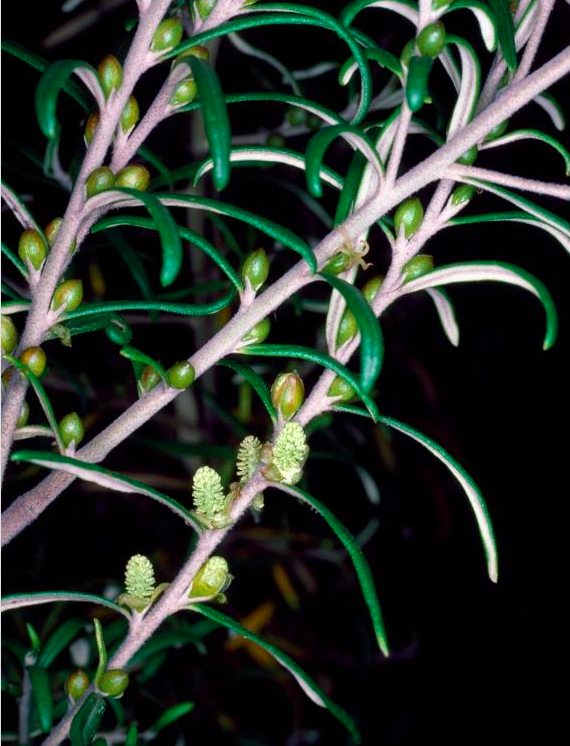
- In the ANBG

Scientific classification
- Kingdom: Plantae
- Clade: Tracheophytes
- Clade: Angiosperms
- Clade: Eudicots
- Clade: Rosids
- Order: Malpighiales
- Family: Euphorbiaceae
- Genus: Bertya
- Species: B. findlayi

Binomial name
- Bertya findlayi F.Muell.
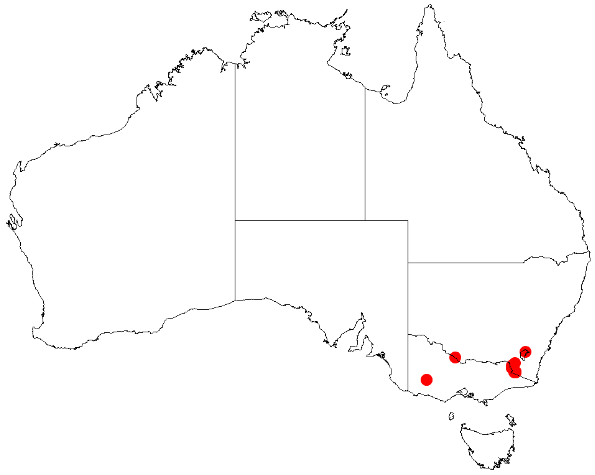
- Occurrence data from the Australasian Virtual Herbarium

= Bertya findlayi =

Species of flowering plant

Bertya findlayi, commonly known as mountain bertya, is a species of flowering plant in the family Euphorbiaceae and is endemic to south-eastern continental Australia. It is a tall shrub with many branches, narrowly oblong to narrowly egg-shaped leaves with the narrower end towards the base, light green flowers usually borne singly in leaf axils or on the ends of branches, and narrowly oval or narrowly elliptic capsules with a mottled brown seed.

== Description ==
Bertya findlayi is a tall monoecious shrub that typically grows up to 2 m (6 ft 7 in) high and has many branches. Its leaves are narrowly oblong, narrowly egg-shaped with the narrower end toward the base, or strap like, 20–46 mm (0.79–1.81 in) long and 4–9 mm (0.16–0.35 in) wide on a petiole 1.5–3.5 mm (0.059–0.138 in) long. The upper surface of the leaves is glabrous and green, the lower surface white and densely covered with star-shaped hairs. The flowers are usually borne singly on a peduncle 3–6 mm (0.12–0.24 in) long. There are four or five bracts, the outer bracts narrowly egg-shaped or triangular, 1.8–2.7 mm (0.071–0.106 in) long and 0.8–1.1 mm (0.031–0.043 in) wide. Male flowers are sessile with five light green, egg-shaped sepal lobes 3.5–4.6 mm (0.14–0.18 in) long and 2.5–3.3 mm (0.098–0.130 in) wide and have 35 to 41 stamens. Female flowers are sessile with five light green, narrowly egg-shaped to narrowly triangular sepal lobes, 4.2–4.6 mm (0.17–0.18 in) long and 1.9–2.2 mm (0.075–0.087 in) wide. Female flowers usually have no petals, the ovary is moderately covered with star-shaped hairs, and the style is 0.2–0.5 mm (0.0079–0.0197 in) long with three spreading red limbs 2.1–2.7 mm (0.083–0.106 in) long, each with three lobes 0.6–1.9 mm (0.024–0.075 in) long. Flowering has been recorded in April, July and September, and the fruit is a narrowly oval to elliptic capsule 7.5–9.3 mm (0.30–0.37 in) long and 3.9–5.2 mm (0.15–0.20 in) wide with a single oblong, brown seed with reddish-brown and light brown mottling, about 5.2–6.6 mm (0.20–0.26 in) long and 3.2–4.1 mm (0.13–0.16 in) wide with a yellowish-white caruncle.

== Taxonomy ==
Bertya findlayi was first formally described in 1874 by Ferdinand von Mueller in his Fragmenta Phytographiae Australiae from specimens collected near the "Hume River", (now the Murray River). The specific epithet (findlayi) honours James Findlay, who contributed specimens to the Melbourne Herbarium from the upper Murray and Mount Kosciuszko areas.

== Distribution and habitat ==
Mountain bertya is a rare species, found in deep valleys and gullies at higher altitudes in the far south east of the Southern Tablelands in New South Wales and from moist forests and watercourse in the Corryong area of Victoria.

== Conservation status ==
This species of Bertya is listed as "endangered" under the Victorian Government Flora and Fauna Guarantee Act 1988.
