= Bertya riparia =

Scientific classification
- Kingdom: Plantae
- Clade: Tracheophytes
- Clade: Angiosperms
- Clade: Eudicots
- Clade: Rosids
- Order: Malpighiales
- Family: Euphorbiaceae
- Genus: Bertya
- Species: B. riparia

Binomial name
- Bertya riparia Halford & R.J.F.Hend.

Species of flowering plant

Bertya riparia is a species of flowering plant in the family Euphorbiaceae and is endemic to the south-east of New South Wales. It is a monoecious shrub with many branches, linear or narrowly egg-shaped leaves with the narrower end towards the base, and sessile flowers borne singly or in pairs in leaf axils.

== Description ==
Bertya riparia is a monoecious shrub that has many branches and typically grows to a height of up to 1–2 m (3 ft 3 in – 6 ft 7 in). Its leaves are linear or narrowly egg-shaped with the narrower end towards the base, 21–29 mm (0.83–1.14 in) long and 2.4–4.4 mm (0.094–0.173 in) wide on a petiole 1.5–3.0 mm (0.059–0.118 in) long. The edges of the leaves are turned down, the upper surface and green, and the lower surface white and densely covered with star-shaped hairs. The flowers are borne singly or in pairs in leaf axils on a peduncle 1.5–2.5 mm (0.059–0.098 in) long. There are five to eight narrowly triangular outer bracts 2.9–3.2 mm (0.11–0.13 in) long and 1.7–2.2 mm (0.067–0.087 in) wide, the lower bracts longer and narrower. Male flowers are sessile with five elliptic sepal lobes 3–4 mm (0.12–0.16 in) long and 2.0–2.5 mm (0.079–0.098 in) wide and about 30 stamens. Female flowers are also sessile, the five sepal lobes more or less equal, 3.2–4.2 mm (0.13–0.17 in) long and there are no petals. The ovary is oval and densely covered with star-shaped hairs, the style 0.1–0.3 mm (0.0039–0.0118 in) long with three spreading red limbs 1.6–3.1 mm (0.063–0.122 in) long, each with three or four lobes 1.5–2.3 mm (0.059–0.091 in) long. Flowering has been observed in February, September and October.

== Taxonomy ==
Bertya riparia was first formally described in 2002 by David Halford and Rodney John Francis Henderson in the journal Austrobaileya from specimens collected in Kosciuszko National Park in 1993. The specific epithet (riparia) means 'inhabiting banks of watercourses', referring to the habitat of this species.

== Distribution and habitat ==
This species of Bertya is confined to the Southern Tablelands of south-east New South Wales where it grows in open forest or woodland from near Tumut to near Brindabella.
