= Bertya rosmarinifolia =

Scientific classification
- Kingdom: Plantae
- Clade: Tracheophytes
- Clade: Angiosperms
- Clade: Eudicots
- Clade: Rosids
- Order: Malpighiales
- Family: Euphorbiaceae
- Genus: Bertya
- Species: B. rosmarinifolia

Binomial name
- Bertya rosmarinifolia (A.Cunn.) Planch.

Species of flowering plant

Bertya rosmarinifolia is a flowering shrub in the family Euphorbiaceae and is endemic to Australia. It is a small shrub with red female flowers, yellow male flowers and hairy leaves and stems.

== Description ==
Bertya rosmarinifolia is a bushy shrub to 3 m (9.8 ft) high and covered with short, matted hairs, sometimes becoming smooth. The leaves are linear-shaped, 10–25 mm (0.39–0.98 in) long, usually 0.5–1.5 mm (0.020–0.059 in) wide and the lower surface with whitish short, matted hairs. The flowers are usually borne singly, small, peduncles 1–2 mm (0.039–0.079 in) long, usually six small bracts, thickened and almost equal in size with whitish hairs. Flowering occurs from December to January and the fruit is an ovoid capsule 4–6 mm (0.16–0.24 in) long and occasional woolly hairs at maturity.

== Taxonomy and naming ==
This species was firstly described as Croton rosmarinfolius by Allan Cunningham. In 1845 Jules Émile Planchon changed the name to Bertya rosmarinifolia and the description was published in The London Journal of Botany.The specific epithet (rosmarinifolia) means "leaves like rosemary".

== Distribution and habitat ==
This species is widespread near river corridors, forests or hilly areas in New South Wales and the Australian Capital Territory.
