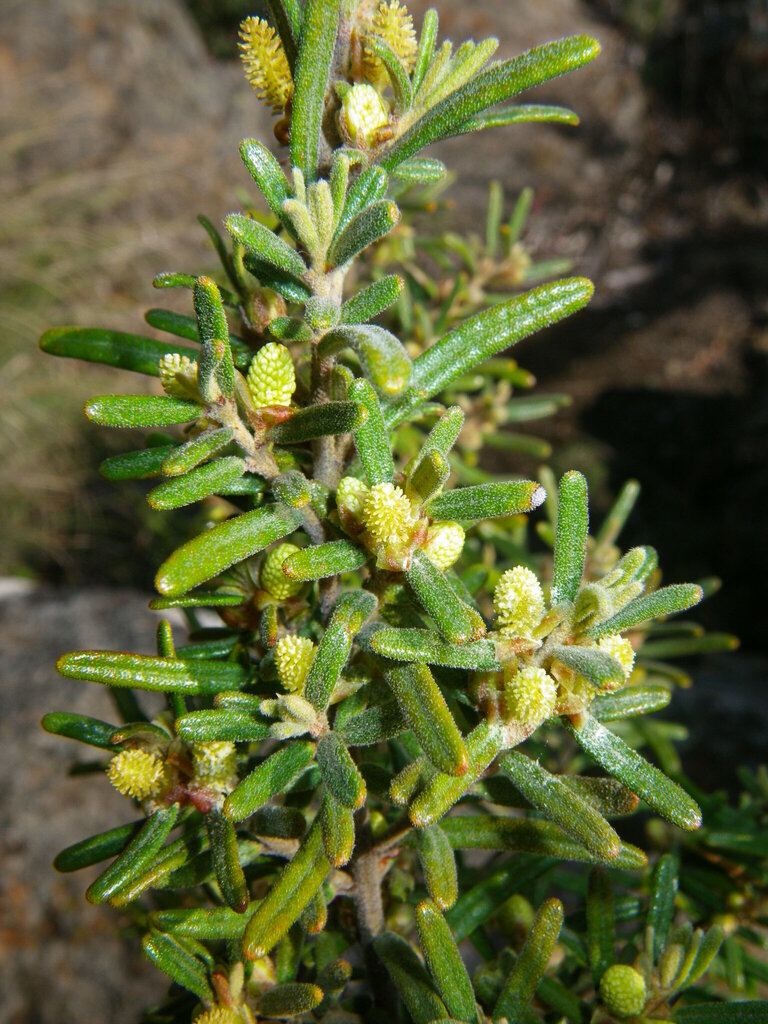
- In Mount Kaputar National Park

Conservation status
- Endangered (EPBC Act)

Scientific classification
- Kingdom: Plantae
- Clade: Tracheophytes
- Clade: Angiosperms
- Clade: Eudicots
- Clade: Rosids
- Order: Malpighiales
- Family: Euphorbiaceae
- Genus: Bertya
- Species: B. mollissima

Binomial name
- Bertya mollissima Blakely
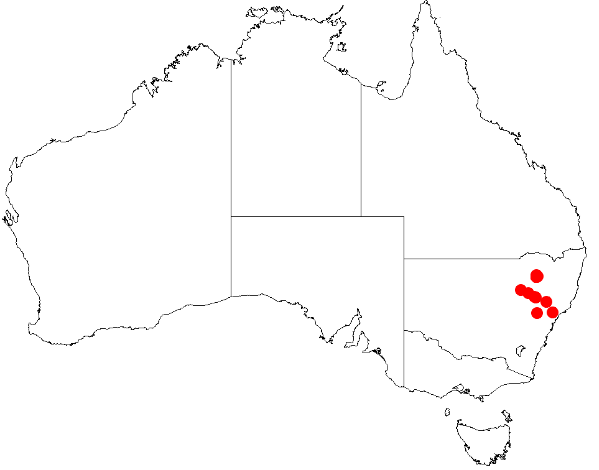
- Occurrence data from Australasian Virtual Herbarium

= Bertya mollissima =

Species of flowering plant

Bertya mollissima is a species of flowering plant in the family Euphorbiaceae and is endemic to New South Wales. It is a slender shrub with linear to oblong or strap-like leaves, separate male and female flowers on a short peduncle, and hairy, oval capsules.

== Description ==
Bertya mollissima is a shrub that typically grows to a height of 1–3 m (3 ft 3 in – 9 ft 10 in) and is covered with woolly hairs, the young growth and flowers with gold-coloured, woolly hairs. The leaves are linear to oblong or strap-like, 5–20 mm (0.20–0.79 in) long and 2–5 mm (0.079–0.197 in) wide with the edges rolled downwards, the upper surface dark green, the lower surface paler, the midrib prominent. Separate male and female flowers are borne on a peduncle 1.0–1.6 mm (0.039–0.063 in) long, although there are often more of one gender than the other. Male flowers have five petal-like, oblong to lance-shaped sepals about 4 mm (0.16 in) long and 3 mm (0.12 in) wide and 35 to 65 stamens 3.0–3.7 mm (0.12–0.15 in) long. Female flowers are sessile, with densely hairy, narrowly egg-shaped to egg-shaped sepals 2.0–2.7 mm (0.079–0.106 in) long, and a densely hairy ovary with a two- or three-branched style. Flowering mostly occurs from September to December, and the fruit is narrowly elliptic or narrowly oval, 5.5–7.6 mm (0.22–0.30 in) long with a single seed.

== Taxonomy ==
Bertya mollissima was first formally described in 1941 by William Faris Blakely in Contributions from the New South Wales National Herbarium from specimens collected in the Warrumbungles in 1899. The specific epithet (mollissima) means 'very soft'.

== Distribution and habitat ==
This species of Bertya grows on rocky slopes and mountain tops in open heath or open eucalypt woodland such as in Mount Kaputar, the Warrumbungle Ranges, the Liverpool Range and in the Scone and Singleton districts.

== Conservation status ==
Bertya mollissima is listed as "endangered" under the Australian Government Environment Protection and Biodiversity Conservation Act 1999 and the New South Wales Government Biodiversity Conservation Act 2016.
