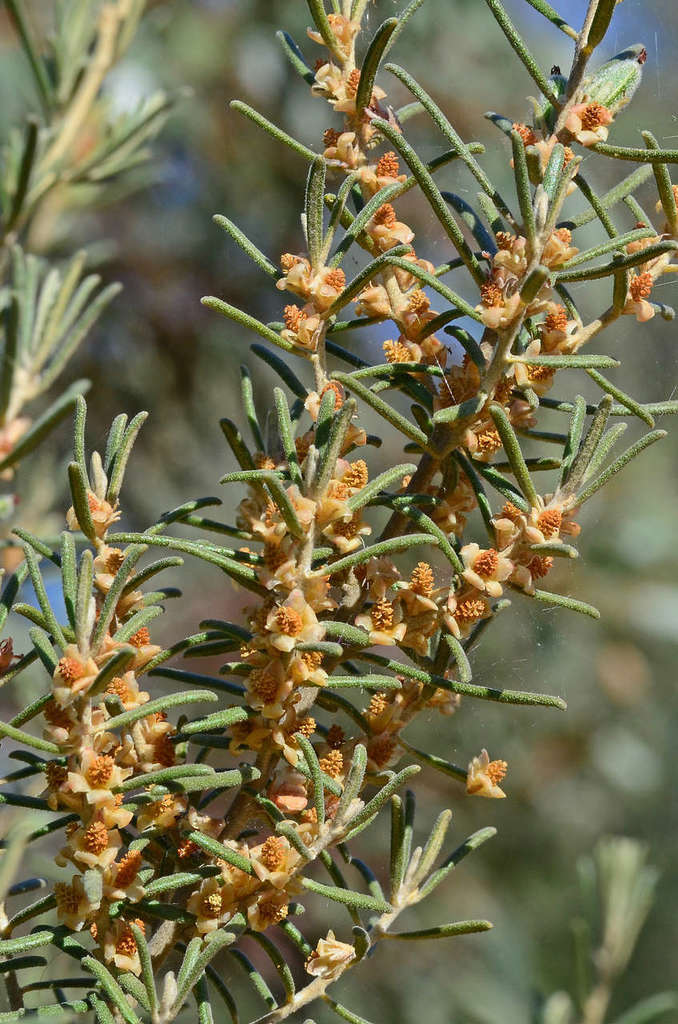
- Subsp. vestita in the Little Desert National Park

Scientific classification
- Kingdom: Plantae
- Clade: Tracheophytes
- Clade: Angiosperms
- Clade: Eudicots
- Clade: Rosids
- Order: Malpighiales
- Family: Euphorbiaceae
- Genus: Bertya
- Species: B. tasmanica

Binomial name
- Bertya tasmanica (Sond. & F.Muell.) Müll.Arg.
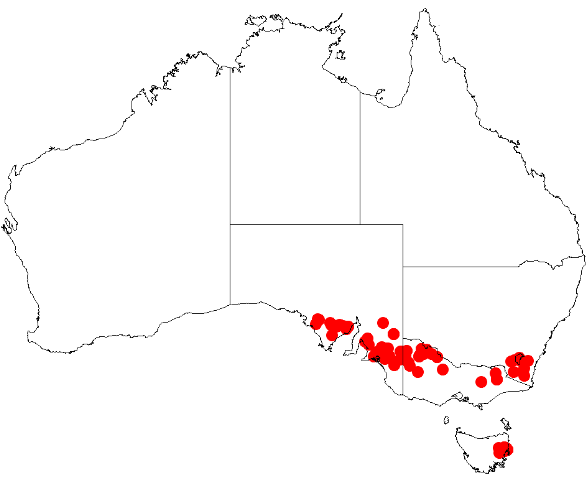
- Occurrence data from the Australasian Virtual Herbarium

Synonyms
- Ricinocarpos tasmanicus Sond. & F.Muell.; Ricinocarpus tasmanicus Sond. & F.Muell. orth. var.

= Bertya tasmanica =

Species of flowering plant

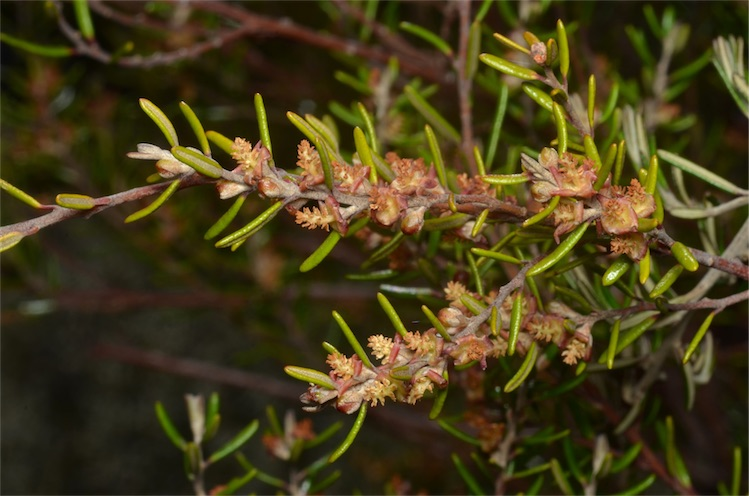
Subsp. tasmanica in the Tasmanian Bushland Garden

Bertya tasmanica is a species of flowering plant in the family Euphorbiaceae and is endemic to south-eastern Australia. It is a monoecious, or sometimes dioecious shrub with strap-like to linear leaves, and more or less sessile flowers borne singly in leaf axils, male flowers with 15 to 55 stamens and female flowers with hairy ovaries, the fruit a narrowly elliptic to narrowly oval capsule.

== Description ==
Bertya tasmanica is a monoecious or sometimes dioecious shrub that typically grows to a height of up to 2.5 m (8 ft 2 in) with densely hairy branchlets at first, later glabrous. The leaves are strap-like to linear, 8–32 mm (0.31–1.26 in) long and 1.2–1.6 mm (0.047–0.063 in) wide on a petiole 1.0–3.1 mm (0.039–0.122 in) long. The upper surface of the leaves is green to greyish-green, and the lower surface white and densely covered with star-shaped hairs.

The flowers are usually arranged singly, more or less sessile, the male flowers with five yellowish, egg-shaped, elliptic or oblong sepal lobes 2.4–5.1 mm (0.094–0.201 in) long and 2.0–3.2 mm (0.079–0.126 in) wide, and 15 to 55 stamens. Female flowers have five light green, narrowly egg-shaped to narrowly triangular, light green sepal lobes with a reddish tinge,1.8–4.3 mm (0.071–0.169 in) long, 0.7–1.9 mm (0.028–0.075 in) wide, and there are usually no petals. The ovary is elliptic, about 13–2.2 mm (0.512–0.087 in) long and 1.1–1.7 mm (0.043–0.067 in) wide and densely hairy, the style 0.1–0.6 mm (0.0039–0.0236 in) long usually with three spreading maroon or pale yellow limbs 1.6–2.9 mm (0.063–0.114 in) long, each with two to four lobes 1.0–2.3 mm (0.039–0.091 in) long. Flowering time depends on subspecies, and the seeds are light brown 3.9–5.2 mm (0.15–0.20 in) long and 1.8–3.1 mm (0.071–0.122 in) wide.

== Taxonomy ==
This species was first formally described in 1857 by Otto Wilhelm Sonder and Ferdinand von Mueller who gave it the name Ricinocarpos tasmanicus in the journal Linnaea. In 1865, Johannes Müller Argoviensis transferred the species to Bertya as B. tasmanica in a later edition of the same journal.

The names of two subspecies of B. tasmanica are accepted by the Australian Plant Census:

- Bertya tasmanica (Sond. & F.Muell.) Müll.Arg. subsp. tasmanica has leaves 8–21 mm (0.31–0.83 in) long, peduncles 0.8–1.4 mm (0.031–0.055 in) long, fruit 5.6–6.5 mm (0.22–0.26 in) long and flowers from September to November.
- Bertya tasmanica subsp. vestita Halford & R.J.F.Hend. has leaves 8–32 mm (0.31–1.26 in) long, peduncles 0.7–1.0 mm (0.028–0.039 in) long, fruit 6.4–8 mm (0.25–0.31 in) long and flowers mostly from September to December.

== Distribution and habitat ==
Bertya tasmanica subsp. vestita, is widespread from near Kimba in South Australia, eastwards to Swan Hill in Victoria near Coonabarabran and the Southern Tablelands of New South Wales where it mainly grows on sandplains or sand dunes in heath, shrubland, woodland or heath.

Subspecies tasmanica grows near watercourses in heath or woodland between Bicheno and Cranbrook on the east coast of Tasmania.

== Conservation status ==
Bertya tasmanica subsp. tasmanica is listed as "endangered" under the Australian Government Environment Protection and Biodiversity Conservation Act 1999 and the Tasmanian Government Threatened Species Protection Act 1995.
