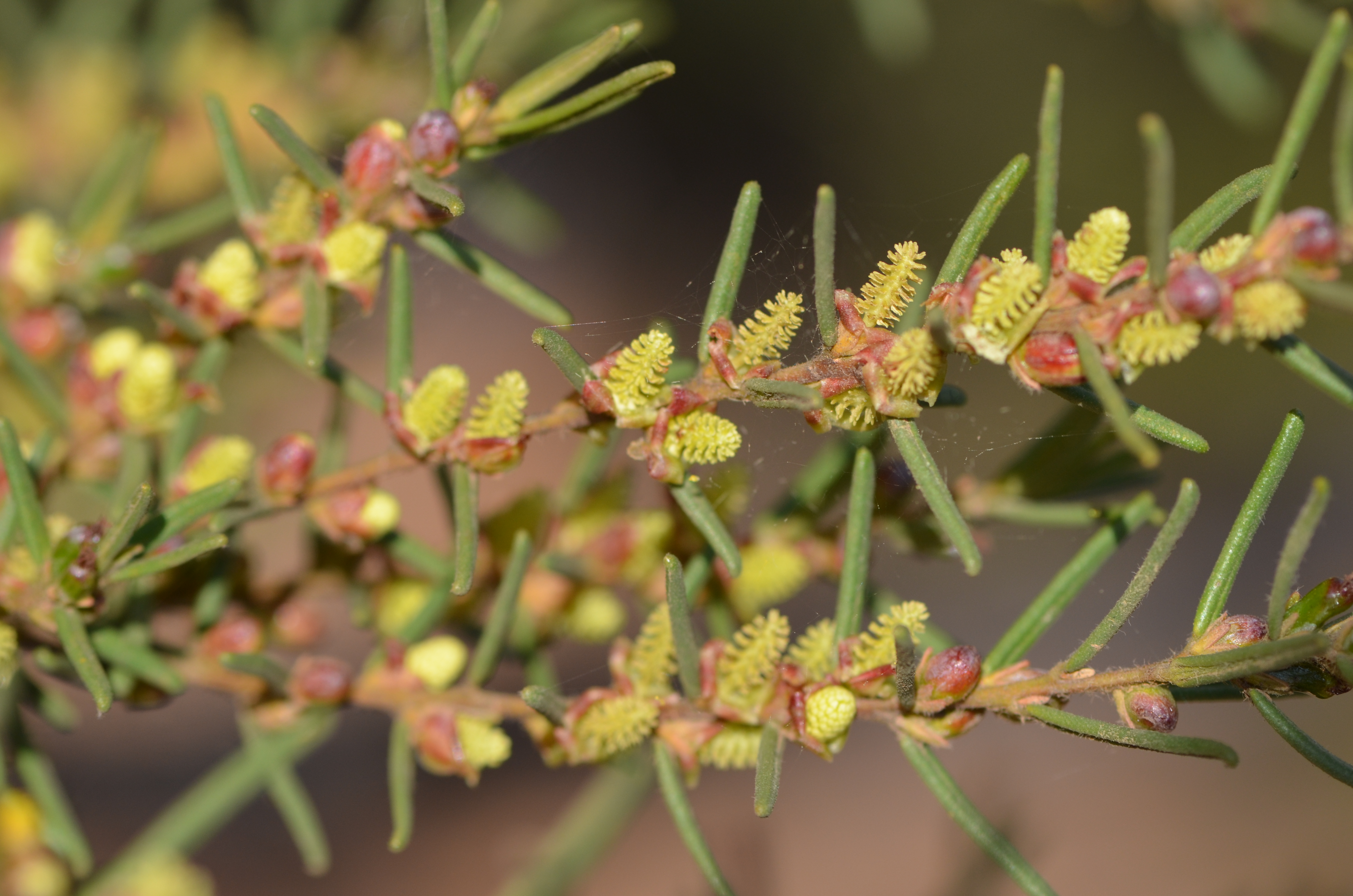
- Bertya gummifera

Scientific classification
- Kingdom: Plantae
- Clade: Tracheophytes
- Clade: Angiosperms
- Clade: Eudicots
- Clade: Rosids
- Order: Malpighiales
- Family: Euphorbiaceae
- Subfamily: Crotonoideae
- Tribe: Ricinocarpeae
- Subtribe: Bertyinae
- Genus: Bertya; Planch.

= Bertya =

Genus of flowering plants

Bertya is a genus of flowering plants in the family Euphorbiaceae endemic to Australia. Plants in the genus Bertya are shrubs, usually monoecious, with simple leaves, flowers arranged singly in leaf axils, male flowers with many stamens, female flowers usually smaller and narrower than male flowers, and the fruit a capsule containing a single seed.

== Description ==
Plants in the genus Bertya are usually monoecious, often sticky shrubs, either glabrous or covered with woolly, star-shaped hairs. The leaves are usually arranged alternately, simple, sessile or on a short petiole, flat or with the ends curved downwards, and lack stipules. The flowers are sessile or on a short pedicel, usually singly, or in umbel-like clusters on a peduncle in leaf axils. Male flowers usually have no petals, but many stamens with their bases fused, and no styles. Female flowers are small and narrower, have no petals, the ovary usually with three locules and three styles fused at the base. The fruit is a capsule, usually containing a single oval, elliptic or oblong seed with a creamy-white to yellowish caruncle.

== Taxonomy ==
The genus Bertya was first described in 1845 by Jules Émile Planchon in William Jackson Hooker's London Journal of Botany. The name of the genus (Bertya) honours the French botanist and horticulturist Count Léonce de Lambertye.

=== Species list ===
The following is a list of Berytia species accepted by the Australian Plant Census and Plants of the World Online as at January 2025:

- Bertya brownii S.Moore - (N.S.W)
- Bertya calycina Halford & R.J.F.Hend. - (Qld.)
- Bertya cunninghamii Planch. - wallaby bush, gooma bush, sticky Bertya (Qld., N.S.W., Victoria)
- Bertya dimerostigma F.Muell. - (W.A.)
- Bertya ernestiana Halford & R.J.F.Hend. - (Qld.)
- Bertya findlayi F.Muell. - (Vic., N.S.W.)
- Bertya glandulosa Grüning - (Qld.)
- Bertya grampiana Halford & R.J.F.Hend. - (Vic.)
- Bertya granitica Halford & R.J.F.Hend. - (Qld.)
- Bertya gummifera Planch. - (N.S.W.)
- Bertya ingramii T.A.James - (N.S.W.)
- Bertya lapicola Halford & R.J.F.Hend. - (Qld.)
- Bertya linearifolia Halford & R.J.F.Hend. - (N.S.W.)
- Bertya mollissima Blakely - (N.S.W.)
- Bertya oblonga Blakely - (N.S.W.)
- Bertya oleifolia Planch. - (N.S.W., Qld.)
- Bertya opponens (F.Muell. ex Benth.) Guymer - (N.S.W., Qld.)
- Bertya pedicellata F.Muell. - (Qld.)
- Bertya pinifolia Planch. - (Qld.)
- Bertya polystigma Grüning - (Qld.)
- Bertya pomaderroides F.Muell. - (N.S.W.)
- Bertya recurvata Halford & R.J.F.Hend. - (Qld.)
- Bertya riparia Halford & R.J.F.Hend. - (N.S.W.)
- Bertya rosmarinifolia Planch. (N.S.W., Qld.)
- Bertya rotundifolia F.Muell. - S.A
- Bertya sharpeana Guymer - (Qld.)
- Bertya tasmanica (Sond. & F.Muell.) Müll.Arg. - (N.S.W., Tas, S.A.)
- Bertya virgata (Ewart) Halford & R.J.F.Hend. - (W.A.)
