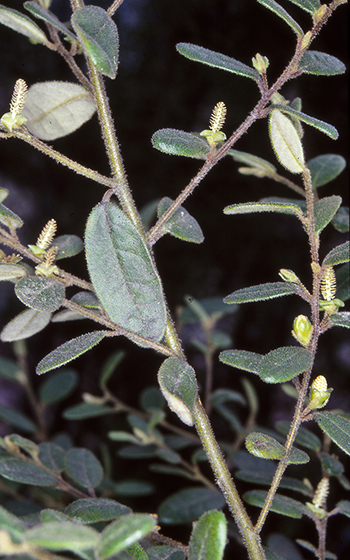
- Male flowers in the ANBG

Scientific classification
- Kingdom: Plantae
- Clade: Tracheophytes
- Clade: Angiosperms
- Clade: Eudicots
- Clade: Rosids
- Order: Malpighiales
- Family: Euphorbiaceae
- Genus: Bertya
- Species: B. brownii

Binomial name
- Bertya brownii S.Moore
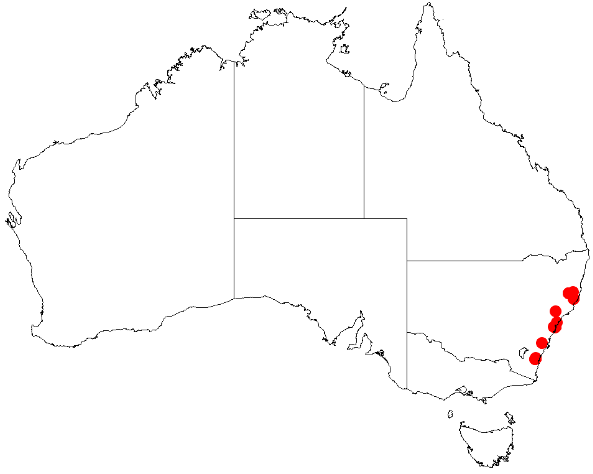
- Occurrence data from the Australasian Virtual Herbarium

Synonyms
- Bertya astrotricha Blakely

= Bertya brownii =

Species of flowering plant

Bertya brownii is a species of flowering plant in the family Euphorbiaceae and is endemic to New South Wales. It is a slender shrub with narrowly elliptic to elliptic or oblong leaves, flowers borne singly in leaf axils or on the ends of branches, and narrowly oval capsules with a dark brown seed.

== Description ==
Bertya brownii is a monoecious shrub that typically grows to a height of 1–3 m (3 ft 3 in – 9 ft 10 in) and is covered with rust-coloured, star-shaped hairs. Its leaves are narrowly elliptic to elliptic or egg-shaped to oblong, mostly 19–54 mm (0.75–2.13 in) long and 9–17 mm (0.35–0.67 in) wide on a petiole 2.2–4.5 mm (0.087–0.177 in) long. The flowers are borne singly in leaf axils or on the ends of branches on a peduncle 8–18 mm (0.31–0.71 in) long. There are four to six narrowly egg-shaped to linear bracts at the base of the peduncle. Male flowers are sessile or on a pedicel up to 1 mm (0.039 in) long with petal-like segments 4–5 mm (0.16–0.20 in) long and five egg-shaped sepal lobes 3.1–5.6 mm (0.12–0.22 in) long and 2.0–3.3 mm (0.079–0.130 in) wide. Male flowers have 56 to 94 stamens fused at the base. Female flowers are borne on a pedicel 0.5–2.5 mm (0.020–0.098 in) long, the five sepal lobes light green and narrowly triangular, 2.2–3.0 mm (0.087–0.118 in) long and 0.5–0.8 mm (0.020–0.031 in) wide. There are no petals, the ovary is densely hairy at first and the style is 0.1–0.3 mm (0.0039–0.0118 in) long with three spreading red limbs 1.9–5.2 mm (0.075–0.205 in) long with lobes 1.5–4 mm (0.059–0.157 in) long. Flowering has been recorded in most months, and the fruit is a narrowly oval capsule 9.0–9.5 mm (0.35–0.37 in) long and 3.5–4.3 mm (0.14–0.17 in) wide with a single oblong, dark brown seed 5.5–6.5 mm (0.22–0.26 in) long and 2.7–3.3 mm (0.11–0.13 in) wide with a creamy-white caruncle.

== Taxonomy ==
Bertya brownii was first formally described in 1905 by Spencer Le Marchant Moore in the Journal of Botany, British and Foreign from specimens collected by Robert Brown.

== Distribution and habitat ==
This species of Bertya is found in deep, moist sandstone gullies in rainforest and eucalypt forest in coastal and near-coastal areas of New South Wales between Wauchope and Batemans Bay.
