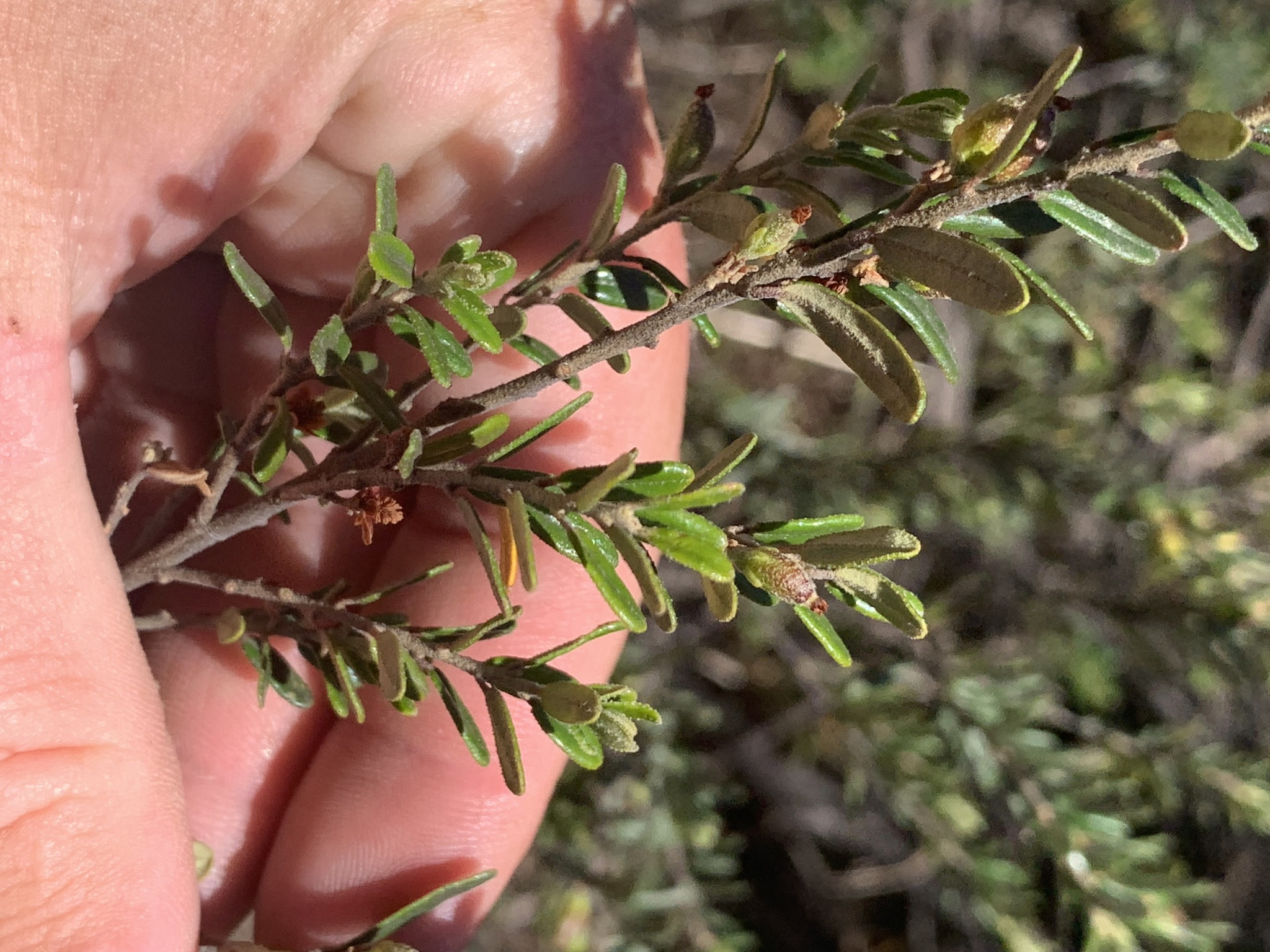

Scientific classification
- Kingdom: Plantae
- Clade: Tracheophytes
- Clade: Angiosperms
- Clade: Eudicots
- Clade: Rosids
- Order: Malpighiales
- Family: Euphorbiaceae
- Genus: Bertya
- Species: B. oblonga

Binomial name
- Bertya oblonga Blakely
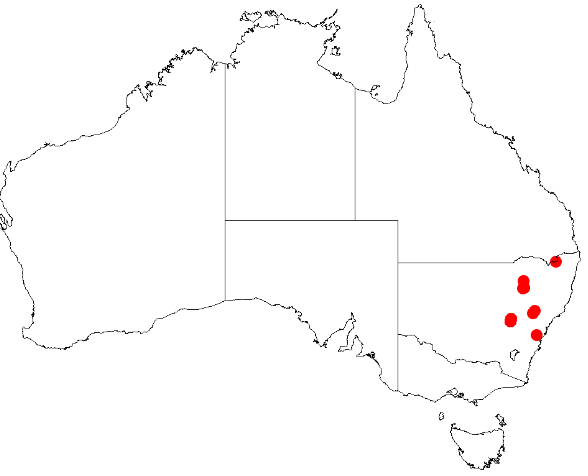
- Occurrence data from Australasian Virtual Herbarium

= Bertya oblonga =

Species of flowering plant

Bertya oblonga is a species of flowering plant in the family Euphorbiaceae and is endemic to New South Wales. It is a shrub with narrowly oblong to strap-like or sometimes linear leaves, separate male and female flowers, and oval to elliptic capsules with star-shaped hairs.

== Description ==
Bertya oblonga is a shrub that typically grows to a height of up to 1.8 m (5 ft 11 in), its young branchlets densely covered with straw-coloured or greyish, star-shaped hairs. The leaves are narrowly oblong to strap-like or sometimes linear, 8–23 mm (0.31–0.91 in) long and 1.3–3 mm (0.051–0.118 in) wide with the edges flat or rolled downwards, the upper surface glabrous. Separate male and female flowers are borne on a peduncle 1.5–2.5 mm (0.059–0.098 in) long, the male flowers 30 to 45 stamens. Female flowers are on pedicels 0.4–1.2 mm (0.016–0.047 in) long, with narrowly triangular sepals 1.5–2.0 mm (0.059–0.079 in) long, hairy on the lower surface, and a densely hairy ovary. Flowering occurs from July to October, and the fruit is oval to elliptic, 7.5–9 mm (0.30–0.35 in) long with a single seed.

== Taxonomy ==
Bertya oblonga was first formally described in 1929 by William Faris Blakely in Proceedings of the Linnean Society of New South Wales from specimens he collected about 1,760 ft (540 m), 21 mi (34 km) south-west of Molong in 1907.

== Distribution and habitat ==
This species of Bertya grows on rocky ridge tops or steep hillsides in shrubland, woodland or forest in scattered places between Boggabri, Molong and Denman.
