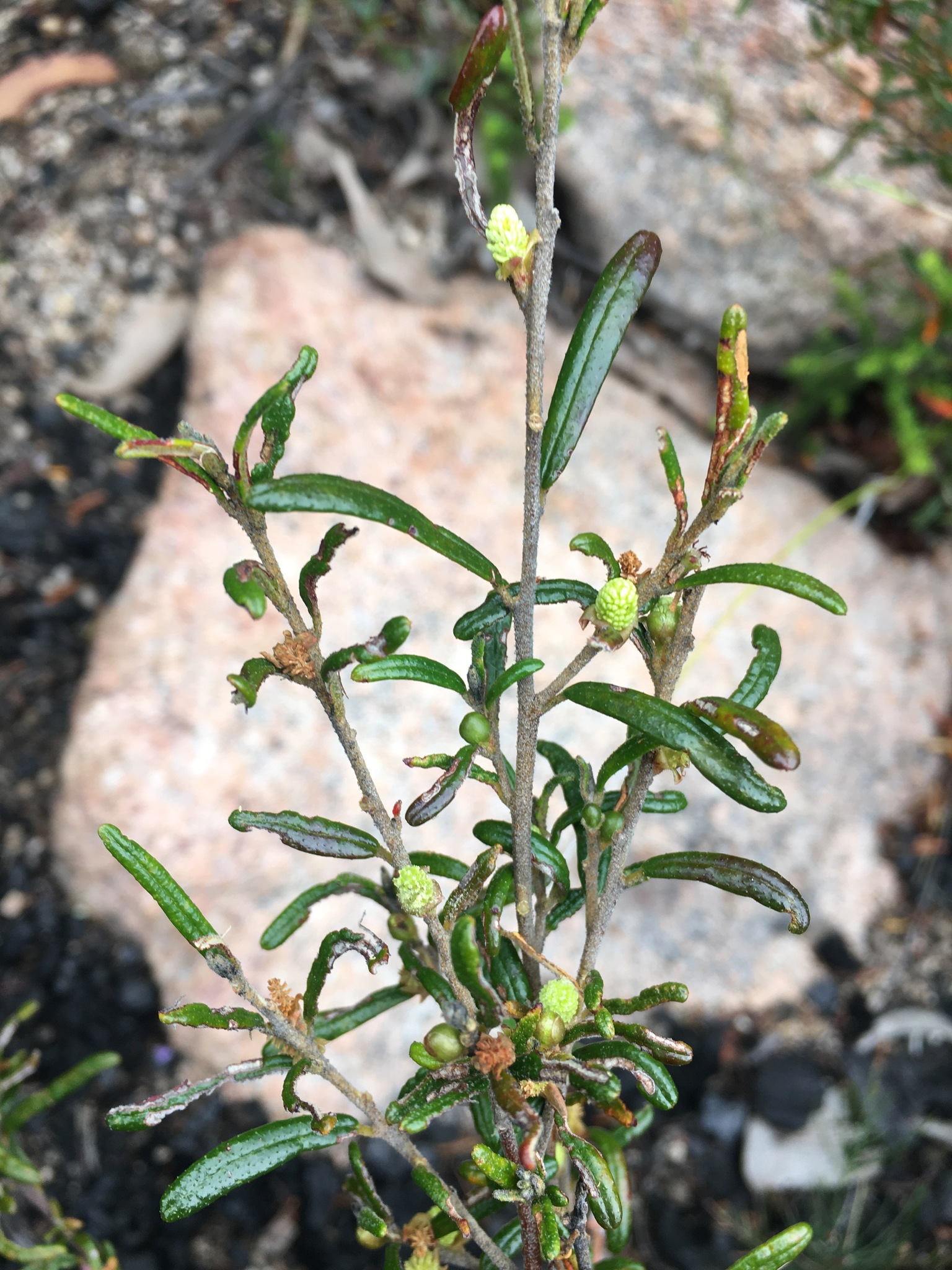
- In Girraween National Park

Conservation status
- Vulnerable (NCA)

Scientific classification
- Kingdom: Plantae
- Clade: Tracheophytes
- Clade: Angiosperms
- Clade: Eudicots
- Clade: Rosids
- Order: Malpighiales
- Family: Euphorbiaceae
- Genus: Bertya
- Species: B. glandulosa

Binomial name
- Bertya glandulosa Grüning
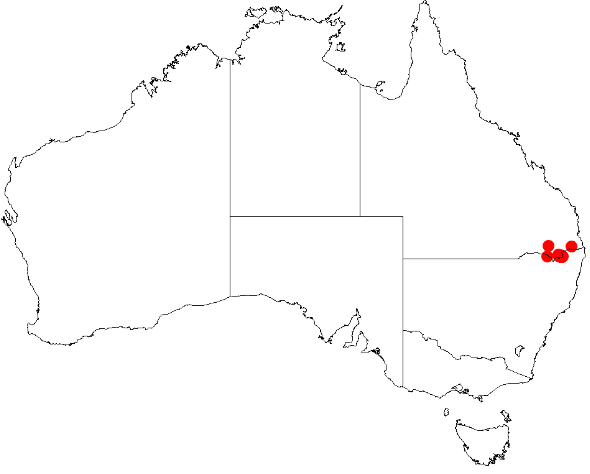
- Occurrence data from the Australasian Virtual Herbarium

= Bertya glandulosa =

Species of flowering plant

Bertya glandulosa is a species of flowering plant in the family Euphorbiaceae and is endemic to eastern Australia. It is a shrub with many branches, narrowly oblong to strap-like leaves, flowers borne singly in leaf axils, and narrowly elliptic capsules with a dark red seed.

== Description ==
Bertya glandulosa is a monoecious or dioecious shrub that typically grows to a height of up to 2 m (6 ft 7 in) and has many branches. Its leaves are narrowly oblong to strap-like, rarely narrowly egg-shaped, with the narrower end towards the base, 10–27 mm (0.39–1.06 in) long and 1.5–3.2 mm (0.059–0.126 in) wide on a petiole 1.6–3.1 mm (0.063–0.122 in) long. The upper surface of the leaves is green with a few star-shaped hairs, and the lower surface is white and densely covered with star-shaped hairs. The flowers are borne singly in leaf axils on a peduncle 1.5 mm (0.059 in) long. There are four to six linear or narrowly egg-shaped to egg-shaped bracts 1.5–2.5 mm (0.059–0.098 in) long and 0.5–0.9 mm (0.020–0.035 in) wide that are persistent until the fruit matures. Male flowers are on a pedicel 0.5–0.8 mm (0.020–0.031 in) long with five yellowish-green, oblong sepal lobes 3.1–3.7 mm (0.12–0.15 in) long and 1.5–2.1 mm (0.059–0.083 in) wide and have 25 to 30 stamens. Female flowers are sessile with five yellowish-green sepal lobes that are egg-shaped to oblong, 1.5–2.2 mm (0.059–0.087 in) long and 0.7–1.2 mm (0.028–0.047 in) wide. Female flowers usually have no petals, the ovary glabrous and smooth, and the style is 0.1–0.2 mm (0.0039–0.0079 in) long with three spreading red limbs 1.3–3.4 mm (0.051–0.134 in) long, each with three to five lobes 1.1–1.2 mm (0.043–0.047 in) long. Flowering has been recorded in January, June and from August to October, and the fruit is a narrowly elliptic capsule 7–8 mm (0.28–0.31 in) long and 3.7–4.2 mm (0.15–0.17 in) wide with a single oblong to elliptic, dark red seed 2.4–2.7 mm (0.094–0.106 in) long and 1.1–1.4 mm (0.043–0.055 in) wide with a creamy-white caruncle.

== Taxonomy ==
Bertya glandulosa was first formally described in 1913 by Georg Grüning in Engler's Das Pflanzenreich from specimens collected by John Luke Boorman at Wallangarra. The specific epithet (glandulosa) means 'gland-bearing'.

== Distribution and habitat ==
This species of Bertya grows in open eucalypt woodland or dense open shrubland in the Stanthorpe-Wallangarra area of south-east Queensland and northern New South Wales.

== Conservation status ==
Bertya glandulosa is listed as "vulnerable" under the Queensland Government Nature Conservation Act 1992.
