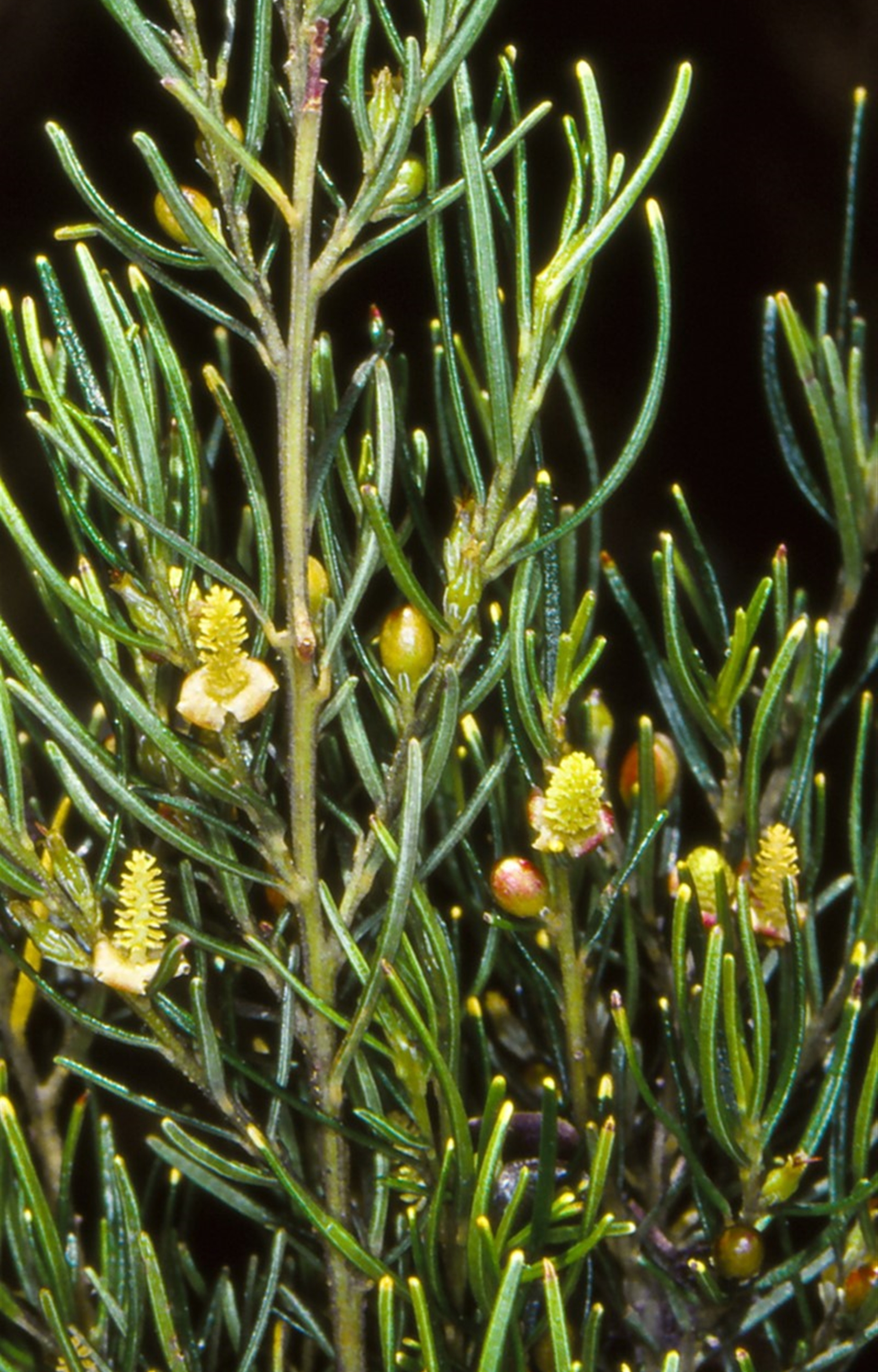
- Male flowers in Bungonia National Park

Conservation status
- Vulnerable (NCA)

Scientific classification
- Kingdom: Plantae
- Clade: Tracheophytes
- Clade: Angiosperms
- Clade: Eudicots
- Clade: Rosids
- Order: Malpighiales
- Family: Euphorbiaceae
- Genus: Bertya
- Species: B. cunninghamii

Binomial name
- Bertya cunninghamii Planch.
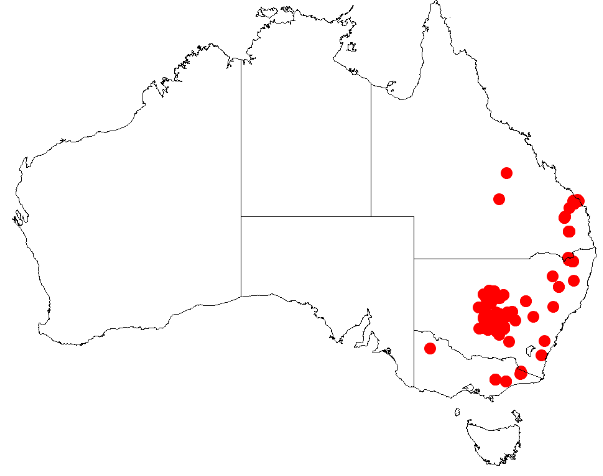
- Occurrence data from the Australasian Virtual Herbarium

= Bertya cunninghamii =

Species of flowering plant

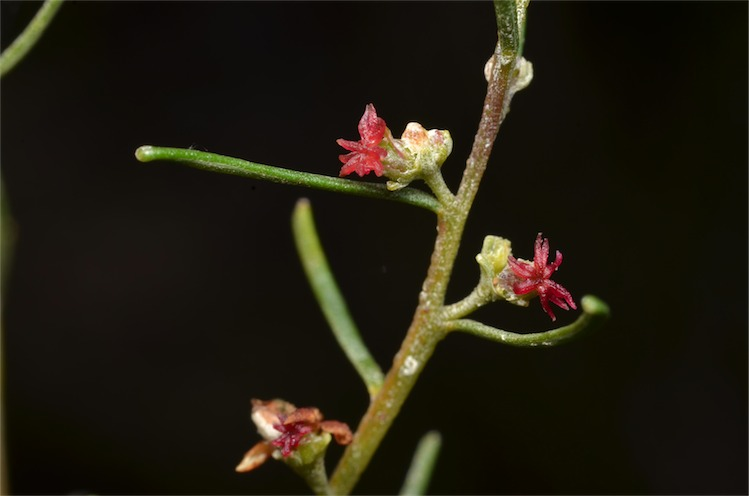
Female flowers

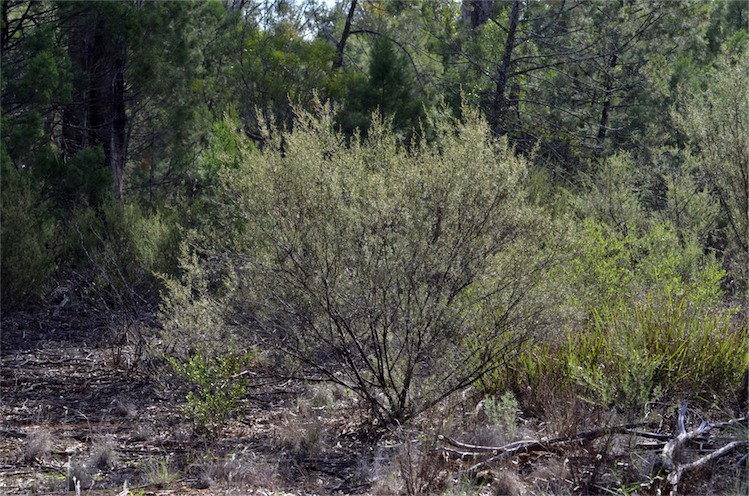
Habit near West Wyalong

Bertya cunninghamii, commonly known as wallaby bush, gooma bush or sticky Bertya, is a species of flowering plant in the family Euphorbiaceae and is endemic to eastern Australia. It is a monoecious shrub with many branches, linear leaves, flowers borne singly or in pairs in leaf axils, and oval or elliptic capsules with a mottled seed.

== Description ==
Bertya cunninghamii is a monoecious shrub that typically grows to a height of up to 1.5–3 m (4 ft 11 in – 9 ft 10 in) and has many sticky branches. Its leaves are linear, 8–27 mm (0.31–1.06 in) long and 0.6–0.9 mm (0.024–0.035 in) wide on a petiole up to 1 mm (0.039 in) long. The upper surface of the leaves is glabrous and green, the lower surface white and densely covered with star-shaped hairs. The flowers are borne singly or in pairs in leaf axils on a with narrowly egg-shaped to oblong or egg-shaped bracts 0.7–1.7 mm (0.028–0.067 in) long and 0.3–0.7 mm (0.012–0.028 in). Male flowers are sessile or on a short peduncle, each flower on a pedicel up to 0.4 mm (0.016 in) long with five yellowish-green egg-shaped, elliptic or oblong elliptic sepal lobes 2.6–3.7 mm (0.10–0.15 in) long and 1.5–2.5 mm (0.059–0.098 in) wide and 15 to 56 stamens. Female flowers are sessile or on a pedicel up to 2.5 mm (0.098 in) long, the five sepal lobes light green, 1.3–2.0 mm (0.051–0.079 in) long and 0.9–1.1 mm (0.035–0.043 in) wide. Female flowers usually have no petals, the ovary is glabrous and the style is 0.1–0.3 mm (0.0039–0.0118 in) long with usually three spreading red to maroon limbs 1.2–1.8 mm (0.047–0.071 in) long with two or three lobes 0.7–1.3 mm (0.028–0.051 in) long. Flowering time depends on subspecies, and the fruit is an oval or elliptic capsule 4.8–7.2 mm (0.19–0.28 in) long and 3.2–4.2 mm (0.13–0.17 in) wide, usually with a single oblong or elliptic, light brown seed mottled with dark brown and reddish-brown, 3.9–5.7 mm (0.15–0.22 in) long and 2.2–2.7 mm (0.087–0.106 in) wide with a yellowish-white caruncle.

== Taxonomy ==
Bertya cunninghamii was first formally described in 1845 by Jules Émile Planchon in Hooker's London Journal of Botany. The specific epithet (cunninghamii) honours Allan Cunningham who collected the type specimens.

In 2002, David Halford and Rodney John Francis Henderson described three subspecies of B. cunninghamii in the journal Austrobaileya, and the names are accepted by the Australian Plant Census:

- Bertya cunninghamii Planch. subsp. cunninghamii is a shrub up to 3 m (9.8 ft) high with glabrous branchlets, petioles 0.3–0.6 mm (0.012–0.024 in) long, sepal lobes egg-shaped with fringed edges, and flowers throughout the year with a peak between June and September.
- Bertya cunninghamii subsp. pubiramula Halford & R.J.F.Hend. is a shrub up to 2 m (6 ft 7 in) high, the branchlets with a few soft, star-shaped hairs, and flowers in most months.
- Bertya cunninghamii subsp. rupicola Halford & R.J.F.Hend. is a shrub up to 2 m (6 ft 7 in) high with glabrous branchlets, petioles 0.5–1 mm (0.020–0.039 in) long, sepal lobes narrowly oblong to egg-shaped without fringes, and flowers in August, September and January.

== Distribution and habitat ==
- Subspecies cunninghamia is confined to an area between Cobar, Nyngan, West Wyalong and Forbes in central New South Wales where it grows in woodland or mallee with eucalypts or Callitris species in sandy or loamy soils.
- Subspecies pubiramula has a disjunct distribution with populations near Batemans Bay and Dubbo in New South Wales and from Licola to Cann River in Victoria, where it grows in open shrubland on rocky outcrops.
- Subspecies rupicola occurs in open shrubland in isolated populations from near Bundaberg, Preston and Cooyar in south-east Queensland and near Glen Innes in New South Wales.

== Conservation status ==
Bertya cunninghamii subsp. pubiramula is listed as "endangered" under the Victorian Government Flora and Fauna Guarantee Act 1988.
