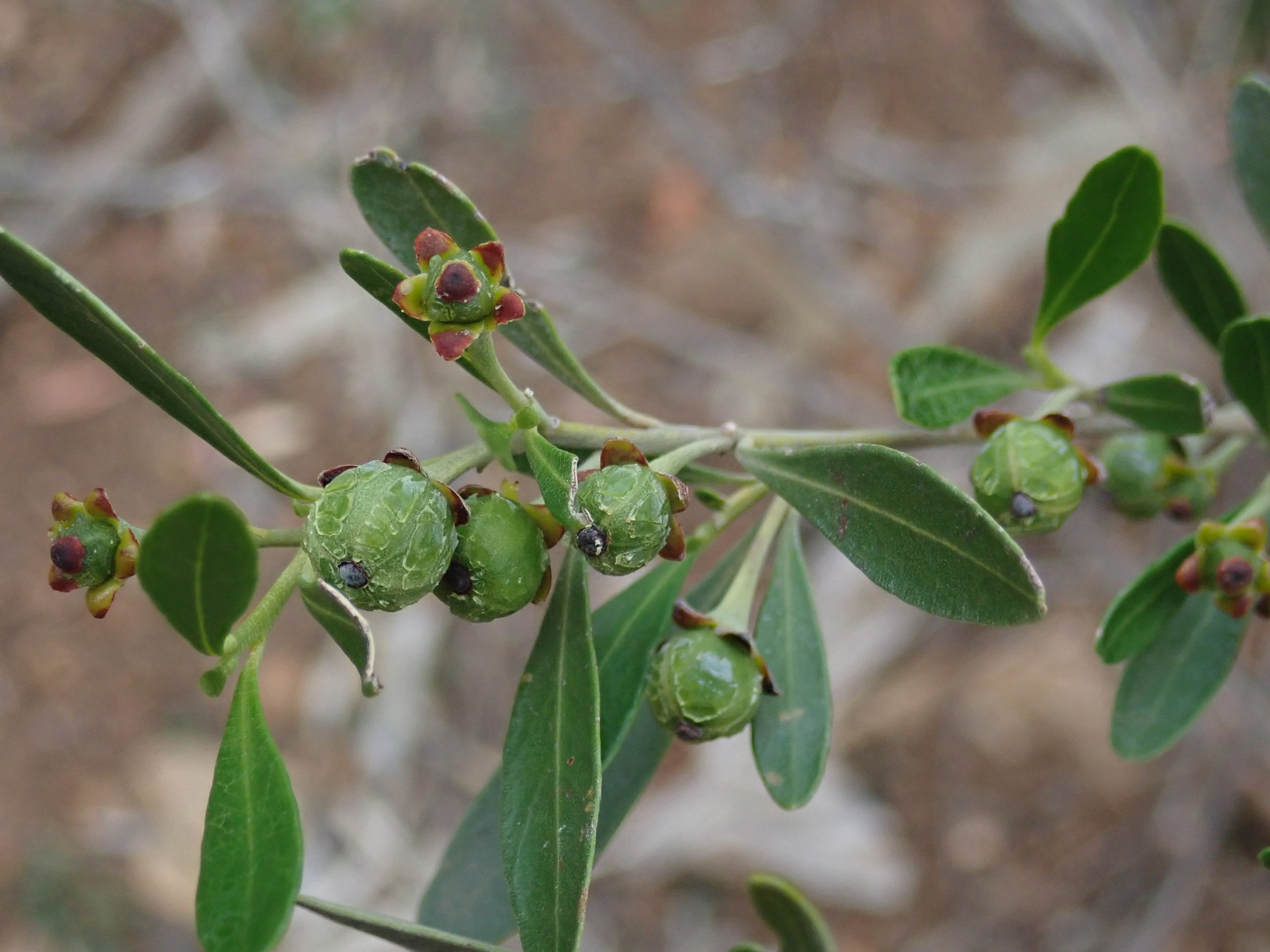
- Fruit near Narrabri

Conservation status
- Vulnerable (EPBC Act)

Scientific classification
- Kingdom: Plantae
- Clade: Tracheophytes
- Clade: Angiosperms
- Clade: Eudicots
- Clade: Rosids
- Order: Malpighiales
- Family: Euphorbiaceae
- Genus: Bertya
- Species: B. opponens

Binomial name
- Bertya opponens (F.Muell. ex Benth.) Guymer
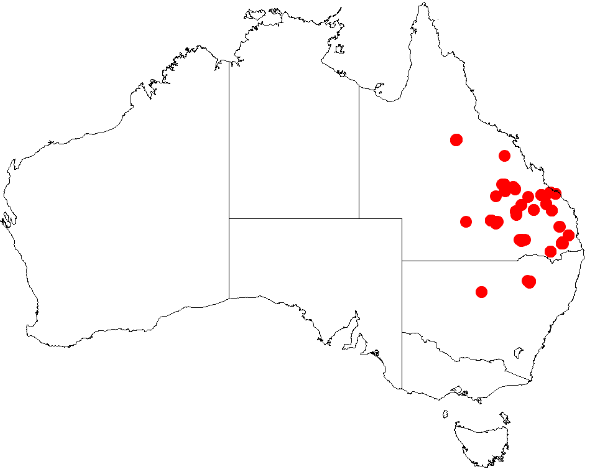
- Occurrence data from the Australasian Virtual Herbarium

Synonyms
- Bertya oppositifolia F.Muell. & O'Shanesy; Croton opponens F.Muell. ex Benth.

= Bertya opponens =

Species of flowering plant

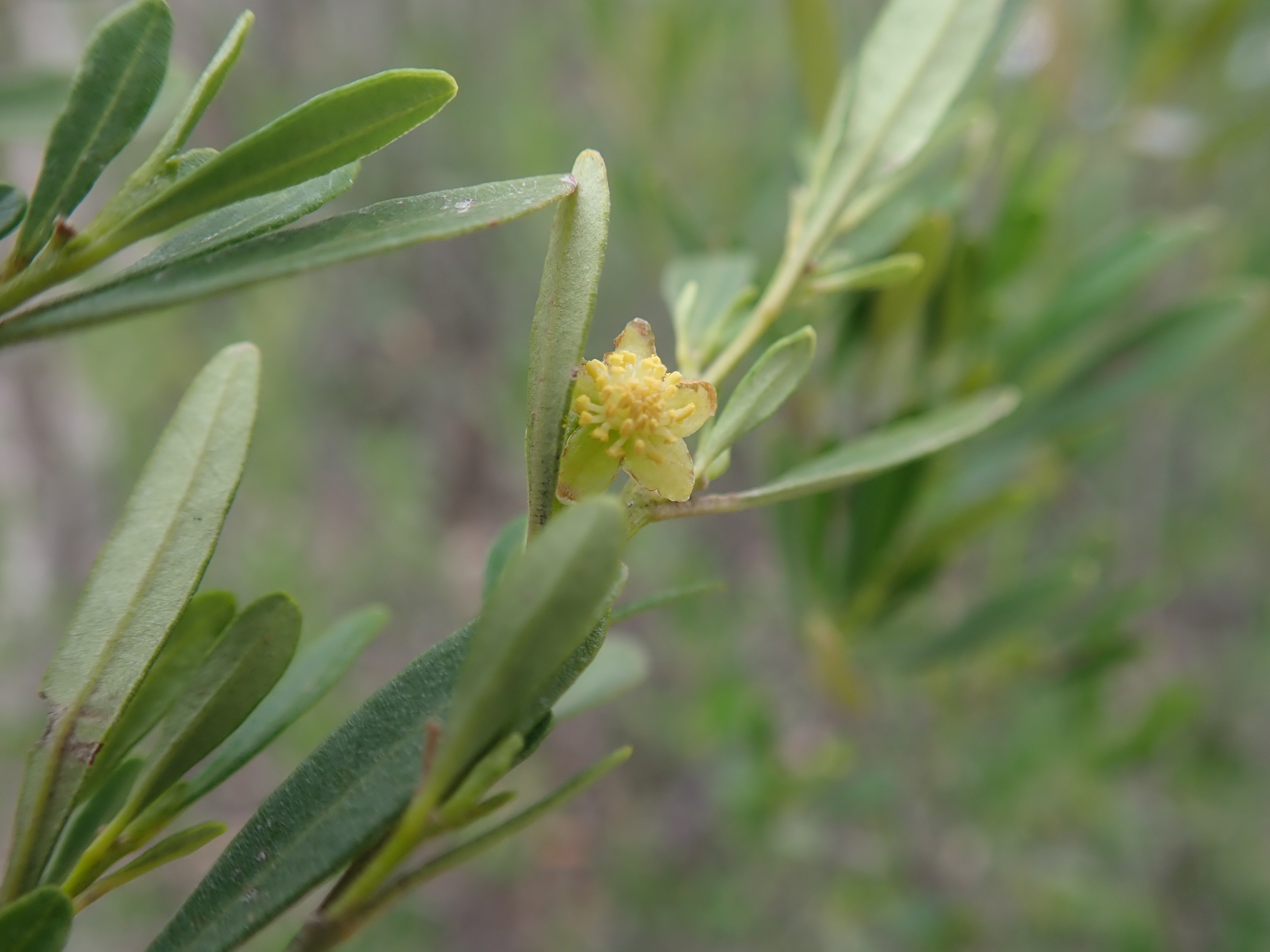
Male flower and leaves

Bertya opponens is a species of flowering plant in the family Euphorbiaceae and is endemic to eastern Australia. It is a slender shrub or small tree with oblong to lance-shaped or narrowly elliptic leaves arranged in opposite pairs, separate male and female flowers, and oval to spherical capsules densely covered with shaggy hairs.

== Description ==
Bertya opponens is a slender shrub or small tree that typically grows to a height of up to 4 m (13 ft), and has a dense covering of whitish to brown hairs. Its leaves are mostly arranged in opposite pairs, oblong to lance-shaped with the narrower end towards the base, or narrowly elliptic, 10–50 mm (0.39–1.97 in) long and 5–25 mm (0.20–0.98 in) wide on a petiole 3–5 mm (0.12–0.20 in) long. The upper surface of the leaves is hairy, the lower surfaces is densely covered with woolly white hairs, and the edges are curved down or rolled under. The flowers are more or less sessile with up to three male and female flowers on a peduncle up to 2 mm (0.079 in) long. Male flowers are 6–13 mm (0.24–0.51 in) long with 75 to 115 stamens and female flowers have egg-shaped to broadly egg-shaped sepals 5.0–5.7 mm (0.20–0.22 in) long with an ovary densely covered with star-shaped hairs and a deeply lobed style. The fruit is a densely hairy, oval to spherical capsule 8–9 mm (0.31–0.35 in) long.

== Taxonomy ==
This species was first described in 1873 by George Bentham who gave it the name Croton opponens in Flora Australiensis from an unpublished description by Ferdinand von Mueller. In 1985, Guymer transferred the species to Bertya as B. opponens in the journal Austrobaileya.

== Distribution and habitat ==
This species of Bertya grows in mixed shrubland, woodland and mallee north of Charters Towers in Queensland and near Cobar and Narrabri in New South Wales.

== Conservation status ==
Bertya opponens is listed as "vulnerable" under the Australian Government Environment Protection and Biodiversity Conservation Act 1999 and the New South Wales Government Biodiversity Conservation Act 2016 (NSW).
