= Bertya pinifolia =

Conservation status
- Vulnerable (EPBC Act)

Scientific classification
- Kingdom: Plantae
- Clade: Tracheophytes
- Clade: Angiosperms
- Clade: Eudicots
- Clade: Rosids
- Order: Malpighiales
- Family: Euphorbiaceae
- Genus: Bertya
- Species: B. pinifolia

Binomial name
- Bertya pinifolia Planch.
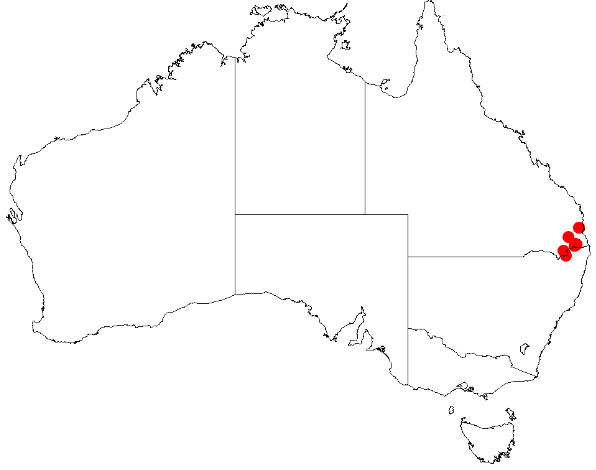
- Occurrence data from the Australasian Virtual Herbarium

Species of flowering plant

Bertya pinifolia is a species of flowering plant in the family Euphorbiaceae and is endemic to Queensland. It is a monoecious, sticky shrub with many branches, linear leaves, separate male and female flowers arranged singly, male flowers with 30 to 45 stamens, female flowers with a glabrous ovary, and narrowly elliptic capsules usually with a single seed.

== Description ==
Bertya pinifolia is a monoecious shrub that typically grows to a height of up to 2 m (6 ft 7 in) and has many glabrous branches, with most parts of the plant sticky. The leaves are linear, 25–60 mm (0.98–2.36 in) long and 0.8–1.5 mm (0.031–0.059 in) wide on a petiole 0.7–1.6 mm (0.028–0.063 in) long. The lower surface of the leaves is densely covered with white, star shaped hairs, the edges curved downwards or rolled under. The flowers are arranged singly in leaf axils on a pedicel up to 1.5 mm (0.059 in) long. Male flowers have five yellowish green egg-shaped to elliptic sepals 3–4.8 mm (0.12–0.19 in) long and 30 to 45 stamens. Female flowers have five yellowish-green, elliptic to oblong sepals 2.9–3.6 mm (0.11–0.14 in) long and a glabrous ovary 1.1–1.3 mm (0.043–0.051 in) long and 1.0–1.2 mm (0.039–0.047 in) wide, the style with three deeply lobed red limbs. Flowering has been observed from July to September, and the fruit is narrowly elliptic, 7.0–7.5 mm (0.28–0.30 in) long and 3.2–3.5 mm (0.13–0.14 in) wide, usually with a single seed.

== Taxonomy ==
Bertya pinifolia was first formally described in 1845 by Jules Émile Planchon in Hooker's London Journal of Botany from specimens collected near Brisbane by Charles Fraser. The specific epithet (pinifolia) means 'pine-leaved'.

== Distribution and habitat ==
This species of Bertya grows in rocky ridges in open heath or shrubland near Boonah in south-eastern Queensland.

== Conservation status ==
Bertya pinifolia is listed as "vulnerable" under the Australian Government Environment Protection and Biodiversity Conservation Act 1999 and the Queensland Government Nature Conservation Act 1992.
