= Bertya linearifolia =

Scientific classification
- Kingdom: Plantae
- Clade: Tracheophytes
- Clade: Angiosperms
- Clade: Eudicots
- Clade: Rosids
- Order: Malpighiales
- Family: Euphorbiaceae
- Genus: Bertya
- Species: B. linearifolia

Binomial name
- Bertya linearifolia Halford & R.J.F.Hend.

Species of flowering plant

Bertya linearifolia is a species of flowering plant in the family Euphorbiaceae and is endemic to a restricted part of New South Wales. It is a monoecious shrub with many branches, linear leaves, flowers borne singly in leaf axils or on the ends of branches, and narrowly oval or pear-shaped capsules.

== Description ==
Bertya linearifolia is a monoecious shrub that has many branches with a thin, sticky film young shoots and branchlets. Its leaves are linear, 12–18 mm (0.47–0.71 in) long and 1.0–1.3 mm (0.039–0.051 in) wide on a petiole 1.0–1.5 mm (0.039–0.059 in) long. The upper surface of the leaves is glabrous, green and smooth, and the lower surface is white and densely covered with star-shaped hairs. The flowers are usually borne singly in leaf axils or sometimes on the ends of branches, on a peduncle 2–3 mm (0.079–0.118 in) long. There are two to five strap-like bracts 1.0–1.8 mm (0.039–0.071 in) long and 0.3–0.4 mm (0.012–0.016 in) wide. Male flowers are sessile or on a pedicel up to 1 mm (0.039 in) long with five elliptic or oblong sepal lobes 3.5–4.0 mm (0.14–0.16 in) long and 2.0–2.3 mm (0.079–0.091 in) wide and 25 to 35 stamens. Female flowers are on pedicels 2.5–5.0 mm (0.098–0.197 in) long, the five sepal lobes linear, about 2.5 mm (0.098 in) long and 1 mm (0.039 in) wide. Female flowers have no petals, the ovary is narrowly elliptic and glabrous, the style about 1 mm (0.039 in) long with three ascending limbs 3.0–3.5 mm (0.12–0.14 in) long, each with two or three lobes 1.5–3.5 mm (0.059–0.138 in) long. Flowering has been observed in July, and the fruit is a narrowly oval or pear-shaped capsule, 8.5–10.0 mm (0.33–0.39 in) long and 3.2–5.2 mm (0.13–0.20 in) wide with a single seed.

== Taxonomy ==
Bertya linearifolia was first formally described in 2002 by David Halford and Rodney John Francis Henderson in the journal Austrobaileya from specimens collected in the Baerami Valley 30 km (19 mi) from Sandy Hollow in 1988. The specific epithet (linearifolia) means 'linear-leaved'.

== Distribution and habitat ==
This species of Bertya confined to the Denman-Sandy Hollow area where it grows on a ridge with eucalypts.
