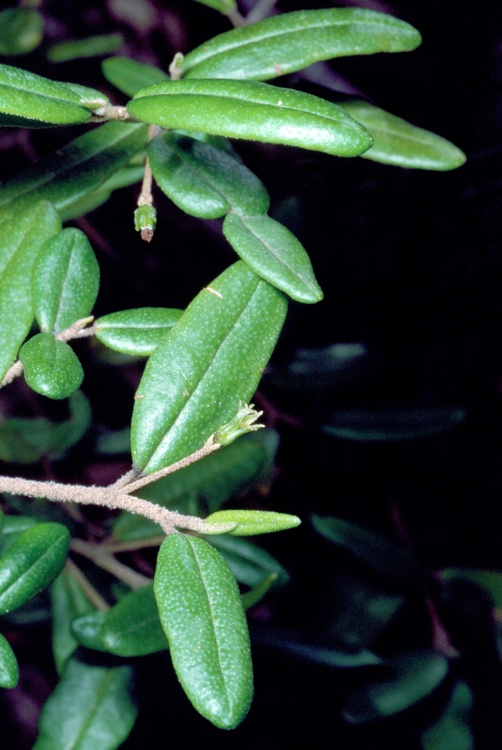
- In the Australian National Botanic Gardens

Scientific classification
- Kingdom: Plantae
- Clade: Tracheophytes
- Clade: Angiosperms
- Clade: Eudicots
- Clade: Rosids
- Order: Malpighiales
- Family: Euphorbiaceae
- Genus: Bertya
- Species: B. pomaderroides

Binomial name
- Bertya pomaderroides F.Muell.
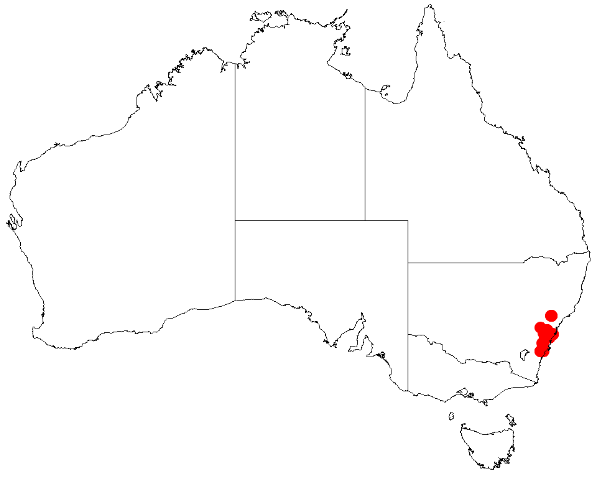
- Occurrence data from Australasian Virtual Herbarium

Synonyms
- Bertya oblongifolia Müll.Arg.; Bertya pomaderrioides F.Muell. orth. var.; Bertya pomaderroides var. angustifolia Blakely; Bertya pomaderroides F.Muell. var. pomaderroides

= Bertya pomaderroides =

Species of flowering plant

Bertya pomaderroides is a species of flowering plant in the family Euphorbiaceae and is endemic to New South Wales. It is a spreading shrub, usually with narrowly elliptic to oblong or narrowly oblong leaves, separate male and female flowers, and oval capsules, sometimes with star-shaped hairs.

== Description ==
Bertya pomaderroides is a spreading shrub with many branches and that typically grows to a height of up to 2 m (6 ft 7 in). Its young branchlets are covered with whitish or rust-covered hairs at first, but that later become glabrous. The leaves are mostly narrowly elliptic to oblong or narrowly oblong, 10–30 mm (0.39–1.18 in) long and 3–12 mm (0.12–0.47 in) wide. The upper surface is dark green and glabrous, the lower surface covered with woolly, whitish hairs. Separate male and female flowers are borne on a peduncle up to 15 mm (0.59 in) long, the male flowers with 55 to 55 stamens. Female flowers are sessile or on a pedicel up to 1.5 mm (0.059 in) long, with narrowly triangular sepals 2.1–2.7 mm (0.083–0.106 in) long with a more or less glabrous ovary. Flowering occurs throughout the year with a peak in September and October, and the fruit is a narrowly oval capsule 6.5–9.8 mm (0.26–0.39 in) long, sometimes with star-shaped hairs, and a single seed.

== Taxonomy ==
Bertya pomaderroides was first formally described in 1863 by Ferdinand von Mueller in his Fragmenta Phytographiae Australiae from specimens collected by William Woolls near Port Jackson.

== Distribution and habitat ==
This species of Bertya grows on sandy soils in open forest, usually near creeks or rivers, sometimes on steep hillsides, between Glenbrook and the Budawang Range in south-eastern New South Wales.
