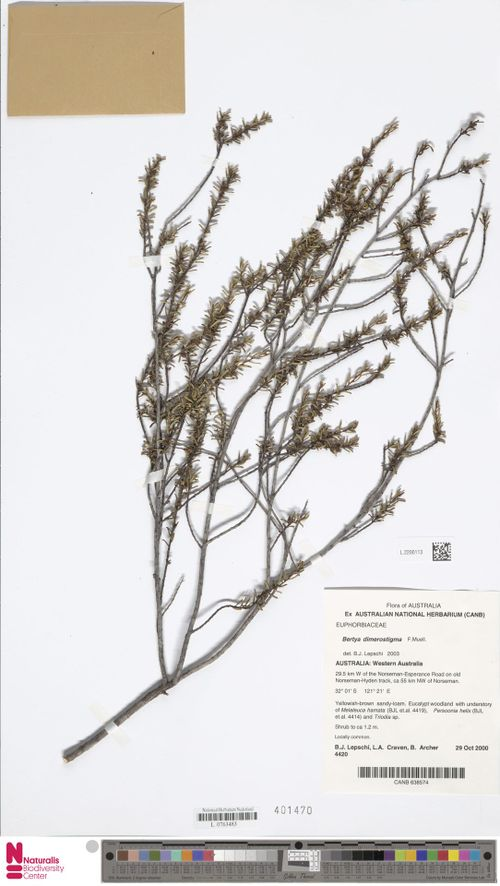
- Isotype in the Australian National Herbarium

Scientific classification
- Kingdom: Plantae
- Clade: Tracheophytes
- Clade: Angiosperms
- Clade: Eudicots
- Clade: Rosids
- Order: Malpighiales
- Family: Euphorbiaceae
- Genus: Bertya
- Species: B. dimerostigma

Binomial name
- Bertya dimerostigma F.Muell.
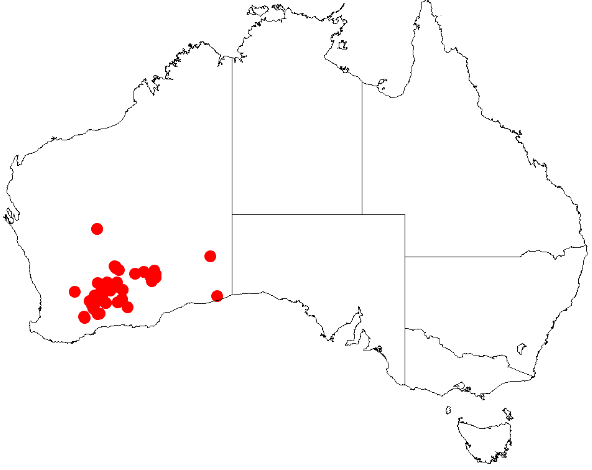
- Occurrence data from the Australasian Virtual Herbarium (22 June 2019)

Synonyms
- Bertya dimerostigma var. genuina Grüning

= Bertya dimerostigma =

Species of flowering plant

Bertya dimerostigma is a species of flowering plant in the family Euphorbiaceae and is endemic to inland southern Western Australia. It is an erect shrub with strap-like or narrowly oblong leaves, flowers borne singly in leaf axils, and oval capsules with a mottled, light brown seed.

== Description ==
Bertya dimerostigma is a monoecious or sometimes dioecious shrub that typically grows to a height of up to 2 m (6 ft 7 in) and has many glabrous, mostly sticky branches. Its leaves are strap-like or narrowly oblong, 6–10 mm (0.24–0.39 in) long and 0.9–1.4 mm (0.035–0.055 in) wide and sessile or on a short petiole. The upper surface of the leaves is green and glabrous, the lower surface white and densely covered with star-shaped hairs. The flowers are borne singly in leaf axils on a peduncle 0.5–2 mm (0.020–0.079 in) long. There are five or six oblong or narrowly egg-shaped bracts 1–4 mm (0.039–0.157 in) long and 0.5–0.9 mm (0.020–0.035 in) wide. Male flowers are sessile with five red egg-shaped or elliptic sepal lobes 2.8–5.1 mm (0.11–0.20 in) long and 2.2–2.7 mm (0.087–0.106 in) wide and have about 18 to 46 stamens. Female flowers are sessile, the five sepal lobes egg-shaped to broadly egg-shaped, 1.5–3.5 mm (0.059–0.138 in) long and 1.5–1.8 mm (0.059–0.071 in) wide. Female flowers usually have no petals, the ovary elliptic, and glabrous, the style about 0.2 mm (0.0079 in) long with three spreading yellowish-green limbs 1.1–1.5 mm (0.043–0.059 in) long, each with two to four lobes 0.9–1.1 mm (0.035–0.043 in) long. Flowering has been recorded mostly between June and November, and the fruit is an oval capsule 6–7 mm (0.24–0.28 in) long and 3.2–3.5 mm (0.13–0.14 in) wide with a single elliptic or oblong, light brown seed mottled with dark brown, 3.0–4.5 mm (0.12–0.18 in) long and 2.3–2.4 mm (0.091–0.094 in) wide with a yellowish-white caruncle.

== Taxonomy ==
Bertya dimerostigma was first formally described in 1882 by Ferdinand von Mueller in his Southern Science Record from specimens collected near Victoria Spring by Ernest Giles. The specific epithet (dimerostigma) means 'double stigma'.

== Distribution and habitat ==
This species of Bertya occurs in the south-west of Western Australia between Merredin, Hyden and Zanthus and is found in hummock grasslands, in mallee with a tall shrub understorey, and open woodland, growing on sands often overlaying clays.
