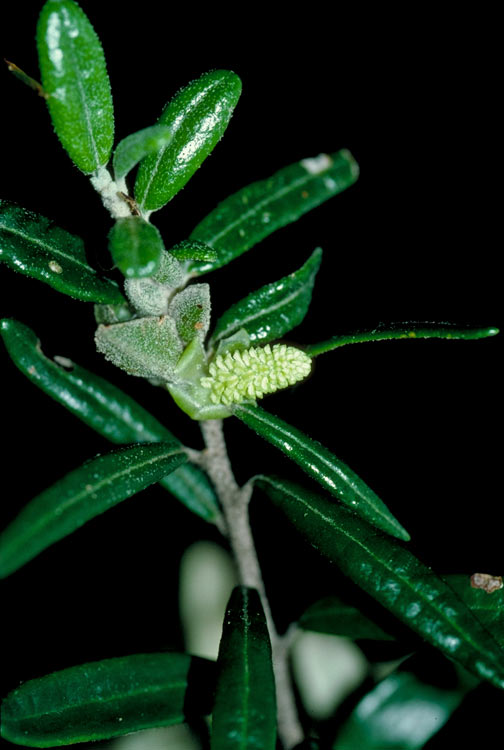

Scientific classification
- Kingdom: Plantae
- Clade: Tracheophytes
- Clade: Angiosperms
- Clade: Eudicots
- Clade: Rosids
- Order: Malpighiales
- Family: Euphorbiaceae
- Genus: Bertya
- Species: B. polystigma

Binomial name
- Bertya polystigma Grüning
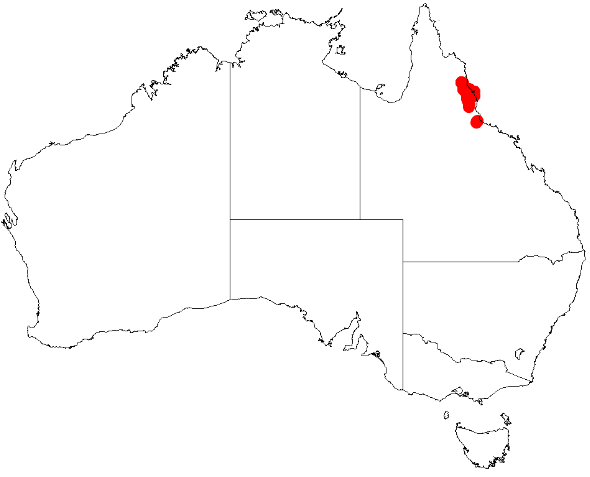
- Occurrence data from the Australasian Virtual Herbarium

= Bertya polystigma =

Species of flowering plant

Bertya polystigma is a species of flowering plant in the family Euphorbiaceae and is endemic to Queensland. It is a monoecious shrub with many branches, strap-like to narrowly oblong leaves, flowers borne singly or rarely in pairs, and elliptic capsules with a light brown to reddish-brown seed.

== Description ==
Bertya polystigma is a monoecious shrub that typically grows to a height of up to 3 m (9.8 ft) and has many branches. Its leaves are strap-like to narrowly oblong, 18–54 mm (0.71–2.13 in) long and 2.4–5.3 mm (0.094–0.209 in) wide on a petiole 1.2–4.5 mm (0.047–0.177 in) long. The upper surface of the leaves is green with a few star-shaped hairs, and the lower surface is white and densely covered with star-shaped hairs. The flowers are borne singly or rarely in pairs in leaf axils on a peduncle 1–4 mm (0.039–0.157 in) long. There are four to six strap-like to egg-shaped outer bracts 2.5–3.5 mm (0.098–0.138 in) long and 0.9–1.4 mm (0.035–0.055 in) wide and shorter inner bracts. Male flowers are on a pedicel 0.5–1 mm (0.020–0.039 in) long with five light green, oblong sepal lobes 4.5–5.1 mm (0.18–0.20 in) long and 2.5–2.9 mm (0.098–0.114 in) wide and have 57 to 73 stamens. Female flowers are sessile or on a short pedicel with five light green sepal lobes that are narrowly egg-shaped to egg-shaped, 0.9–3.1 mm (0.035–0.122 in) long and 1.0–1.6 mm (0.039–0.063 in) wide. Female flowers usually have no petals, the ovary is oval and 1.0–1.3 mm (0.039–0.051 in) long and 0.9–1 mm (0.035–0.039 in) wide, and the style is 0.3 mm (0.012 in) long with three or four spreading pale yellow or red limbs 2.4–3.5 mm (0.094–0.138 in) long, each with three to five lobes 1.3–3.0 mm (0.051–0.118 in) long. Flowering has been recorded from October to July, and the fruit is an elliptic capsule 5.9–7.1 mm (0.23–0.28 in) long and 3.5–3.8 mm (0.14–0.15 in) wide with a single oblong light brown to reddeish-brown seed 5.0–5.2 mm (0.20–0.20 in) long and 2.7–2.8 mm (0.11–0.11 in) wide with a creamy-white caruncle.

== Taxonomy ==
Bertya polystigma was first formally described in 1913 by Georg Grüning in Engler's Das Pflanzenreich from specimens collected by Ludwig Diels on Walshs Pyramid.

== Distribution and habitat ==
This species of Bertya grows in woodland or forest between the Windsor Tablelands and Ravenshoe in north Queensland.

== Conservation status ==
Bertya polystigma is listed as of "least concern" under the Queensland Government Nature Conservation Act 1992.
