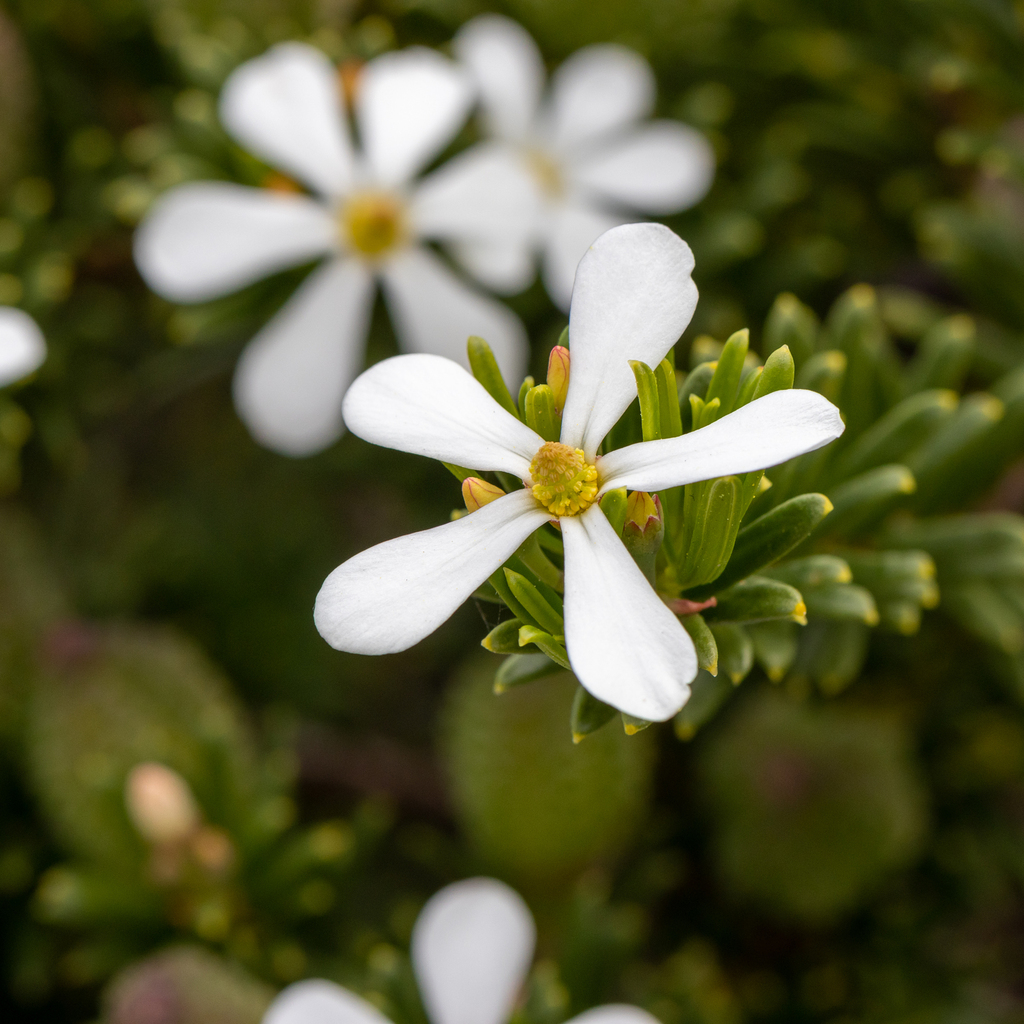

Scientific classification
- Kingdom: Plantae
- Clade: Tracheophytes
- Clade: Angiosperms
- Clade: Eudicots
- Clade: Rosids
- Order: Malpighiales
- Family: Euphorbiaceae
- Genus: Ricinocarpos
- Species: R. megalocarpus

Binomial name
- Ricinocarpos megalocarpus Halford & R.J.F.Hend.

= Ricinocarpos megalocarpus =

Species of shrub

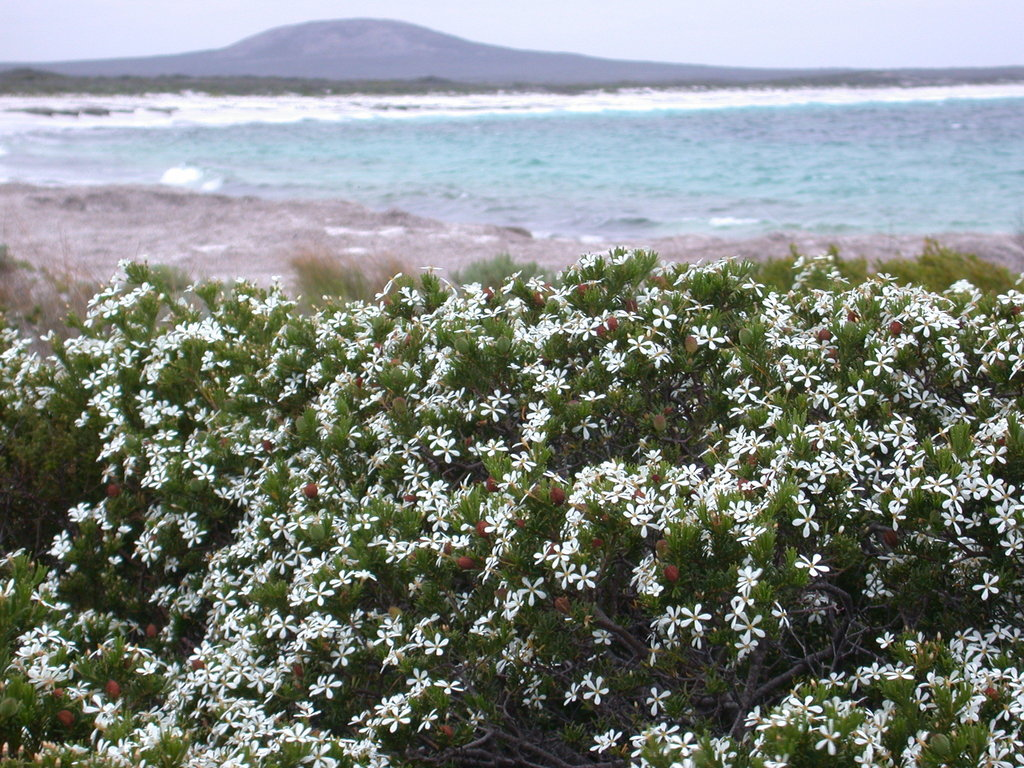
Habit in Cape Le Grand National Park

Ricinocarpos megalocarpus is a species of flowering plant in the family Euphorbiaceae and is endemic to the south coast of Western Australia. It is a compact, rounded, usually monoecious shrub with linear leaves and white flowers, arranged either singly, or male flowers in groups, or with a single female flower surrounded by up to six male flowers.

== Description ==
Ricinocarpos megalocarpus is a compact, rounded, usually monoecious, rarely dioecious shrub that typically grows to height of up to 2.5 m (8 ft 2 in), its young branchlets glabrous. The leaves are linear, 9–20 mm (0.35–0.79 in) long and 1.6–1.8 mm (0.063–0.071 in) wide on a glabrous petiole 1.5–2.0 mm (0.059–0.079 in) long. The upper surface of the leaves is smooth and glabrous and the lower surface is covered with soft, white hairs. The flowers are arranged either singly, in groups of male flowers, or by a single female flower surrounded by up to six male flowers. Male flowers are on a slender pedicel 8–22 mm (0.31–0.87 in) long, the sepals joined at the base, densely hairy on the inner surface, the sepal lobes 1.3–1.7 mm (0.051–0.067 in) long. The petals are white, glabrous and narrowly egg-shaped with the narrower end towards the base, 9.5–11 mm (0.37–0.43 in) long and 3.5–4.5 mm (0.14–0.18 in) wide. Each male flower has about 55 stamens. Female flowers are on a stout pedicel 4–15 mm (0.16–0.59 in) long, the petals 11–12 mm (0.43–0.47 in) long and 3.5–4.0 mm (0.14–0.16 in) wide. Flowering occurs from August to February, and the fruit is an oval capsule about 14–16 mm (0.55–0.63 in) long and 10–13 mm (0.39–0.51 in) wide.

== Taxonomy and naming ==
Ricinocarpos megalocarpus was first formally described in 2007 by David Halford and Rodney Henderson in the journal Austrobaileya from specimens collected by Paul Wilson in the Duke of Orleans Bay in Cape Le Grand National Park in 1968. The specific epithet (megalocarpus) means "large-fruited", referring to the fruits compared to those of the similar R. tuberculatus.

== Distribution and habitat ==
This species grows in heath on coastal sand dunes between Cape Le Grand and Cape Arid National Park, in the Esperance Plains, Mallee and Swan Coastal Plain bioregions of south-western Western Australia.
