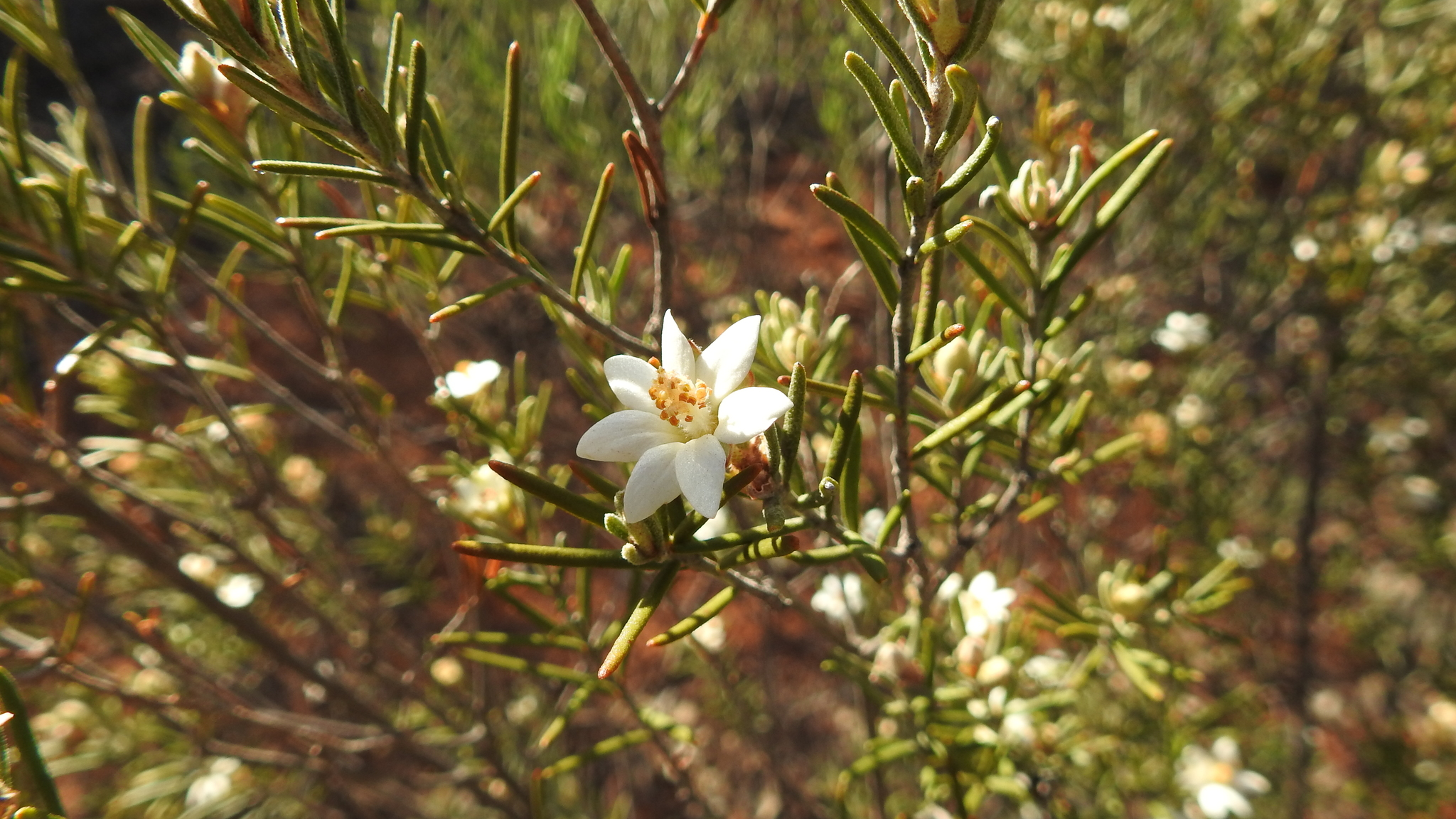
- Near Cobar

Scientific classification
- Kingdom: Plantae
- Clade: Tracheophytes
- Clade: Angiosperms
- Clade: Eudicots
- Clade: Rosids
- Order: Malpighiales
- Family: Euphorbiaceae
- Genus: Ricinocarpos
- Species: R. trachyphyllus

Binomial name
- Ricinocarpos trachyphyllus Halford & R.J.F.Hend.

= Ricinocarpos trachyphyllus =

Species of shrub

Ricinocarpos trachyphyllus is a species of flowering plant in the family Euphorbiaceae and is endemic to eastern Australia. It is an monoecious or dioecious shrub with linear leaves and white flowers, arranged either singly, or with 3 male flowers, or one female flower surrounded by three male flowers.

== Description ==
Ricinocarpos trachyphyllus is a monoecious or dioecious shrub that typically grows to up to a height 2 m (6 ft 7 in), its young branchlets densely covered with greyish-white, star-shaped hairs. The leaves are linear, 15–45 mm (0.59–1.77 in) long and 0.9–1.2 mm (0.035–0.047 in) wide on a densely hairy petiole 1.0–1.5 mm (0.039–0.059 in) long. The upper surface of the leaves is hairy at first, later glabrous and the lower surface is silky-hairy. The flowers are arranged either as a single male or female flower, with two or three female or two to six male flowers, or with a single female flower surrounded by two male flowers. Male flowers are on a slender pedicel 8–20 mm (0.31–0.79 in) long, the sepals joined at the base and densely hairy, the sepal lobes egg-shaped, 4.5–5.5 mm (0.18–0.22 in) long, the petals white and egg-shaped, 7–12 mm (0.28–0.47 in) long and 4.8–5.3 mm (0.19–0.21 in) wide. Each male flower has 30 to 50 stamens. Female flowers are on a stout, hairy pedicel 5–8 mm (0.20–0.31 in) long, the sepal lobes 5–6 mm (0.20–0.24 in) long and 2.8–4 mm (0.11–0.16 in) long and the petals white, more or less elliptic, 8–9 mm (0.31–0.35 in) long and glabrous. Flowering has been observed in March and from June to November, and the fruit is a more or less spherical capsule 8.0–8.3 mm (0.31–0.33 in) long and 8–9 mm (0.31–0.35 in) wide and covered with star-shaped hairs.

== Taxonomy and naming ==
Ricinocarpos trachyphyllus was first formally described in 2007 by David Halford and Rodney Henderson in the journal Austrobaileya from a specimen collected near Surat by Anthony Bean. The specific epithet (trachyphyllus) means "rough-leaved".

== Distribution and habitat ==
This species grows in open woodland or forest, or in mallee, mulga and spinifex, in two disjunct areas in Queensland and New South Wales. In Queensland it occurs between Charleville and Westmar and in New South Wales from near Cobar to Matakana.
