= Ricinocarpos pilifer =

Conservation status
- Priority Two — Poorly Known Taxa (DEC)

Scientific classification
- Kingdom: Plantae
- Clade: Tracheophytes
- Clade: Angiosperms
- Clade: Eudicots
- Clade: Rosids
- Order: Malpighiales
- Family: Euphorbiaceae
- Genus: Ricinocarpos
- Species: R. pilifer

Binomial name
- Ricinocarpos pilifer Halford & R.J.F.Hend.

Species of shrub

Ricinocarpos pilifer is a species of flowering plant in the family Euphorbiaceae and is endemic to a small area in the south-west of Western Australia. It is a compact monoecious shrub with narrowly oblong leaves and creamy white flowers arranged singly, or with two to four male flowers, or a single female flower with one or two male flowers.

== Description ==
Ricinocarpos pilifer is a compact monoecious shrub that typically grows to height of up to 60 cm (24 in), its young branchlets hairy. The leaves are narrowly oblong, 10–15 mm (0.39–0.59 in) long and 1.0–1.7 mm (0.039–0.067 in) wide. The upper surface of the leaves is glabrous and the lower surface is covered with silky hairs. The flowers are arranged on the ends of branchlets either singly, with two to four male flowers, or a single female flower one or two male flowers. Each flower has 5 sepals joined at the base and 5 creamy white petals. Male flowers are on a slender pedicel 5–13 mm (0.20–0.51 in) long, the sepal lobes 1.8–2.3 mm (0.071–0.091 in) long and 0.8–1 mm (0.031–0.039 in) wide. The petals of male flowers are 6.2–8.0 mm (0.24–0.31 in) long and 1.7–2.1 mm (0.067–0.083 in) wide and there are 20 to 30 stamens in a central column 2.0–2.7 mm (0.079–0.106 in) long. Female flowers are on a stout pedicel 2–6 mm (0.079–0.236 in) long, the sepal lobes 2.5–2.7 mm (0.098–0.106 in) long and 0.9–1.2 mm (0.035–0.047 in) wide. Flowering has been observed in August and October, and the fruit is an elliptic capsule about 7 mm (0.28 in) long.

== Taxonomy and naming ==
Ricinocarpos pilifer was first formally described in 2007 by David Halford and Rodney John Francis Henderson in the journal Austrobaileya from specimens collected on Mount Le Grand in the Cape Le Grand National Park in 1966. The specific epithet (pilifer) means "bearing hairs", referring to the ovary and fruit of this species.

== Distribution and habitat ==
This species is only known from Mount Le Grand where it grows in scrub on thin soil on a rocky outcrop.

== Conservation status ==
Ricinocarpos pilifer is listed as "Priority Two" by the Western Australian Government Department of Biodiversity, Conservation and Attractions, meaning that it is poorly known and from only one or a few locations.
