= Ricinocarpos trichophyllus =

Conservation status
- Priority One — Poorly Known Taxa (DEC)

Scientific classification
- Kingdom: Plantae
- Clade: Tracheophytes
- Clade: Angiosperms
- Clade: Eudicots
- Clade: Rosids
- Order: Malpighiales
- Family: Euphorbiaceae
- Genus: Ricinocarpos
- Species: R. trichophyllus

Binomial name
- Ricinocarpos trichophyllus Halford & R.J.F.Hend.

Species of shrub

Ricinocarpos trichophyllus is a species of flowering plant in the family Euphorbiaceae and is endemic to north-western Australia. It is an open, slender, monoecious shrub with linear to narrowly oblong leaves, and flowers in a raceme with one female flower surrounded by two or three male flowers.

== Description ==
Ricinocarpos trichophyllus is an open, slender, monoecious shrub that typically grows to a height of 0.7–1.5 m (2 ft 4 in – 4 ft 11 in), its young branchlets covered with white, star-shaped hairs. The leaves are linear to narrowly oblong, 22–45 mm (0.87–1.77 in) long, 1.4–3.5 mm (0.055–0.138 in) wide with the edges turned down or rolled under on a short petiole. Both surfaces of the leaves are sometimes densely covered with soft hairs. The flowers are arranged on the ends of branchlets with one female flowers surrounded by two or three male flowers. Each flower has 5 sepals joined at the base and 5 petals twice as long as the sepals, but the colour of the flowers has not been observed. Male flowers are on a slender pedicel 2.5–10 mm (0.098–0.394 in) long, the sepal lobes 3.0–3.5 mm (0.12–0.14 in) long and 2.0–2.5 mm (0.079–0.098 in) wide. The petals of male flowers are 1.9–3 mm (0.075–0.118 in) long and 1.2–2.2 mm (0.047–0.087 in) wide and there are about 25 stamens. Female flowers are on a stout pedicel 4–7 mm (0.16–0.28 in) long, the sepal lobes 2.7–3 mm (0.11–0.12 in) long and 2.2–2.6 mm (0.087–0.102 in) wide, the petals 2.3–2.5 mm (0.091–0.098 in) long and 1.0–1.3 mm (0.039–0.051 in) wide. Flowering has been observed in February, May and August, and the fruit is a more or less spherical capsule, 6–8 mm (0.24–0.31 in) long and 7.5–10 mm (0.30–0.39 in) wide.

== Taxonomy and naming ==
Ricinocarpos trichophyllus was first formally described in 2007 by David Halford and Rodney John Francis Henderson in the journal Austrobaileya, from specimens collected near Nancy's Gorge in the Spirit Hills Conservation Area in the Victoria River region of the Northern Territory in 1996. The specific epithet (trichophyllus) means "hairy leaved".

== Distribution and habitat ==
This species grows in shrubland and woodland in the Drysdale River National Park in the Kimberley region of Western Australia and in the Moyle and Victoria River regions of the Northern Territory.

== Conservation status ==
Ricinocarpos trichophyllus is listed as "Priority One" by the Government of Western Australia Department of Biodiversity, Conservation and Attractions, meaning that it is known from only one or a few locations which are potentially at risk.
