= Ricinocarpos graniticus =

Scientific classification
- Kingdom: Plantae
- Clade: Tracheophytes
- Clade: Angiosperms
- Clade: Eudicots
- Clade: Rosids
- Order: Malpighiales
- Family: Euphorbiaceae
- Genus: Ricinocarpos
- Species: R. graniticus

Binomial name
- Ricinocarpos graniticus Halford & R.J.F.Hend.

Species of shrub

Ricinocarpos graniticus is a species of flowering plant in the family Euphorbiaceae and is endemic to the southwest of Western Australia. It is a monoecious shrub with linear leaves and creamy white flowers, arranged either singly, or with a single female flower surrounded by one or two male flowers.

== Description ==
Ricinocarpos graniticus is a monoecious shrub that typically grows to height of up to 2 m (6 ft 7 in), its young branchlets glabrous. The leaves are linear, 15–40 mm (0.59–1.57 in) long and 1.2–1.5 mm (0.047–0.059 in) wide on a glabrous petiole 1–2 mm (0.039–0.079 in) long. The upper surface of the leaves is smooth and glabrous and the lower surface is covered with woolly white hairs. The flowers are arranged either as a single male or female flower, or with a single female flower surrounded by one or two male flowers. Male flowers are on a slender pedicel 6–9 mm (0.24–0.35 in) long, the sepals joined at the base and more or less glabrous, the sepal lobes egg-shaped, 4.0–4.2 mm (0.16–0.17 in) long, the petals creamy white and lance-shaped or oblong, 6–8 mm (0.24–0.31 in) long and 1.5–2.4 mm (0.059–0.094 in) wide. Each male flower has about 35 stamens. Female flowers are on a stout pedicel 5–10 mm (0.20–0.39 in) long. Flowering has been observed from June to September, and the fruit is an elliptic capsule about 7 mm (0.28 in) in diameter.

== Taxonomy and naming ==
Ricinocarpos graniticus was first formally described in 2007 by David Halford and Rodney Henderson in the journal Austrobaileya from specimens collected in the Darling Range in 2004. The specific epithet (graniticus) means "living on "granitic soil", referring to the granite rock outcrops where this species is found.

== Distribution and habitat ==
This species grows in low scrub on granite outcrops on the Darling Range, with a disjunct population near Newdegate, in the Avon Wheatbelt, Jarrah Forest, Mallee and Swan Coastal Plain bioregions of south-western Western Australia.
