= Ricinocarpos oliganthus =

Conservation status
- Priority One — Poorly Known Taxa (DEC)

Scientific classification
- Kingdom: Plantae
- Clade: Tracheophytes
- Clade: Angiosperms
- Clade: Eudicots
- Clade: Rosids
- Order: Malpighiales
- Family: Euphorbiaceae
- Genus: Ricinocarpos
- Species: R. oliganthus

Binomial name
- Ricinocarpos oliganthus Halford & R.J.F.Hend.

Species of shrub

Ricinocarpos oliganthus is a species of flowering plant in the family Euphorbiaceae and is endemic to a small area in the south-west of Western Australia. It is a monoecious shrub with linear to narrowly oblong leaves and white to creamy white flowers arranged singly on the ends of branchlets.

== Description ==
Ricinocarpos oliganthus is a monoecious shrub that typically grows to height of up to about 1.8 m (5 ft 11 in), its young branchlets more or less glabrous. The leaves are linear to narrowly oblong, 6–10 mm (0.24–0.39 in) long and 0.8–1.3 mm (0.031–0.051 in) wide. The upper surface of the leaves is glabrous and the lower surface is covered with white, star-shaped hairs. The flowers are arranged singly on the ends of branchlets with 5 sepals joined at the base and 5 white to creamy white petals. Male flowers are on a slender pedicel 3–5 mm (0.12–0.20 in) long, the sepal lobes 3.0–3.5 mm (0.12–0.14 in) long and 1.5–2.0 mm (0.059–0.079 in) wide. The petals of male flowers are 7.0–7.5 mm (0.28–0.30 in) long and about 2.8 mm (0.11 in) wide and there are about 45 stamens in a central column about 3 mm (0.12 in) long. Female flowers are on a stout pedicel 3–4 mm (0.12–0.16 in) long, the sepal lobes 3.0–3.5 mm (0.12–0.14 in) long and 2.0–2.4 mm (0.079–0.094 in) wide. The petals of female flowers are 4.0–4.2 mm (0.16–0.17 in) long and 1.5–2.2 mm (0.059–0.087 in) wide. Flowering has been observed in June, and the fruit is an elliptic capsule 7.5–8.0 mm (0.30–0.31 in) long.

== Taxonomy and naming ==
Ricinocarpos oliganthus was first formally described in 2007 by David Halford and Rodney John Francis Henderson in the journal Austrobaileya from specimens collected near the Canna siding in 1996. The specific epithet (oliganthus) means "few-flowered".

== Distribution and habitat ==
This species grows is only known from near Morawa in the Avon Wheatbelt bioregion of south-western Western Australia, where it grows in scrub with mallee eucalypts.

== Conservation status ==
Ricinocarpos oliganthus is listed as "Priority One" by the Western Australian Government Department of Biodiversity, Conservation and Attractions, meaning that it is known from only one or a few locations that are potentially at risk.
