= Ricinocarpos verrucosus =

Scientific classification
- Kingdom: Plantae
- Clade: Tracheophytes
- Clade: Angiosperms
- Clade: Eudicots
- Clade: Rosids
- Order: Malpighiales
- Family: Euphorbiaceae
- Genus: Ricinocarpos
- Species: R. verrucosus

Binomial name
- Ricinocarpos verrucosus Halford & R.J.F.Hend.

Species of shrub

Ricinocarpos verrucosus is a species of flowering plant in the family Euphorbiaceae and is endemic to north-eastern Queensland. It is an monoecious shrub with very narrowly elliptic or narrowly lance-shaped leaves, and flowers usually arranged with one or two female flowers with eight to twenty male flowers above them.

== Description ==
Ricinocarpos verrucosus is a monoecious shrub that typically grows to up to a height 4 m (13 ft), and has many stems, its young branchlets glabrous. The leaves are very narrowly elliptic or narrowly lance-shaped, 45–100 mm (1.8–3.9 in) long and 2–4 mm (0.079–0.157 in) wide on a glabrous petiole 1.4–2 mm (0.055–0.079 in) long. The upper surface of the leaves is glabrous and the lower surface is covered with soft, star-shaped hairs. The flowers are usually arranged with one or two female flowers with eight to twenty male flowers above them. Male flowers are on a slender pedicel 2–3 mm (0.079–0.118 in) long, the four sepals joined at the base and more or less glabrous, the sepal lobes egg-shaped to elliptic, 2.5–3.3 mm (0.098–0.130 in) long. Each male flower has about 40 stamens. Female flowers are on a stout, hairy pedicel 5–10 mm (0.20–0.39 in) long, the sepal lobes 3.4–4.2 mm (0.13–0.17 in) long and 1.5–2.0 mm (0.059–0.079 in) long. Flowering has been observed in February, May, and from September to November, and the fruit is a capsule 6–8 mm (0.24–0.31 in) long and 9–10 mm (0.35–0.39 in) wide and warty.

== Taxonomy and naming ==
Ricinocarpos verrucosus was first formally described in 2007 by David Halford and Rodney Henderson in the journal Austrobaileya from a specimen collected by Henderson at Mount Alto, 4 km (2.5 mi) south-south-west of Mount Carbine in 1989. The specific epithet (verrucosus) means "warty", referring to the texture of the surface of the fruit.

== Distribution and habitat ==
This species grows among granite boulders on rocky hillsides or on the banks of rocky streams in open woodland, in Cape Melville National Park and around Mount Carbine in north-eastern Queensland.
