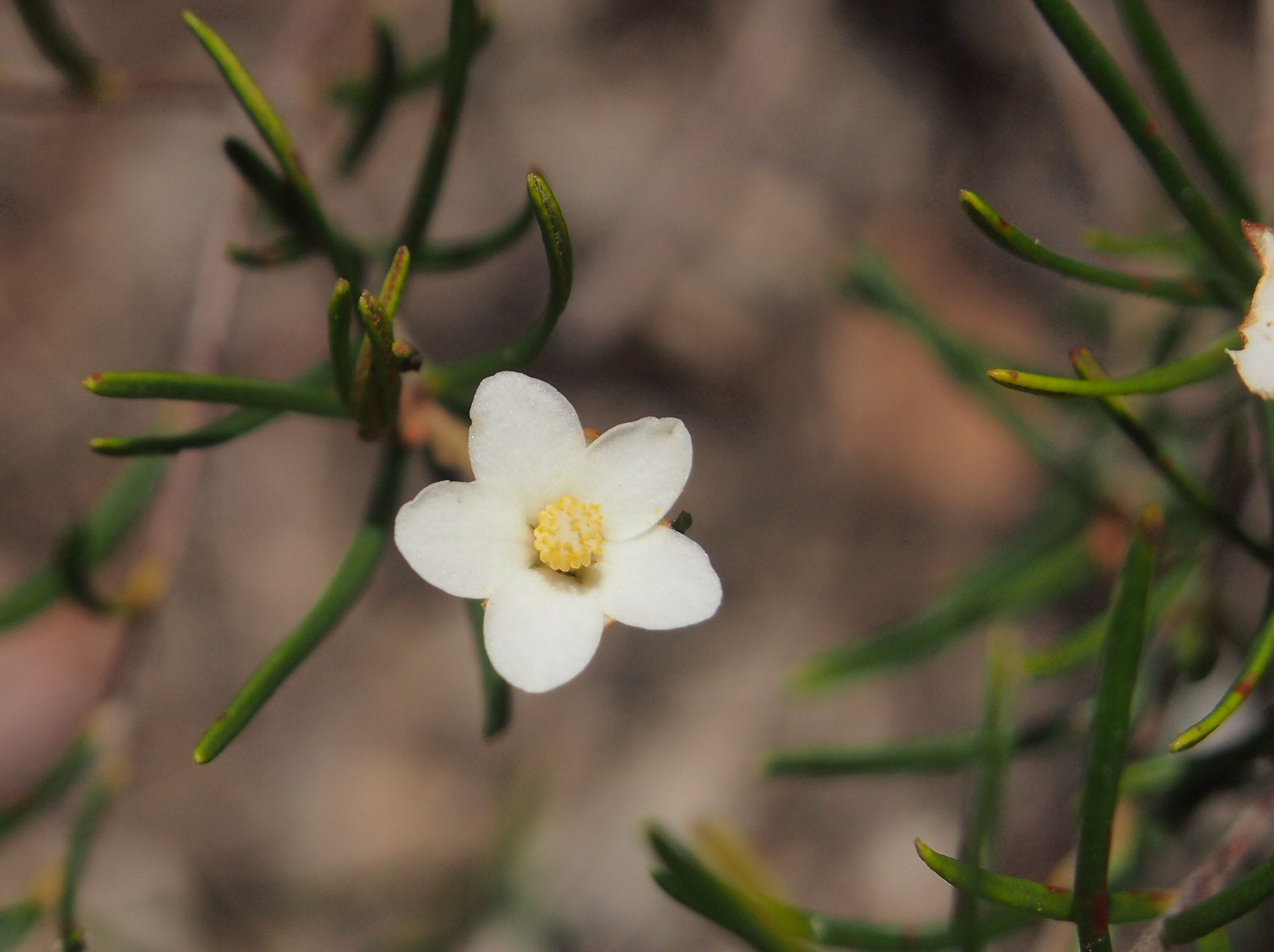
- I the Blackdown Tableland National Park

Scientific classification
- Kingdom: Plantae
- Clade: Tracheophytes
- Clade: Angiosperms
- Clade: Eudicots
- Clade: Rosids
- Order: Malpighiales
- Family: Euphorbiaceae
- Genus: Ricinocarpos
- Species: R. linearifolius

Binomial name
- Ricinocarpos linearifolius Halford & R.J.F.Hend.

= Ricinocarpos linearifolius =

Species of shrub

Ricinocarpos linearifolius is a species of flowering plant in the family Euphorbiaceae and is endemic to eastern Australia. It is a monoecious or dioecious shrub with hairy young branchlets, linear leaves and white flowers, arranged either singly, with two to four male flowers, or a single female flower surrounded by up to three male flowers.

== Description ==
Ricinocarpos linearifolius is a monoecious or dioecious shrub that typically grows to a height of up to 1 m (3 ft 3 in), its young branchlets densely covered with greyish-white, star-shaped hairs. The leaves are linear, 15–45 mm (0.59–1.77 in) long and 1.0–1.3 mm (0.039–0.051 in) wide on a densely hairy petiole 0.8–1.5 mm (0.031–0.059 in) long. The upper surface of the leaves quickly becomes glabrous and the lower surface is densely covered with silky hairs, so that only the midrib is visible. The flowers are arranged either as a single male or female flower, or as clusters of two to four male flowers, or with a single female flower surrounded by up to three male flowers. Male flowers are on a slender, densely hairy pedicel 4–15 mm (0.16–0.59 in) long, the sepals joined at the base and densely hairy, the sepal lobes egg-shaped, 3.0–4.5 mm (0.12–0.18 in) long. The petals are white and egg-shaped with the narrower end towards the base to round, 6.2–10 mm (0.24–0.39 in) long and 4.2–5.5 mm (0.17–0.22 in) wide. Each male flower has 40 to 50 stamens. Female flowers are on a stout, hairy pedicel 5–20 mm (0.20–0.79 in) long, the sepal lobes egg-shaped, 4–5 mm (0.16–0.20 in) long and 2.2–3.0 mm (0.087–0.118 in) wide. The petals are white and egg-shaped with the narrower end towards the base, and 7.5–9.3 mm (0.30–0.37 in) long with smooth edges. Flowering occurs throughout the year with a peak from August to October, and the fruit is a more or less spherical capsule 8.0–9.5 mm (0.31–0.37 in) in diameter and covered with star-shaped hairs.

== Taxonomy and naming ==
Ricinocarpos linearifolius was first formally described in 2007 by David Halford and Rodney Henderson in the journal Austrobaileya from specimens collected by Henderson in the northern end of the Blackdown Tableland National Park in 1987. The specific epithet (linearifolius) means "linear-leaved".

== Distribution and habitat ==
This species grows in heath, woodland and open forest between Jericho, Biggenden and Inglewood in Queensland, and near Warialda in New South Wales.
