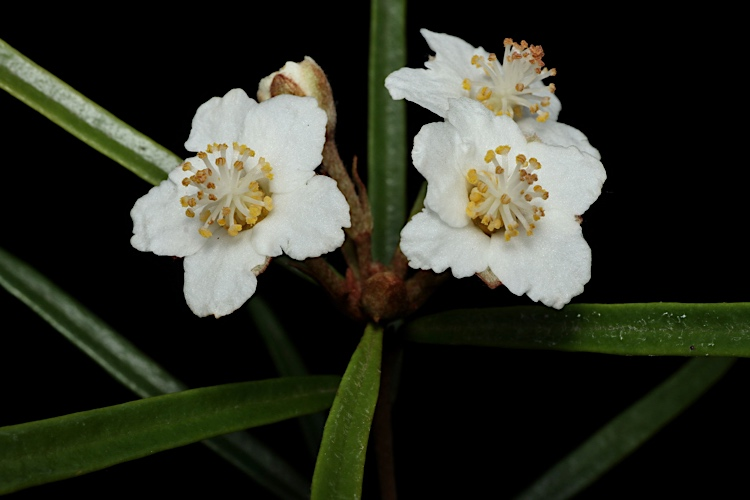
- Male flowers

Scientific classification
- Kingdom: Plantae
- Clade: Tracheophytes
- Clade: Angiosperms
- Clade: Eudicots
- Clade: Rosids
- Order: Malpighiales
- Family: Euphorbiaceae
- Genus: Ricinocarpos
- Species: R. caniana

Binomial name
- Ricinocarpos caniana Halford & R.J.F.Hend.

= Ricinocarpos caniana =

Species of shrub

Ricinocarpos caniana is a species of flowering plant in the family Euphorbiaceae and is endemic to a restricted area of south-eastern Queensland. It is an erect monoecious or dioecious shrub with linear leaves and white flowers, arranged either singly, with two to five male flowers, or a single female flower surrounded by up to four male flowers.

== Description ==
Ricinocarpos caniana is an erect, monoecious or dioecious shrub that typically grows to height of up to 2 m (6 ft 7 in), its young branchlets densely covered with greyish-white, star-shaped hairs. The leaves are linear, 45–100 mm (1.8–3.9 in) long and 2–4 mm (0.079–0.157 in) wide on a densely hairy petiole 2.5–4 mm (0.098–0.157 in) long. The upper surface of the leaves soon becomes glabrous and the lower surface is silky-hairy. The flowers are arranged either as a single male or female flower, or as clusters of two to five male flowers, or with a single female flower surrounded by up to four male flowers. Male flowers are on a slender, densely hairy pedicel 9–17 mm (0.35–0.67 in) long, the sepals joined at the base and densely hairy, the sepal lobes egg-shaped to elliptic and 4.3–5.8 mm (0.17–0.23 in) long, the petals white and egg-shaped, 9 mm (0.35 in) long and 4.7 mm (0.19 in) wide. Each male flower has about 50 stamens. Female flowers are on a stout, hairy pedicel 7–14 mm (0.28–0.55 in) long, the sepal lobes 4.5–5.0 mm (0.18–0.20 in) long and 2.2–3.0 mm (0.087–0.118 in) long and the petals white and egg-shaped with the narrower end towards the base and 7.0–7.5 mm (0.28–0.30 in) long. Flowering has been observed in August, and the fruit is a more or less spherical capsule 10–11 mm (0.39–0.43 in) in diameter and covered with star-shaped hairs.

== Taxonomy and naming ==
Ricinocarpos caniana was first formally described in 2007 by David Halford and Rodney Henderson in the journal Austrobaileya from specimens collected in Cania Gorge National Park in 1999. The specific epithet (caniana) is derived from the name of the type location.

== Distribution and habitat ==
This species is only known from the type location in south-eastern Queensland, where it grows in forest with a dense shrubby understorey, between sandstone rocks on a steep scree slope.
