= Ricinocarpos brevis =

Conservation status
- Declared rare (DEC)

Scientific classification
- Kingdom: Plantae
- Clade: Tracheophytes
- Clade: Angiosperms
- Clade: Eudicots
- Clade: Rosids
- Order: Malpighiales
- Family: Euphorbiaceae
- Genus: Ricinocarpos
- Species: R. brevis

Binomial name
- Ricinocarpos brevis R.J.F.Hend. & Mollemans

Species of shrub

Ricinocarpos brevis is a species of flowering plant in the family Euphorbiaceae and is endemic to inland Western Australia. It is a monoecious, densely-branched shrub with narrowly oblong leaves and male and female flowers arranged singly or in small groups.

== Description ==
Ricinocarpos brevis is a monoecious shrub that typically grows to height of 1.0–1.8 m (3 ft 3 in – 5 ft 11 in) and is densely and intricately branched. The leaves are densely hairy and narrowly oblong, mostly 7–30 mm (0.28–1.18 in) long and 1.4–2.0 mm (0.055–0.079 in) wide on a short petiole. The flowers are arranged singly, or with two female, or one female and one or two male flowers. The flowers are conspicuous and arranged on a pedicel densely covered with woolly white, star-shaped hairs. Male flowers are on a thin pedicel 4–8 mm (0.16–0.31 in) long, the sepals covered with woolly, white, star-shaped hairs. Male flowers have egg-shaped, white petals outlined in red, 4.3–5.8 mm (0.17–0.23 in) long and 2.5–3.2 mm (0.098–0.126 in) wide. Female flowers are usually on a stout pedicel 2–5 mm (0.079–0.197 in) long, the sepals densely hairy, the petals white but turning brown, 2.3–4.1 mm (0.091–0.161 in) long and 1.5–1.8 mm (0.059–0.071 in) wide. Flowering has been observed in June, July and November, and the fruit is an elliptic or oval capsule 8–9 mm (0.31–0.35 in) long and covered with star-shaped hairs.

== Taxonomy and naming ==
Ricinocarpos brevis was first formally described in 2007 by Rodney John Francis Henderson and Frans Hendricus Mollemans in the journal Austrobaileya, from specimens collected north of Southern Cross in 1990.

== Distribution and habitat ==
This species grows in shrubland on rocky hills and outcrops, and is only known from the Windarling Range north of Southern Cross, at altitudes between 500 and 550 m (1,640 and 1,800 ft).

== Conservation status ==
Ricinocarpos brevis is listed as "Threatened" by the Western Australian Government Department of Biodiversity, Conservation and Attractions.
