= Acacia hendersonii =

Scientific classification
- Kingdom: Plantae
- Clade: Tracheophytes
- Clade: Angiosperms
- Clade: Eudicots
- Clade: Rosids
- Order: Fabales
- Family: Fabaceae
- Subfamily: Caesalpinioideae
- Clade: Mimosoid clade
- Genus: Acacia
- Species: A. hendersonii

Binomial name
- Acacia hendersonii Pedley

Synonyms
- Acacia sp. (Blackdown Tableland R.J.Henderson+ 1199); Racosperma hendersonii (Pedley) Pedley

Species of legume

Acacia hendersonii is a species of flowering plant in the family Fabaceae and is endemic to Queensland, Australia. It is a spreading, much-branched, glabrous shrub with linear to moderately curved or s-shaped phyllodes, spherical heads of light golden yellow flowers and narrowly oblong, firmly papery pods.

== Description ==
Acacia hendersonii is a spreading, much-branched, glabrous shrub that typically grows to a height of up to 3 m (9.8 ft) and is slightly resinous. Its phyllodes are flat but thick, linear, straight or moderately curved or distinctly s-shaped, 15–22 mm (0.59–0.87 in) long and 0.7–1.1 mm (0.028–0.043 in) wide with one prominent vein on each side. There are tapering stipules 0.8–1.1 mm (0.031–0.043 in) long at the base of the phyllodes. The flowers are borne in a spherical head in axils on a peduncle 9–15 mm (0.35–0.59 in) long, each head with 30 to 35 light golden yellow flowers. Flowering has been recorded in August and September and the pods are narrowly oblong, firmly papery, 5–7 mm (0.20–0.28 in) wide.

== Taxonomy ==
Acacia hendersonii was first formally described in 1999 by the botanist Leslie Pedley in the journal Austrobaileya from specimens collected on the Blackdown Tableland, about 32 km (20 mi) south-east of Blackwater in 1971. The specific epithet (hendersonii) honours Rodney John Francis Henderson, "who not only was joint collector of the type on the first organised expedition to collect plants of the Blackdown Tableland, but also a noted systematist specialising in Liliaceae".

This species is part of the Acacia johnsonii group, and it is also similar to the more common Acacia resinicostata.

== Distribution and habitat ==
This species of wattle is confined to the Blackdown tableland where it grows in scrub, open forest and woodland in stony clay and sandy soils, often on rocky sandstone.

== Conservation status ==
Acacia hendersonii is listed as of "least concern" under the Queensland Government Nature Conservation Act 1992.

== See also ==
- List of Acacia species
