= Ricinocarpos crispatus =

Scientific classification
- Kingdom: Plantae
- Clade: Tracheophytes
- Clade: Angiosperms
- Clade: Eudicots
- Clade: Rosids
- Order: Malpighiales
- Family: Euphorbiaceae
- Genus: Ricinocarpos
- Species: R. crispatus

Binomial name
- Ricinocarpos crispatus Halford & R.J.F.Hend.

Species of shrub

Ricinocarpos crispatus is a species of flowering plant in the family Euphorbiaceae and is endemic to south-western Queensland. It is a monoecious or dioecious shrub with linear leaves and white flowers, arranged either singly, with two to four male flowers, or a single female flower surrounded by one or two male flowers.

== Description ==
Ricinocarpos crispatus is a monoecious or dioecious shrub that typically grows to a height of up to 2 m (6 ft 7 in), its young branchlets densely covered with greyish-white, star-shaped hairs. The leaves are linear, 15–25 mm (0.59–0.98 in) long and 1–2 mm (0.039–0.079 in) wide on a densely hairy petiole 1.2–3 mm (0.047–0.118 in) long. The upper surface of the leaves becomes glabrous and the lower surface is woolly-hairy. The flowers are arranged either as a single male or female flower, or as clusters of two to four male flowers, or with a single female flower surrounded by one or two male flowers. Male flowers are on a slender, densely hairy pedicel 3–14 mm (0.12–0.55 in) long, the sepals joined at the base and densely hairy, the sepal lobes egg-shaped, 3–4 mm (0.12–0.16 in) long, the petals white and egg-shaped with the narrower end towards the base, 4–5 mm (0.16–0.20 in) long and 2.3–2.6 mm (0.091–0.102 in) wide with wavy or curly edges. Each male flower has 20 to 30 stamens. Female flowers are on a stout, hairy pedicel 3–12 mm (0.12–0.47 in) long, the sepal lobes 3.4–4.0 mm (0.13–0.16 in) long and 1.8–2.1 mm (0.071–0.083 in) wide and the petals white and egg-shaped with the narrower end towards the base and 3.8–4.1 mm (0.15–0.16 in) long with wavy or curly edges. Flowering has been observed in August and December, and the fruit is a flattened spherical capsule about 5 mm (0.20 in) in diameter and covered with star-shaped hairs.

== Taxonomy and naming ==
Ricinocarpos crispatus was first formally described in 2007 by David Halford and Rodney Henderson in the journal Austrobaileya from specimens collected in Mariala National Park in 1991. The specific epithet (crispatus) means irregularly waved and twisted, referring to the edges of the petals of this species.

== Distribution and habitat ==
This species grows in shrubland on the slopes and crests of low tablelands, approximately in the area between Blackall, Quilpie and Charleville in south-western Queensland.
