= Ricinocarpos ruminatus =

Scientific classification
- Kingdom: Plantae
- Clade: Tracheophytes
- Clade: Angiosperms
- Clade: Eudicots
- Clade: Rosids
- Order: Malpighiales
- Family: Euphorbiaceae
- Genus: Ricinocarpos
- Species: R. ruminatus

Binomial name
- Ricinocarpos ruminatus Halford & R.J.F.Hend.

Species of shrub

Ricinocarpos ruminatus is a species of flowering plant in the family Euphorbiaceae and is endemic to the Expedition Range in central Queensland. It is an erect, monoecious shrub with linear leaves and white flowers, arranged on the ends of branches with 2 to 5 male flowers, or a female flower surrounded by up to 4 male flowers.

== Description ==
Ricinocarpos ruminatus is an erect, monoecious shrub that typically grows to height of up to 2 m (6 ft 7 in), its young branchlets glabrous. The leaves are linear, 20–35 mm (0.79–1.38 in) long and 0.7–1.3 mm (0.028–0.051 in) wide on a glabrous petiole 1.5–2.0 mm (0.059–0.079 in) long. The upper surface of the leaves is smooth and glabrous and the lower surface is covered with soft, white hairs. The flowers are arranged on the ends of branches in groups of 2 to 5 male flowers, or by a single female flower surrounded by up to 4 male flowers. Male flowers are on a slender pedicel 12–40 mm (0.47–1.57 in) long, the 5 sepals joined at the base, hairy on the inner surface, the sepal lobes egg-shaped, 1.3–1.8 mm (0.051–0.071 in) long. The 5 petals are white, glabrous and narrowly egg-shaped with the narrower end towards the base, 10–13 mm (0.39–0.51 in) long and 3.0–3.7 mm (0.12–0.15 in) wide. Each male flower has 20–30 stamens. Flowering has been observed in August and December, and the fruit is a more or less spherical capsule 14–16 mm (0.55–0.63 in) in diameter.

== Taxonomy and naming ==
Ricinocarpos ruminatus was first formally described in 2007 by David Halford and Rodney Henderson in the journal Austrobaileya from specimens collected by Anthony Bean near Rolleston in 1998. The specific epithet (ruminatus) means "penetrated by irregular canals", referring to the texture of the Elaiosome on the seeds.

== Distribution and habitat ==
This species grows in open forest and heath. It is only known from the Expedition Range near Rolleston.
