= Acacia webbii =

Scientific classification
- Kingdom: Plantae
- Clade: Embryophytes
- Clade: Tracheophytes
- Clade: Angiosperms
- Clade: Eudicots
- Clade: Rosids
- Order: Fabales
- Family: Fabaceae
- Subfamily: Caesalpinioideae
- Clade: Mimosoid clade
- Genus: Acacia
- Species: A. webbii

Binomial name
- Acacia webbii Pedley
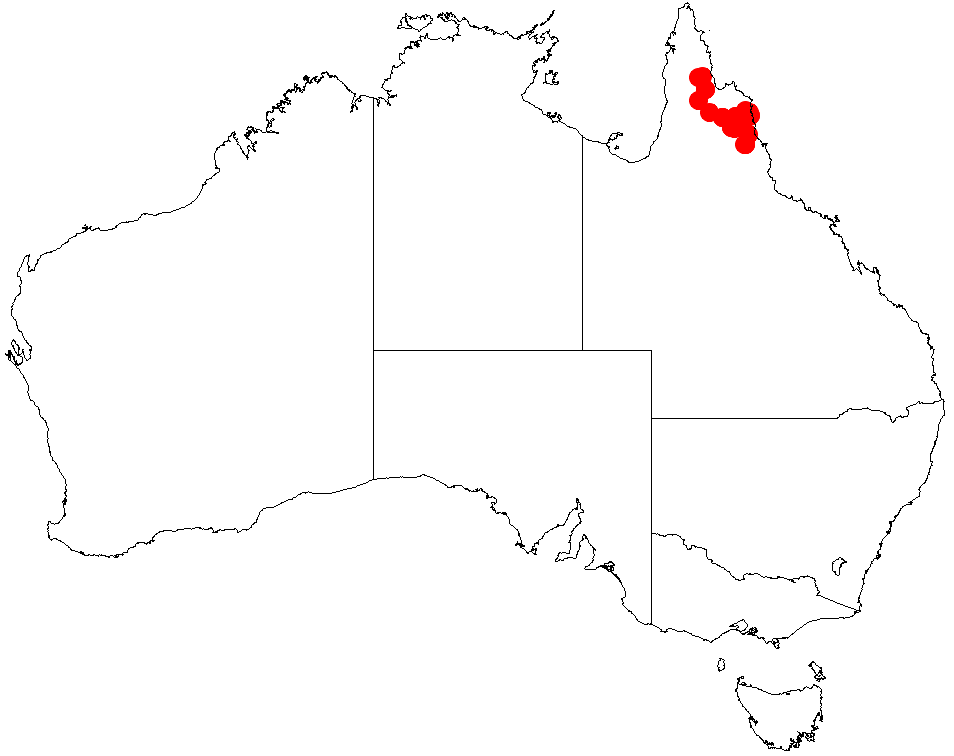
- Occurrence data from AVH

Species of legume

Acacia webbii is a shrub or tree of the genus Acacia and the subgenus Plurinerves that is endemic to an area of north eastern Australia.

== Description ==
The shrub or tree can grow to a height of 6 m (20 ft) and has a single stem and glabrous, resinous, dark brown coloured branchlets. Like most species of Acacia it has phyllodes rather than true leaves. The straight and dimidiate, evergreen and glabrous phyllodes are slightly sickle shaped with a length of 7 to 12 cm (2.8 to 4.7 in) and a width of 15 to 35 mm (0.59 to 1.38 in) with three to four main longitudinal nerves.

== Taxonomy ==
The species was first formally described by the botanist Leslie Pedley in 2006 as a part of the work Notes on Acacia Mill. (Leguminosae: Mimosoideae), chiefly from Queensland as published in the journal Austrobaileya.

== Distribution ==
It is native to an area of Far North Queensland where it is commonly situated in granitic sandy beds of seasonally dry creeks or other watercourses which tend to regularly be inundated by floodwaters.

== See also ==
- List of Acacia species
