= Hibbertia hendersonii =

Scientific classification
- Kingdom: Plantae
- Clade: Tracheophytes
- Clade: Angiosperms
- Clade: Eudicots
- Order: Dilleniales
- Family: Dilleniaceae
- Genus: Hibbertia
- Species: H. hendersonii

Binomial name
- Hibbertia hendersonii S.T.Reynolds

Species of flowering plant

Hibbertia hendersonii is a species of flowering plant in the family Dilleniaceae and is endemic to the Blackdown Tableland in Queensland. It is an erect shrub with densely hairy foliage, narrow elliptic leaves, and yellow flowers, each usually with twenty to thirty-one stamens arranged on one side of the two carpels.

== Description ==
Hibbertia hendersonii is a shrub that typically grows to a height of up to 1.0 m (3 ft 3 in), its branches and leaves densely covered with fine, long hairs. The leaves are narrow elliptic, 28–45 mm (1.1–1.8 in) long and 1–3 mm (0.039–0.118 in) wide on a petiole up to 1.0 mm (0.039 in) long. The flowers are borne singly in leaf axils or on the ends of branchlets and are sessile and 2.5–2.8 mm (0.098–0.110 in) in diameter. There are as many as twenty-one flowers on each branchlet. Each flower has narrow egg-shaped bracts 3–7 mm (0.12–0.28 in) long. The two outer sepal lobes are 10–14 mm (0.39–0.55 in) long and densely hairy, the three inner ones broader, slightly longer and glabrous. The five petals are egg-shaped with the narrower end towards the base, yellow, 12–14 mm (0.47–0.55 in) long and there are usually twenty to thirty-one stamens free from each other and arranged on one side of the two carpels, each carpel with ten to twelve ovules.

== Taxonomy ==
Hibbertia hendersonii was first formally described in 1991 by Sally T. Reynolds in the journal Austrobaileya from specimens collected on the Blackdown Tableland in 1971. The specific epithet (hendersonii) honours Rodney John Francis Henderson, one of the collectors of the type specimens.

== Distribution and habitat ==
This hibbertia grows in forest at altitudes from 600 to 900 m (2,000 to 3,000 ft) and is common on the Blackdown Tableland in central Queensland.

== Conservation status ==
Hibbertia hendersonii is classified as of "least concern" under the Queensland Government Nature Conservation Act 1992.

== See also ==
- List of Hibbertia species
