= Leioproctus prasinus =

Scientific classification
- Kingdom: Animalia
- Phylum: Arthropoda
- Clade: Pancrustacea
- Class: Insecta
- Order: Hymenoptera
- Family: Colletidae
- Genus: Leioproctus
- Species: L. prasinus

Binomial name
- Leioproctus prasinus Batley, 2025

Species of bee

Leioproctus prasinus, or Leioproctus (Euryglossidia) prasinus, is a species of bee in the family Colletidae and subfamily Colletinae. It is endemic to Australia. It was described by entomologist Michael Batley in 2025.

== Etymology ==
The specific epithet prasinus (Latin: "leek-green") refers to colouration.

== Description ==
The female body length is 7.3 mm. Integumental colouration is mainly iridescent dark green. The hair is white to golden-brown.

== Distribution and habitat ==
The species occurs in western New South Wales. The type locality is 17 km south of Mount Hope.

== Behaviour ==
The adults are flying mellivores. Flowering plants visited by the bees include Acacia johnsonii.
