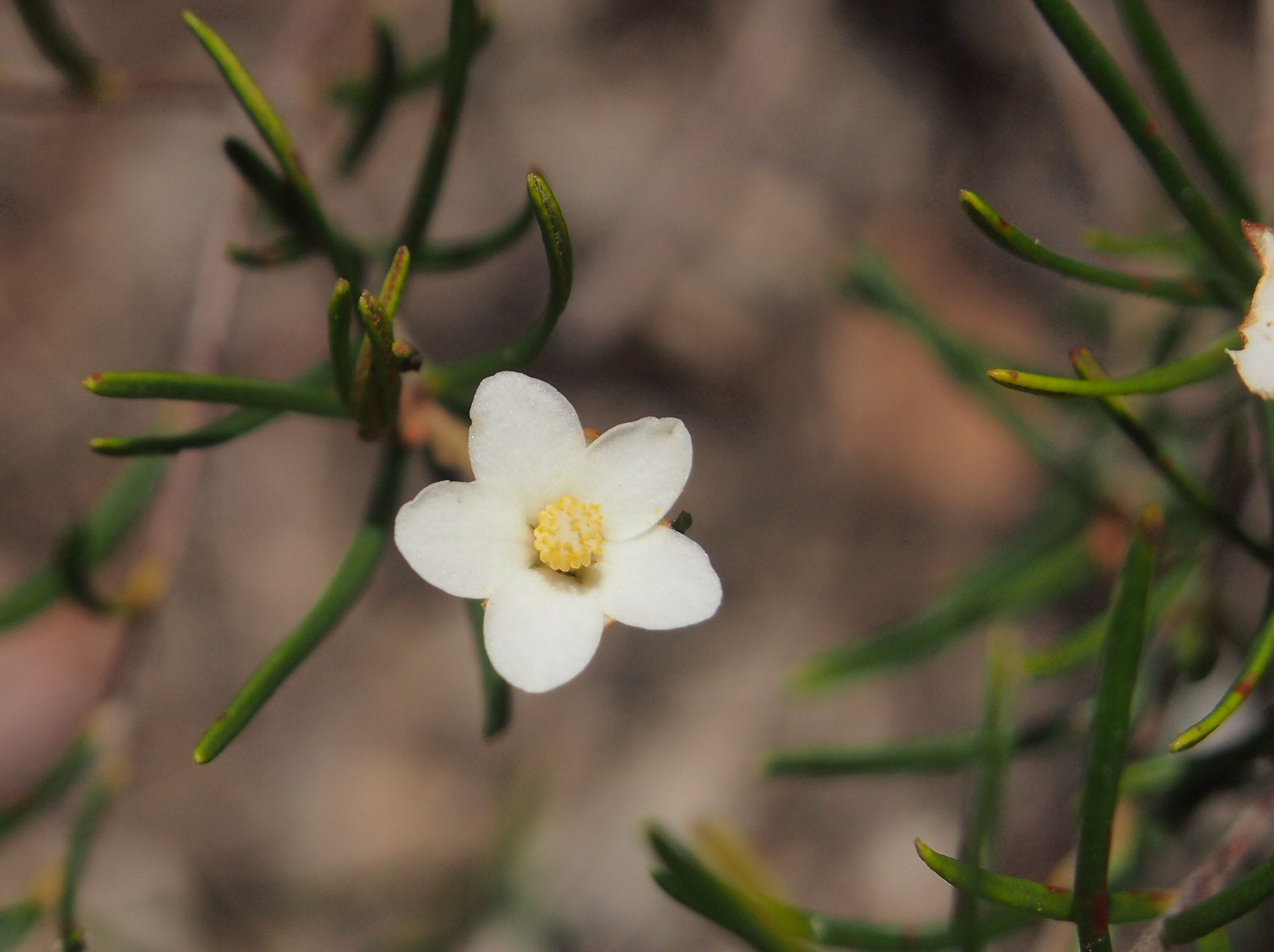
- Male flower of Ricinocarpos linearifolius

Scientific classification
- Kingdom: Plantae
- Clade: Tracheophytes
- Clade: Angiosperms
- Clade: Eudicots
- Clade: Rosids
- Order: Malpighiales
- Family: Euphorbiaceae
- Subfamily: Crotonoideae
- Tribe: Ricinocarpeae
- Subtribe: Ricinocarpinae
- Genus: Ricinocarpos; Desf.

Type species
- Ricinocarpos pinifolius Desf.

Synonyms
- Ricinocarpos sect. Euricinocarpus Müll.Arg. nom. inval.; Ricinocarpus F.Muell. orth. var.; Ricinocarpus sect. Euricinocarpus Müll.Arg orth. var.; Roeperia Spreng.

= Ricinocarpos =

Genus of flowering plants

Ricinocarpos is a genus of evergreen flowering plants in the family Euphorbiaceae and is endemic to Australia. Plants in the genus Ricinocarpos are monoecious shrubs with leaves arranged alternately along the branches, the edges curved downwards or rolled under. Male flowers are arranged singly or in racemes at the ends of branchlets, with four to six sepals that are fused at the base. There are four to six petals that are longer than the sepals, with many stamens fused to form a central column. Female flowers are arranged singly and are similar to male flowers but with three styles fused at the base and with a deeply branched tip. The fruit is a capsule containing seeds with an elaiosome.

The genus Ricinocarpus was first formally described in 1817 by René Louiche Desfontaines in Mémoires du Muséum d'histoire naturelle. The entire genus is endemic to Australia.

As of August 2023, the Australian Plant Census accepted the following species:

- Ricinocarpos bowmanii F.Muell. - western wedding bush, Bowman jasmine (N.S.W.)
- Ricinocarpos brevis R.J.F.Hend. & Mollemans (W.A.)
- Ricinocarpos caniana Halford & R.J.F.Hend. (Qld.)
- Ricinocarpos crispatus Halford & R.J.F.Hend. (Qld.)
- Ricinocarpos cyanescens Muell.Arg. (W.A.)
- Ricinocarpos glaucus Endl. (W.A.)
- Ricinocarpos gloria-medii J.H.Willis (N.T.)
- Ricinocarpos graniticus Halford & R.J.F.Hend. (W.A.)
- Ricinocarpos ledifolius F.Muell. (Qld.)
- Ricinocarpos linearifolius Halford & R.J.F.Hend (N.S.W., Qld.)
- Ricinocarpos marginatus Benth. (W.A.)
- Ricinocarpos megalocarpus Halford & R.J.F.Hend. (W.A.)
- Ricinocarpos muricatus Muell.Arg. (W.A.)
- Ricinocarpos oliganthus Halford & R.J.F.Hend. (W.A.)
- Ricinocarpos pilifer Halford & R.J.F.Hend. (W.A.)
- Ricinocarpos pinifolius Desf. (N.S.W., Qld., Vic., Tas., N.T.)
- Ricinocarpos psilocladus (Muell.Arg.) Benth. (W.A.)
- Ricinocarpos rosmarinifolius (A.Cunn.) Benth. (W.A.)
- Ricinocarpos ruminatus Halford & R.J.F.Hend. (Qld.)
- Ricinocarpos speciosus Muell.Arg. (Qld., N.S.W.)
- Ricinocarpos stylosus Diels (W.A.)
- Ricinocarpos trachyphyllus Halford & R.J.F.Hend. (Qld., N.S.W.)
- Ricinocarpos trichophorus Muell.Arg. (W.A.)
- Ricinocarpos trichophyllus Halford & R.J.F.Hend. (W.A., N.T.)
- Ricinocarpos tuberculatus Muell.Arg. (W.A.)
- Ricinocarpos undulatus Lehm. (W.A.)
- Ricinocarpos velutinus F.Muell. (W.A.)
- Ricinocarpos verrucosus Halford & R.J.F.Hend. (Qld.)
