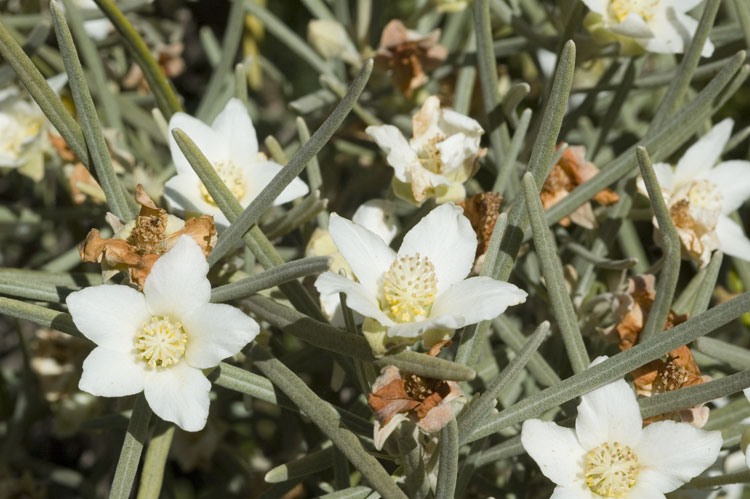
- In the Australian National Botanic Gardens

Scientific classification
- Kingdom: Plantae
- Clade: Tracheophytes
- Clade: Angiosperms
- Clade: Eudicots
- Clade: Rosids
- Order: Malpighiales
- Family: Euphorbiaceae
- Genus: Ricinocarpos
- Species: R. gloria-medii

Binomial name
- Ricinocarpos gloria-medii J.H.Willis

= Ricinocarpos gloria-medii =

Species of shrub

Ricinocarpos gloria-medii is a species of flowering plant in the family Euphorbiaceae and is endemic to the Northern Territory of Australia. It is a spreading, monoecious or dioecious shrub with linear leaves and male and female flowers arranged singly or in small groups.

== Description ==
Ricinocarpos gloria-medii is a spreading monoecious or dioecious shrub that typically grows to height of up to 2 m (6 ft 7 in) with rusty-hairy young branchlets. The leaves are linear, 25–60 mm (0.98–2.36 in) long and 1.3–3.5 mm (0.051–0.138 in) wide on a densely hairy petiole 2–3 mm (0.079–0.118 in) long. The upper surface of the leaves is more or less glabrous and the lower surface is covered with soft, white, woolly hairs. The flowers are arranged singly, or with two to four male flowers, or one female surrounded by up to four male flowers. Male flowers are on a slender, densely hairy pedicel 7–17 mm (0.28–0.67 in) long, the sepals covered with woolly, white, star-shaped hairs on the inside surface. The sepal lobes of male flowers are egg-shaped, 4.5–7 mm (0.18–0.28 in) long and the petals egg-shaped, white or cream-coloured, 7–11 mm (0.28–0.43 in) long and 3–5 mm (0.12–0.20 in) wide. Female flowers are on a stout pedicel 10–15 mm (0.39–0.59 in) long, the sepals densely hairy on the inside surface, the petals white or cream-coloured, 6.5–8 mm (0.26–0.31 in) long and 3–4 mm (0.12–0.16 in) wide. Flowering has been observed in June and July, and the fruit is a more or less spherical capsule 10–11 mm (0.39–0.43 in) long and wide.

== Taxonomy and naming ==
Ricinocarpos gloria-medii was first formally described in 1975 by James Hamlyn Willis in the journal Muelleria, from specimens collected at Simpsons Gap in 1972. The specific epithet (gloria-medii), means "glory of the centre".

== Distribution and habitat ==
This species grows in sheltered places in dry watercourses and at the base of cliffs in the MacDonnell Ranges in the Northern Territory.
