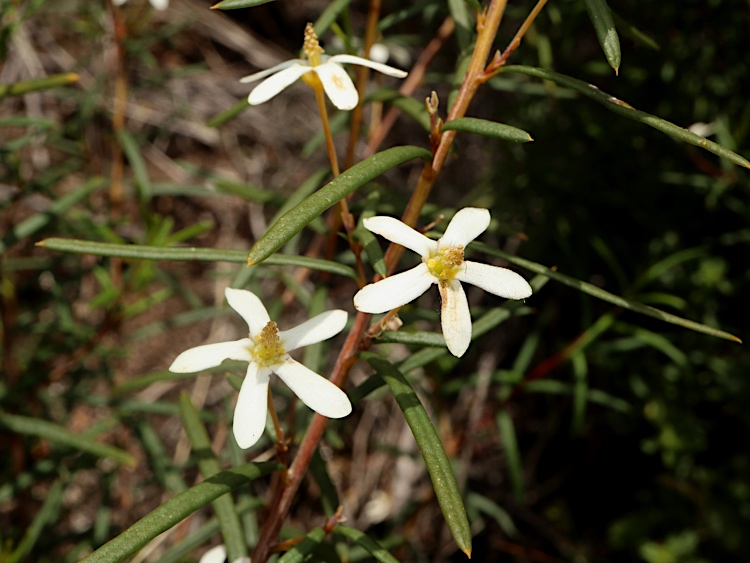
- In Mount Frankland National Park

Scientific classification
- Kingdom: Plantae
- Clade: Tracheophytes
- Clade: Angiosperms
- Clade: Eudicots
- Clade: Rosids
- Order: Malpighiales
- Family: Euphorbiaceae
- Genus: Ricinocarpos
- Species: R. glaucus

Binomial name
- Ricinocarpos glaucus Muell.Arg.

= Ricinocarpos glaucus =

Species of shrub

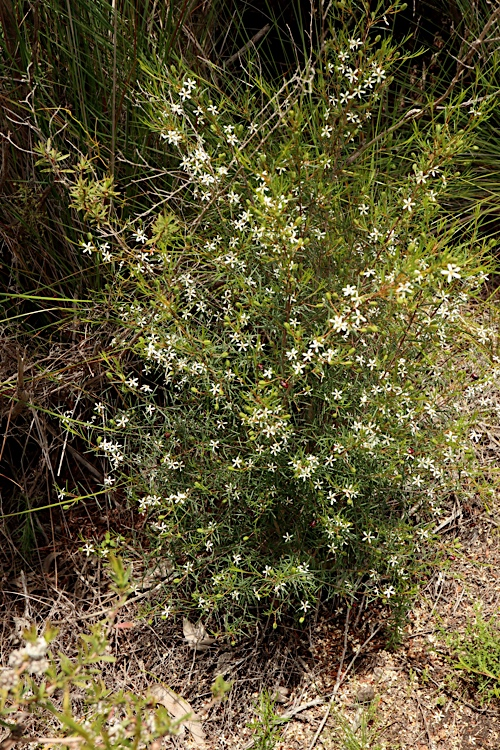
Habit

Ricinocarpos glaucus is a species of flowering plant in the family Euphorbiaceae and is endemic to the south-west of Western Australia. It is an erect, monoecious or dioecious shrub with linear or narrowly oblong leaves and male and female flowers arranged singly or in small groups.

== Description ==
Ricinocarpos glaucus is an erect, monoecious or dioecious shrub that typically grows to height of up to 2 m (6 ft 7 in) with hairy young branchlets. The leaves are linear to narrowly oblong, 10–40 mm (0.39–1.57 in) long and 0.8–2 mm (0.031–0.079 in) wide on a densely hairy petiole 1–2 mm (0.039–0.079 in) long. The upper surface of the leaves is glabrous and the lower surface is covered with soft, white, woolly hairs. The flowers are arranged singly, or with two to four male flowers, or one female surrounded by up to three male flowers. Male flowers are on a slender, more or less glabrous pedicel 7–25 mm (0.28–0.98 in) long, the sepals covered with woolly, white, star-shaped hairs on the inside surface. The sepal lobes of male flowers are usually triangular, 1.5–3 mm (0.059–0.118 in) long and the petals narrowly oblong, white and 5–12 mm (0.20–0.47 in) long and 1.5–2.7 mm (0.059–0.106 in) wide. Female flowers are on a stout pedicel 7–20 mm (0.28–0.79 in) long, the sepals densely hairy on the inside surface, the petals white, 7–10 mm (0.28–0.39 in) long and 1.6–2 mm (0.063–0.079 in) wide. Flowering occurs from June to September, and the fruit is a glabrous, oblong capsule 6.5–8 mm (0.26–0.31 in) long and has three lobes.

== Taxonomy and naming ==
Ricinocarpos glaucus was first formally described in 1837 by Stephan Endlicher in Enumeratio plantarum quas in Novae Hollandiae ora austro-occidentali ad fluvium Cygnorum et in sinu Regis Georgii collegit Carolus Liber Baro de Hügel, from specimens collected near King George Sound. The specific epithet (glaucus) means "glaucous".

== Distribution and habitat ==
This species grows in a variety of habitats, including tall forest, sandstone hills and low heath on rocky granite rises. It is found from near Margaret River to Cape Riche in the Avon Wheatbelt, Esperance Plains, Jarrah Forest, Swan Coastal Plain and Warren bioregions of south-western Western Australia.

== Conservation status ==
Ricinocarpos glaucus is listed as "not threatened" by the Western Australian Government Department of Biodiversity, Conservation and Attractions.
