= Corymbia hendersonii =

Henderson's bloodwood

Scientific classification
- Kingdom: Plantae
- Clade: Tracheophytes
- Clade: Angiosperms
- Clade: Eudicots
- Clade: Rosids
- Order: Myrtales
- Family: Myrtaceae
- Genus: Corymbia
- Species: C. hendersonii

Binomial name
- Corymbia hendersonii K.D.Hill & L.A.S.Johnson

Synonyms
- Eucalyptus hendersonii (K.D.Hill & L.A.S.Johnson) Brooker

Species of plant

Corymbia hendersonii, commonly known as Henderson's bloodwood, is a species of tree that is endemic to Queensland. It has rough, tessellated bark on the trunk and branches, lance-shaped adult leaves, flower buds in groups of seven, creamy white flowers and urn-shaped to barrel-shaped fruit.

== Description ==
Corymbia hendersonii is a tree that typically grows to a height of 25 m (82 ft) and forms a lignotuber. It has rough, tessellated bark on the trunk and branches. Young plants and coppice regrowth have linear to narrow lance-shaped leaves that are 42–95 mm (1.7–3.7 in) long, 7–20 mm (0.28–0.79 in) wide and paler on the lower surface. Adult leaves are arranged alternately, glossy dark green on the upper surface, much paler below, lance-shaped, 70–170 mm (2.8–6.7 in) long and 8–30 mm (0.31–1.18 in) wide, tapering to a petiole 9–26 mm (0.35–1.02 in) long. The flower buds are arranged on the ends of branchlets on a branched peduncle 2–20 mm (0.079–0.787 in) long, each branch of the peduncle with seven buds on pedicels 3–19 mm (0.12–0.75 in) long. Mature buds are oval, 8–12 mm (0.31–0.47 in) long and 4–6 mm (0.16–0.24 in) wide with a rounded or conical operculum. Flowering occurs from January to March and the flowers are creamy white. The fruit is a woody urn-shaped to barrel-shaped capsule 17–31 mm (0.67–1.22 in) long and 14–22 mm (0.55–0.87 in) wide with the valves enclosed in the fruit.

== Taxonomy and naming ==
Corymbia hendersonii was first formally described in 1995 by Ken Hill and Lawrie Johnson from specimens collected by R.J. Henderson and others on the Blackdown Tableland in 1971. The specific epithet (hendersonii) honours the collector of the type specimens.

== Distribution and habitat ==
This eucalypt grows with others, usually on rocky slopes and ridges on the Blackdown Tableland, the Carnarvon Range west of Rockhampton and south the Cracow.

== Conservation status ==
Henderson's bloodwood is listed as of "least concern" under the Queensland Government Nature Conservation Act 1992.
