= Ricinocarpos trichophorus =

Conservation status
- Declared rare (DEC)

Scientific classification
- Kingdom: Plantae
- Clade: Tracheophytes
- Clade: Angiosperms
- Clade: Eudicots
- Clade: Rosids
- Order: Malpighiales
- Family: Euphorbiaceae
- Genus: Ricinocarpos
- Species: R. trichophorus

Binomial name
- Ricinocarpos trichophorus Müll.Arg.

Synonyms
- Ricinocarpus trichophorus Müll.Arg. orth. var.; Ricinocarpus trichoporus F.Muell. orth. var.; Roeperia trichophora (Müll.Arg.) Kuntze

Species of shrub

Ricinocarpos trichophorus is a species of flowering plant in the family Euphorbiaceae and is endemic to the south coast of Western Australia. It is an erect, openly branched, monoecious shrub with linear to narrowly oblong leaves, and white flowers in a raceme with two female flowers and up to five male flowers.

== Description ==
Ricinocarpos trichophorus is an erect, openly branched, monoecious shrub that typically grows to a height of up to 1.8 m (5 ft 11 in), its young branchlets densely covered with greyish-white, star-shaped hairs. The leaves are linear to narrowly oblong, 25–60 mm (0.98–2.36 in) long, 1.5–4.5 mm (0.059–0.177 in) wide with the edges curved under, and sessile or on a short petiole. The upper surface of the leaves is soon glabrous and the lower surface is not visible, apart from the midrib. The flowers are arranged on the ends of branchlets in a raceme with two female flowers at the base and up to five male flowers above them. Each flower has 5 sepals joined at the base and 5 white petals twice as long as the sepals. Male flowers are on a slender pedicel 5–10 mm (0.20–0.39 in) long, the sepal lobes 4.0–5.5 mm (0.16–0.22 in) long and 1.5–2.5 mm (0.059–0.098 in) wide. The petals of male flowers are 8–10 mm (0.31–0.39 in) long and 3.5–5.0 mm (0.14–0.20 in) wide and there are 50 to 60 stamens in a central column. Female flowers are on a stout pedicel 4–10 mm (0.16–0.39 in) long, the sepal lobes 4–7 mm (0.16–0.28 in) long and 1.5–2.5 mm (0.059–0.098 in) wide, the petals 8–9 mm (0.31–0.35 in) long and 1.5–2.5 mm (0.059–0.098 in) wide. Flowering has been observed in January, March and May and from August to November, and the fruit is an elliptic capsule, 8–10 mm (0.31–0.39 in) long and 7–10 mm (0.28–0.39 in) wide.

== Taxonomy and naming ==
Ricinocarpos trichophorus was first formally described in 1864 by Johannes Müller Argoviensis in the journal Linnaea, from specimens collected near the Swan River by James Drummond. The specific epithet (trichophorus) means "bearing hairs".

== Distribution and habitat ==
This species grows in shrubland between sandstone and granite boulders from near the Fitzgerald River and south-west of Ravensthorpe, and north east of Esperance, in the Esperance Plains and Mallee bioregions of southern Western Australia.

== Conservation status ==
Ricinocarpos trichophorus is listed as "Threatened" by the Western Australian Government Department of Biodiversity, Conservation and Attractions, meaning that it is in danger of extinction.
