= Ricinocarpos stylosus =

Scientific classification
- Kingdom: Plantae
- Clade: Tracheophytes
- Clade: Angiosperms
- Clade: Eudicots
- Clade: Rosids
- Order: Malpighiales
- Family: Euphorbiaceae
- Genus: Ricinocarpos
- Species: R. stylosus

Binomial name
- Ricinocarpos stylosus Benth.

Synonyms
- Bertya andrewsii W.Fitzg.; Ricinocarpus stylosus Diels orth. var.

Species of shrub

Ricinocarpos stylosus is a species of flowering plant in the family Euphorbiaceae and is endemic to the Norseman district of Western Australia. It is a spreading, rounded, monoecious or dioeceous shrub or small tree, with linear to narrowly oblong leaves and female flowers arranged singly, or with two to five male flowers, or a single female flower surrounded by up to four male flowers.

== Description ==
Ricinocarpos stylosus is a spreading, rounded, monoecious or dioecious shrub that typically grows to height of up to 2 m (6 ft 7 in), sometimes a small tree up to 5 m (16 ft) high, its young branchlets sticky. The leaves are linear to narrowly oblong, 6–10 mm (0.24–0.39 in) long and 1.0–1.5 mm (0.039–0.059 in) wide on a petiole 1–2 mm (0.039–0.079 in) long. The upper surface of the leaves is more or less glabrous and the lower surface is covered with soft, white, star-shaped hairs. The flowers are arranged on the ends of branchlets with a single female, or with two to five male flowers, or a single female flower surrounded by up to four male flowers. Each flower has 5 sepals joined at the base but there are no petals. Male flowers are on a slender pedicel 3–5 mm (0.12–0.20 in) long, the sepal lobes 3–4 mm (0.12–0.16 in) long and 1.5–3.0 mm (0.059–0.118 in) wide. There are about 35 stamens in a central column 2–3 mm (0.079–0.118 in) long. Female flowers are on a stout pedicel 3–6 mm (0.12–0.24 in) long, the sepal lobes 3–4 mm (0.12–0.16 in) long and 1.5–3 mm (0.059–0.118 in) wide. Flowering occurs between August and January, and the fruit is more or less spherical capsule 7.0–10 mm (0.28–0.39 in) in diameter.

== Taxonomy and naming ==
Ricinocarpos stylosus was first formally described in 1904 by Ludwig Diels in Botanische Jahrbücher für Systematik, Pflanzengeschichte und Pflanzengeographie from specimens collected near Coolgardie. The specific epithet (stylosus) means "indicating marked development of the style".

== Distribution and habitat ==
This species grows in woodland or open forest in the Norseman district in the Coolgardie and Mallee bioregions in the south-west of Western Australia.
