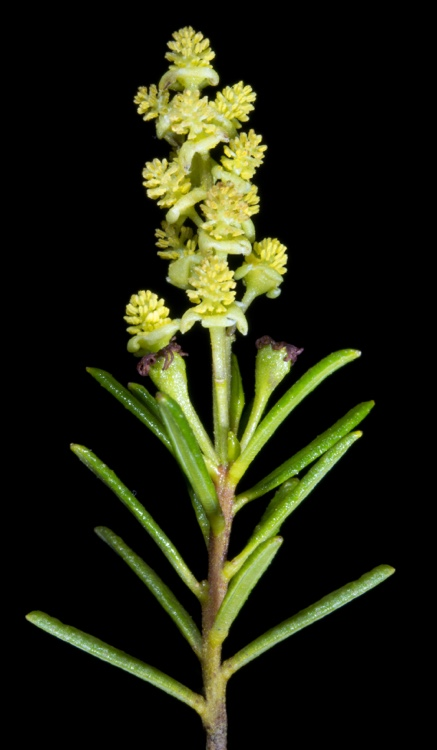
- Near Yuna

Scientific classification
- Kingdom: Plantae
- Clade: Tracheophytes
- Clade: Angiosperms
- Clade: Eudicots
- Clade: Rosids
- Order: Malpighiales
- Family: Euphorbiaceae
- Genus: Ricinocarpos
- Species: R. muricatus

Binomial name
- Ricinocarpos muricatus Müll.Arg.

Synonyms
- Bertya quadrisepala F.Muell.; Ricinocarpus muricatus Müll.Arg. orth. var.; Roeperia muricata (Müll.Arg.) Kuntze

= Ricinocarpos muricatus =

Species of shrub

Ricinocarpos muricatus is a species of flowering plant in the family Euphorbiaceae and is endemic to the south-west of Western Australia. It is an erect to spreading, sticky, monoecious shrub with linear leaves and yellow flowers arranged in a raceme, with one or two female flowers surrounded by 8 to 12 male flowers.

== Description ==
Ricinocarpos muricatus is an erect to spreading, sticky, monoecious shrub that typically grows to height of up to 2.5 m (8 ft 2 in), its young branchlets soon glabrous. The leaves are linear, mostly 20–45 mm (0.79–1.77 in) long and 1–2 mm (0.039–0.079 in) wide on a glabrous petiole up to 1 mm (0.039 in) long. The upper surface of the leaves is glabrous and the lower surface is covered with soft, star-shaped hairs. The flowers are yellow and arranged in racemes with one or two female flowers on the ends of branches, with 8 to 12 male flowers below them. Male flowers are on a slender pedicel 1–3 mm (0.039–0.118 in) long, the sepals joined at the base, the sepal lobes 2.3–3.0 mm (0.091–0.118 in) long with 5 fleshy glands. There are 20 to 30 stamens in a central column 2–3 mm (0.079–0.118 in) long. Female flowers are on a pedicel 6–12 mm (0.24–0.47 in) long, the sepal lobes 2.0–4.4 mm (0.079–0.173 in) long and 0.9–5 mm (0.035–0.197 in) wide. Flowering has been observed from April to November, and the fruit is a more or less spherical or oval capsule 5–7 mm (0.20–0.28 in) long and wide.

== Taxonomy and naming ==
Ricinocarpos muricatus was first formally described in 1865 by Johannes Müller Argoviensis in the journal Linnaea. The specific epithet (muricatus) means "rough, with short, hard points", referring to the fruit.

== Distribution and habitat ==
This species grows in shrubland, heath and mallee from near the Murchison River to near Esperance in the Avon Wheatbelt, Carnarvon, Coolgardie, Geraldton Sandplains, Mallee, Murchison and Yalgoo bioregions of south-western Western Australia.
