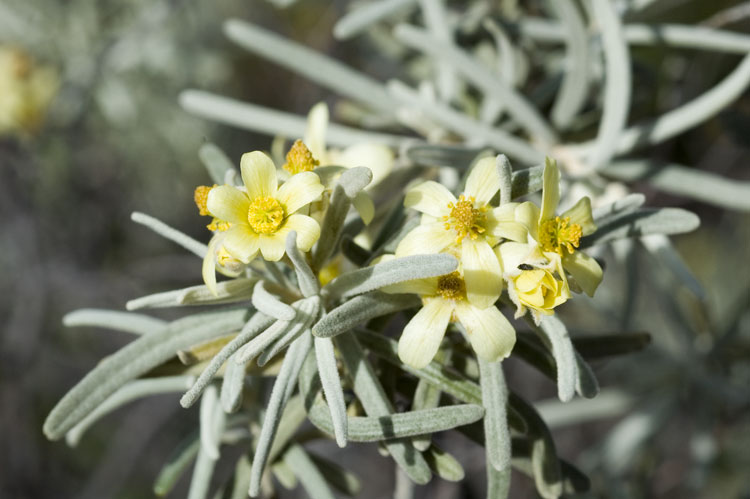
- Near Bulfinch

Scientific classification
- Kingdom: Plantae
- Clade: Tracheophytes
- Clade: Angiosperms
- Clade: Eudicots
- Clade: Rosids
- Order: Malpighiales
- Family: Euphorbiaceae
- Genus: Ricinocarpos
- Species: R. velutinus

Binomial name
- Ricinocarpos velutinus F.Muell.

Synonyms
- Plagianthera monoicus A.D.Chapm. nom. inval., nom. nud.; Plagianthus monoica Ewart; Plagianthus monoicus Helms ex Ewart; Ricinocarpus velutinus F.Muell.; Roeperia velutina (F.Muell.) Kuntze

= Ricinocarpos velutinus =

Species of shrub

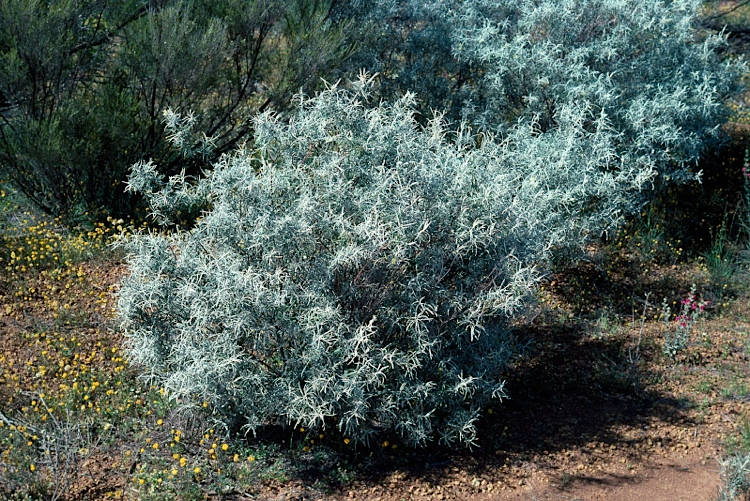
Habit near Mullewa

Ricinocarpos velutinus is a species of flowering plant in the family Euphorbiaceae and is endemic to the south-west of Western Australia. It is an erect, rounded, usually monoecious shrub with linear leaves, and yellow flowers with either all female or all male flowers, or one or two female flowers with up to 13 male flowers below them.

== Description ==
Ricinocarpos velutinus is an erect, rounded, usually monoecious shrub that typically grows to a height of up to 2.0 m (6 ft 7 in), its young branchlets densely covered with white, star-shaped hairs. The leaves are linear, 25–55 mm (0.98–2.17 in) long and 1.5–4 mm (0.059–0.157 in) wide and sessile or on a short petiole. Both surfaces of the leaves are covered with soft, white, star-shaped hairs, and the edges of the leaves are curved downwards. The flowers are usually arranged on the ends of branchlets in a raceme with either all female or all male flowers, or one or two female flowers with up to 13 male flowers below them. Each flower has 5 sepals joined at the base and usually 5 yellow petals, slightly longer than the sepals. Male flowers are on a slender pedicel 4–11 mm (0.16–0.43 in) long, the sepal lobes 4–7 mm (0.16–0.28 in) long and 2–3 mm (0.079–0.118 in) wide. The petals of male flowers are 6.5–8.5 mm (0.26–0.33 in) long and 3–4 mm (0.12–0.16 in) wide and there are 40 to 70 stamens in a central column. Female flowers are on a stout pedicel 5–15 mm (0.20–0.59 in) long, the sepal lobes 8–10 mm (0.31–0.39 in) long and 4–5 mm (0.16–0.20 in) wide, the petals about 7 mm (0.28 in) long and 2 mm (0.079 in) wide. Flowering mainly occurs from August to October and the fruit is an elliptic capsule, 9–10 mm (0.35–0.39 in) long and 9–12 mm (0.35–0.47 in) wide.

== Taxonomy and naming ==
Ricinocarpos velutinus was first formally described in 1875 by Ferdinand von Mueller in his Fragmenta Phytographiae Australiae. The specific epithet (velutinus) means "velvety".

== Distribution and habitat ==
This species grows in shrubland or open woodland between Mullewa, Merredin and Coolgardie in the Avon Wheatbelt, Coolgardie, Geraldton Sandplains and Yalgoo bioregions of south-western Western Australia.

== Conservation status ==
Ricinocarpos velutinus is listed as "not threatened" by the Western Australian Government Department of Biodiversity, Conservation and Attractions.
