= Ricinocarpos marginatus =

Conservation status
- Priority Two — Poorly Known Taxa (DEC)

Scientific classification
- Kingdom: Plantae
- Clade: Tracheophytes
- Clade: Angiosperms
- Clade: Eudicots
- Clade: Rosids
- Order: Malpighiales
- Family: Euphorbiaceae
- Genus: Ricinocarpos
- Species: R. marginatus

Binomial name
- Ricinocarpos marginatus Benth.

Species of shrub

Ricinocarpos marginatus is a species of flowering plant in the family Euphorbiaceae and is endemic to the north-west of Western Australia. It is an erect, monoecious shrub with narrowly elliptic leaves and white flowers arranged in groups of male flowers, or up to three female flowers surrounded by many male flowers.

== Description ==
Ricinocarpos marginatus is a monoecious shrub that typically grows to a height of 0.5–3 m (1 ft 8 in – 9 ft 10 in), its young branchlets covered with white, star-shaped hairs. The leaves are very narrowly elliptic, 45–90 mm (1.8–3.5 in) long and 8–20 mm (0.31–0.79 in) wide on a densely hairy petiole 1–6 mm (0.039–0.236 in) long. The lower surface of the leaves is covered with soft, white, star-shaped hairs. The flowers are arranged in groups of all male flowers, or up to three female flowers surrounded by many male flowers. Male flowers are on a slender pedicel 3–8 mm (0.12–0.31 in) long, the sepals joined at the base and covered on both sides with white, star-shaped hairs, the sepal lobes egg-shaped to more or less elliptic and about 2.5 mm (0.098 in) long. The petals are white and egg-shaped with the narrower end towards the base, about 2 mm (0.079 in) long and wide. Each male flower has about 25 stamens. Female flowers are on a stout pedicel 6–15 mm (0.24–0.59 in) long and have narrowly oblong, white petals covered on both sides with soft, star-shaped hairs. Flowering has been observed in June and December, and the fruit is an elliptic capsule 7–8 mm (0.28–0.31 in) long and 5–6 mm (0.20–0.24 in) wide.

== Taxonomy and naming ==
Ricinocarpos marginatus was first formally described in 1873 by George Bentham in Flora Australiensis from specimens collected by Allan Cunningham on the north-west coast of Western Australia. The specific epithet (marginatus) means "furnished with a border", referring to the thickened edges of the leaves.

== Distribution and habitat ==
This species grows in woodland amongst sandstone rocks in the Northern Kimberley bioregion of north-western Western Australia.

== Conservation status ==
Ricinocarpos marginatus is listed as is classified as "Priority Two" by the Government of Western Australia Department of Biodiversity, Conservation and Attractions, meaning that it is known from only few locations some of which are not thought to be under immediate threat.
