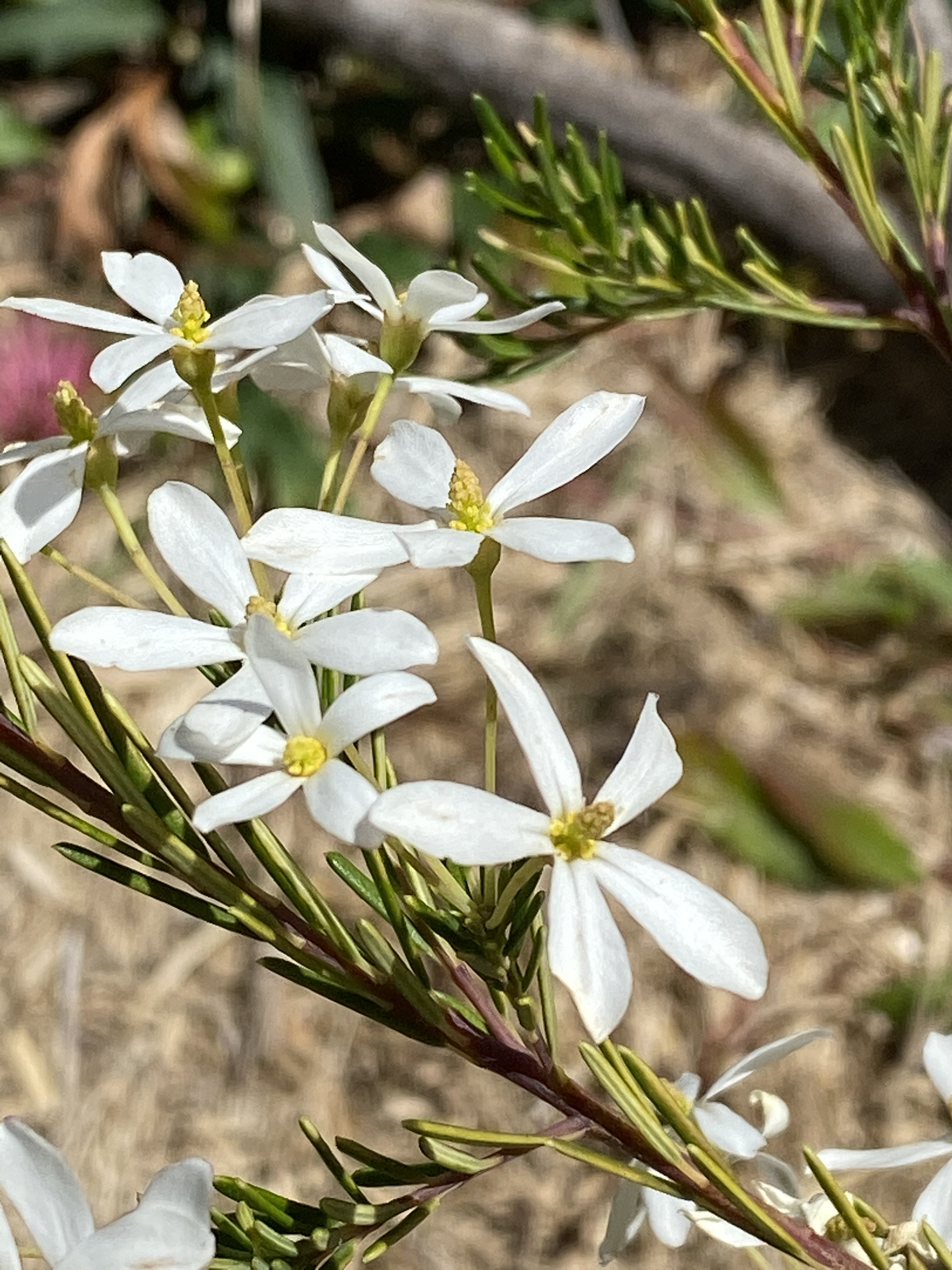
- Ricinocarpos pinifolius flowers
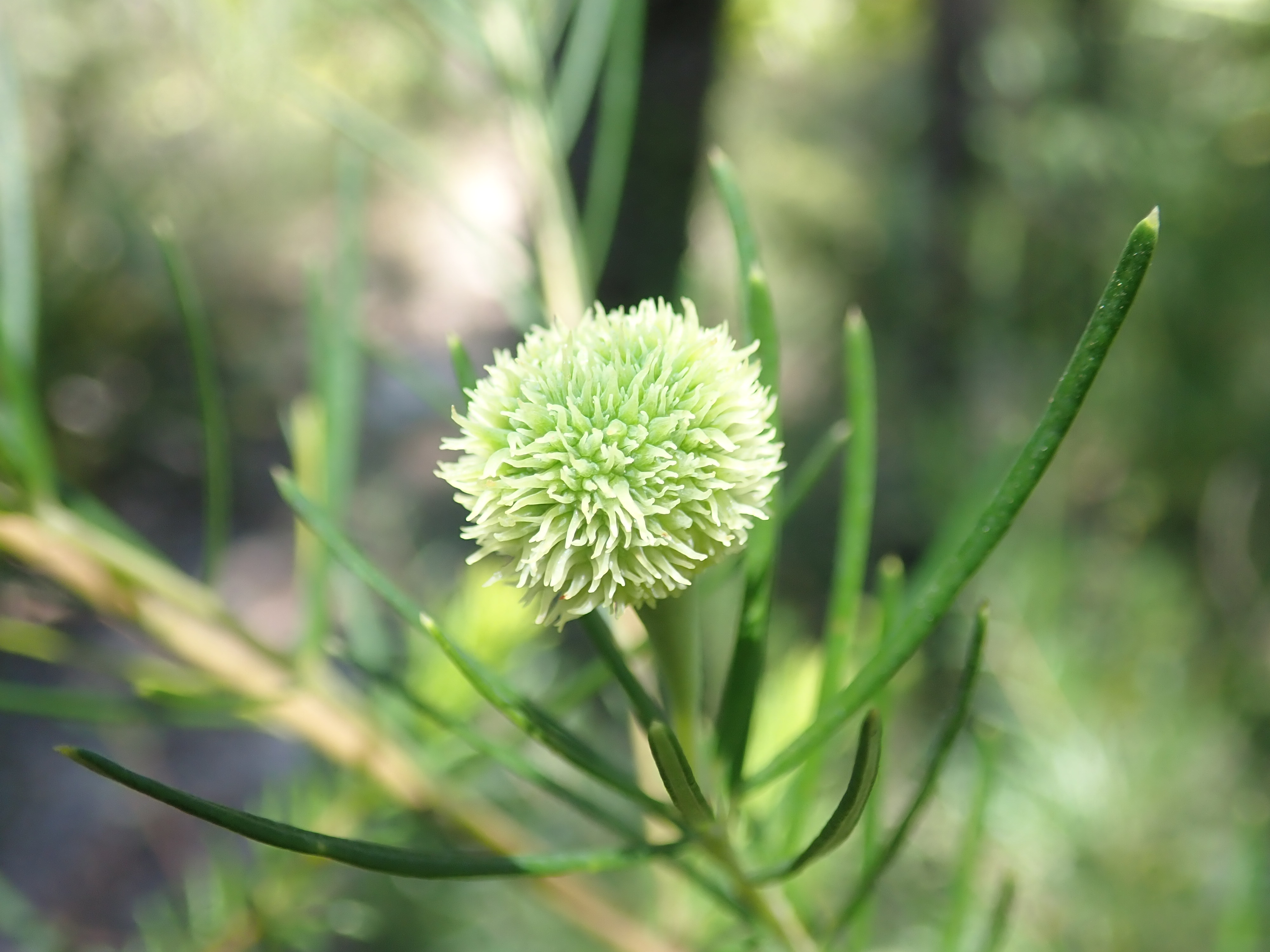
- Ricinocarpos pinifolius fruit

Scientific classification
- Kingdom: Plantae
- Clade: Tracheophytes
- Clade: Angiosperms
- Clade: Eudicots
- Clade: Rosids
- Order: Malpighiales
- Family: Euphorbiaceae
- Genus: Ricinocarpos
- Species: R. pinifolius

Binomial name
- Ricinocarpos pinifolius Desf.

= Ricinocarpos pinifolius =

Wedding bush

Species of shrub

Ricinocarpos pinifolius, commonly known as wedding bush, is a shrub of the family Euphorbiaceae and is endemic to eastern Australia. It has fragrant daisy-like flowers in spring.

== Description ==
Ricinocarpos pinifolius is a small shrub 1–3 m (3 ft 3 in – 9 ft 10 in) high and 1–2 m (3 ft 3 in – 6 ft 7 in) wide with smooth branches. The smooth leaves are narrow, 1–3 mm (0.039–0.118 in) wide, 1–4 cm (0.39–1.57 in) long and the leaf margin may be either rolled downwards or backwards on a petiole about 3 mm (0.12 in) long. The clusters of flowers are in leaf axils, usually 3-6 male and 1 female flower. The peduncle 10–20 mm (0.39–0.79 in) long, sepals 3–4 mm (0.12–0.16 in) long and the usually white petals 10–15 mm (0.39–0.59 in) long, egg-shaped and the stamens yellow. The calyx are 3–4 mm (0.12–0.16 in) long and almost as long as the petals. The seed capsule is roughly spherical shaped, about 12 mm (0.47 in) in diameter and thickly covered with spines.

== Taxonomy and naming ==
Ricinocarpos pinifolius was first formally described in 1817 by René Louiche Desfontaines and the description was published in Memoires du Museum d'Histoire Naturelle. The specific epithet (pinifolius) is from the Latin words pinus meaning "pine" and folium meaning "leaf".

== Distribution and habitat ==
The wedding bush is found in sandy soils in heath and open forests mostly in coastal locations in New South Wales, Queensland, Victoria, Tasmania and the Northern Territory.
