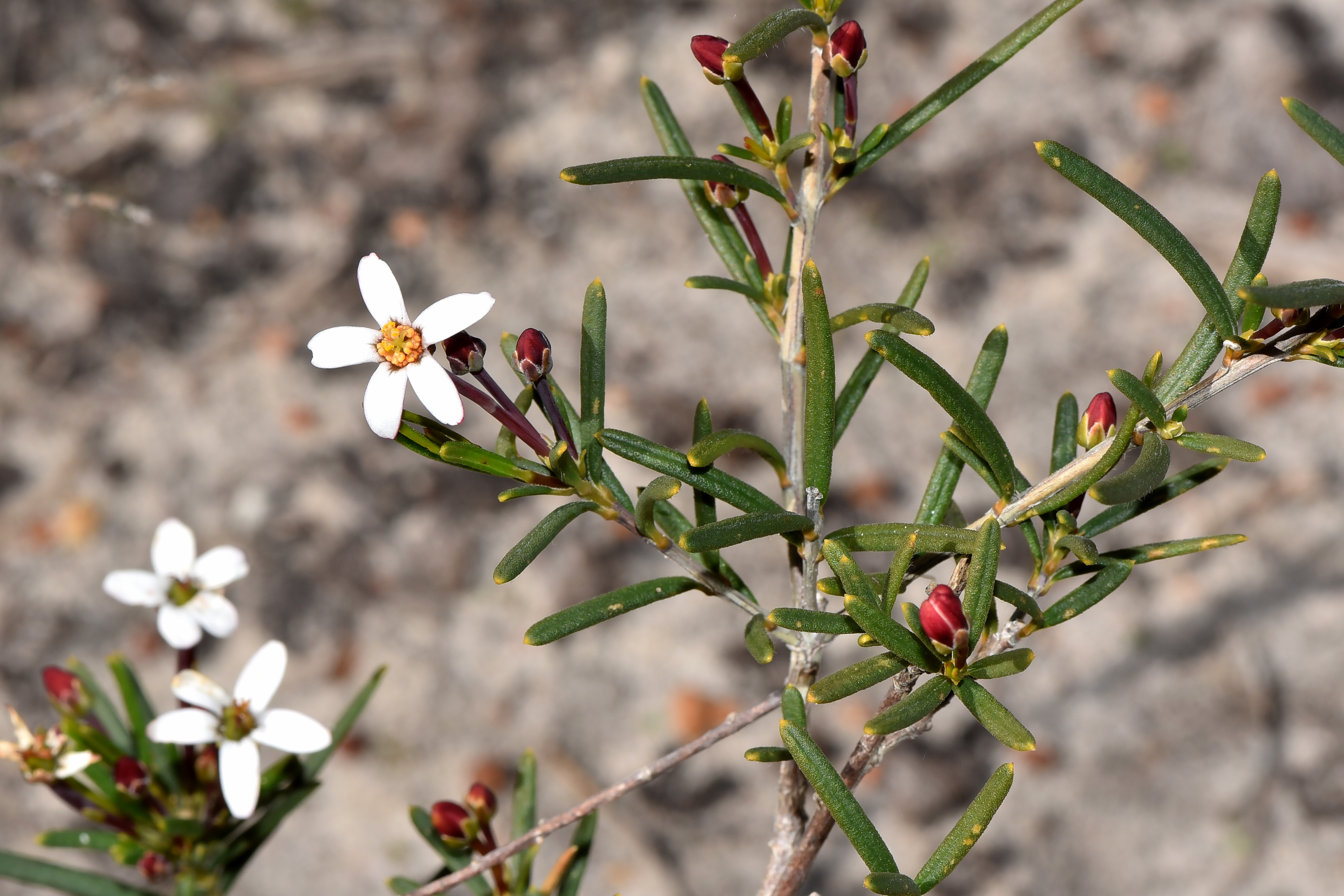

Scientific classification
- Kingdom: Plantae
- Clade: Tracheophytes
- Clade: Angiosperms
- Clade: Eudicots
- Clade: Rosids
- Order: Malpighiales
- Family: Euphorbiaceae
- Genus: Ricinocarpos
- Species: R. undulatus

Binomial name
- Ricinocarpos undulatus Lehm.

Synonyms
- Ricinocarpos glaucus var. undulatus (Lehm.) Baill. isonym; Ricinocarpos glaucus var. undulatus (Lehm.) Müll.Arg.; Ricinocarpus glaucus var. undulatus Müll.Arg. orth. var.; Ricinocarpus undulatus Lehm. orth. var.

= Ricinocarpos undulatus =

Species of shrub

Ricinocarpos undulatus, commonly known as wedding bush, is a species of flowering plant in the family Euphorbiaceae and is endemic to the south-west of Western Australia. It is an erect, monoecious or dioecious shrub with linear leaves, and white flowers in a umbel with either a single male or female flower, 2 to 5 male flowers, or a single female flower surrounded by up to 3 male flowers.

== Description ==
Ricinocarpos undulatus is an erect, monoecious or dioecious spindly shrub that typically grows to a height of up to 1.5 m (4 ft 11 in), its young branchlets hairy. The leaves are linear, 13–35 mm (0.51–1.38 in) long and 1.3–3 mm (0.051–0.118 in) wide with the edges curved under, on a petiole 0.5–2 mm (0.020–0.079 in) long. The upper surface of the leaves is glabrous and the lower surface is silky-hairy. The flowers are usually arranged on the ends of branchlets with either a single male or female flower, 2 to 5 male flowers, or a single female flower surrounded by up to 3 male flowers. Each flower has 5 sepals joined at the base and usually 5 white petals about 5 times as long as the sepals. Male flowers are on a slender pedicel 10–25 mm (0.39–0.98 in) long, the sepal lobes 2–3 mm (0.079–0.118 in) long and 1.3–1.6 mm (0.051–0.063 in) wide. The petals of male flowers are 7–15 mm (0.28–0.59 in) long and 2.2–4.5 mm (0.087–0.177 in) wide and there are 15 to 25 stamens in a central column. Female flowers are on a slender pedicel 15–25 mm (0.59–0.98 in) long, the sepal lobes 2.3–3.2 mm (0.091–0.126 in) long and 1.5–1.7 mm (0.059–0.067 in) wide, the petals 8–12 mm (0.31–0.47 in) long and 2.7–3.8 mm (0.11–0.15 in) wide. Flowering occurs in September and October and the fruit is an elliptic capsule, 8–10 mm (0.31–0.39 in) long and 6.0–7.5 mm (0.24–0.30 in) wide.

== Taxonomy and naming ==
Ricinocarpos undulatus was first formally described in 1848 by Johann Georg Christian Lehmann in his Plantae Preissianae. The specific epithet (undulatus) means "wavy".

== Distribution and habitat ==
This species grows in heath, shrubland, mallee and open woodland between Green Head, Wubin, Fremantle and Merredin in the Avon Wheatbelt, Geraldton Sandplains, Jarrah Forest, Mallee and Swan Coastal Plain bioregions of south-western Western Australia.

== Conservation status ==
Ricinocarpos undulatus is listed as "not threatened" by the Western Australian Government Department of Biodiversity, Conservation and Attractions.
