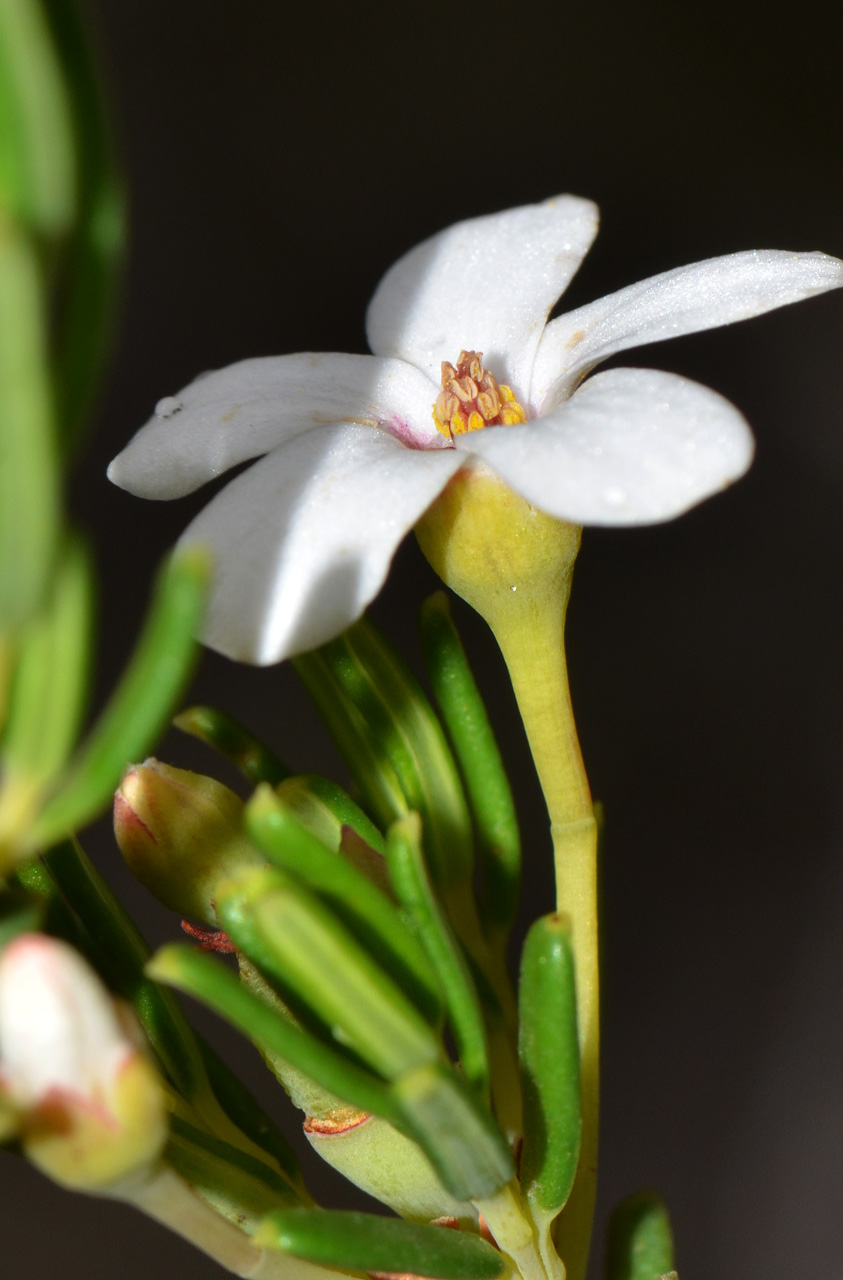

Scientific classification
- Kingdom: Plantae
- Clade: Tracheophytes
- Clade: Angiosperms
- Clade: Eudicots
- Clade: Rosids
- Order: Malpighiales
- Family: Euphorbiaceae
- Genus: Ricinocarpos
- Species: R. cyanescens

Binomial name
- Ricinocarpos cyanescens Muell.Arg.

= Ricinocarpos cyanescens =

Species of shrub

Ricinocarpos cyanescens is a species of flowering plant in the family Euphorbiaceae and is endemic to the south-west of Western Australia. It is a compact, monoecious shrub with narrowly oblong leaves and male and female flowers arranged singly or in small groups.

== Description ==
Ricinocarpos cyanescens is a monoecious shrub that typically grows to height of 1.2–3 m (3 ft 11 in – 9 ft 10 in) with glabrous and more or less glaucous young branchlets. The leaves are glabrous, narrowly oblong, 7–12 mm (0.28–0.47 in) long and 1.0–1.7 mm (0.039–0.067 in) wide on a petiole 1–2 mm (0.039–0.079 in) long. The flowers are arranged singly, or with two to four male flowers, or one female with up to two male flowers. The flowers are conspicuous and arranged on a pedicel densely covered with woolly white, star-shaped hairs. Male flowers are on a thin pedicel 5–16 mm (0.20–0.63 in) long, the sepals covered with woolly, white, star-shaped hairs. Male flowers have narrowly egg-shaped, white petals 6–11 mm (0.24–0.43 in) long and 2–3 mm (0.079–0.118 in) wide. Female flowers are usually on a stout pedicel 3–10 mm (0.12–0.39 in) long, the sepals densely hairy, the petals white, 6–7 mm (0.24–0.28 in) long and 2.0–2.5 mm (0.079–0.098 in) wide. Flowering has been observed in June, July and November, and the fruit is a glabrous capsule 10–11 mm (0.39–0.43 in) long and covered with star-shaped hairs.

== Taxonomy and naming ==
Ricinocarpos cyanescens was first formally described in 1866 by Johannes Müller Argoviensis in the journal Linnaea: Ein Journal für die Botanik in ihrem ganzen Umfange, oder Beiträge zur Pflanzenkunde, from specimens collected in the Swan River Colony by James Drummond. The specific epithet (cyanescens) means "becoming dark blue", referring to the colour of the leaves on drying.

== Distribution and habitat ==
This species grows in sandy soil in open forest and woodland near Metricup, Arthur River, Boscabel, Kojonup, Cranbrook and the Stirling Ranges.

== Conservation status ==
Ricinocarpos cyanescens is listed as "not threatened" by the Western Australian Government Department of Biodiversity, Conservation and Attractions.
