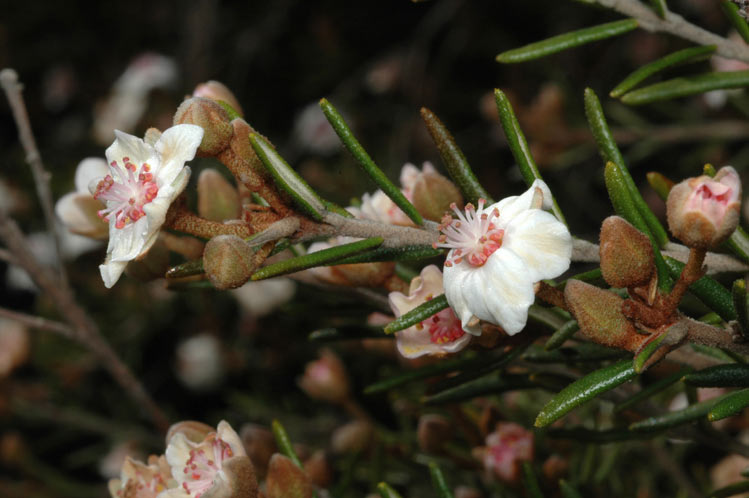
- Male flowers

Scientific classification
- Kingdom: Plantae
- Clade: Tracheophytes
- Clade: Angiosperms
- Clade: Eudicots
- Clade: Rosids
- Order: Malpighiales
- Family: Euphorbiaceae
- Genus: Ricinocarpos
- Species: R. bowmanii

Binomial name
- Ricinocarpos bowmanii F.Muell.

= Ricinocarpos bowmanii =

Western wedding bush

Species of shrub

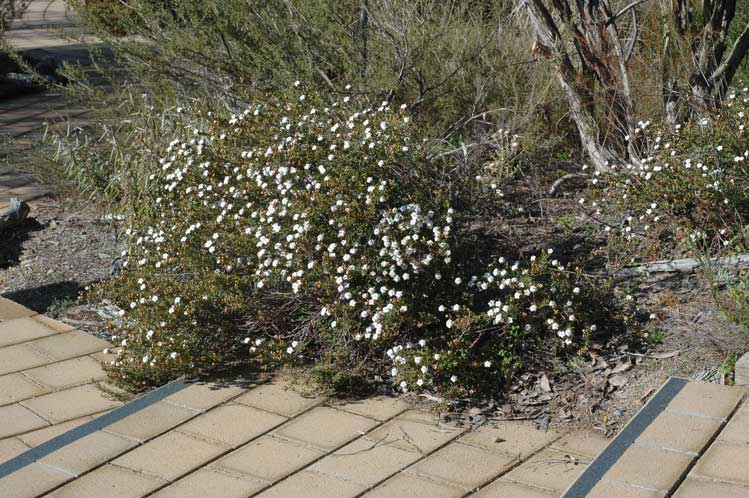
Habit in the Australian National Botanic Gardens

Ricinocarpos bowmanii, commonly known as western wedding bush or Bowman jasmine, is a species of flowering plant in the family Euphorbiaceae and is endemic to New South Wales, Australia. It is usually a monoecious shrub with linear to oblong leaves and three to six male flowers around each female flower.

== Description ==
Ricinocarpos bowmanii is a monoecious shrub that typically grows to height of up to 1 m (3 ft 3 in) and has woolly-hairy branches. The leaves are linear to oblong, 10–40 mm (0.39–1.57 in) long and 1–3 mm (0.039–0.118 in) wide on a densely hairy petiole 1–2 mm (0.039–0.079 in) long. The flowers are arranged in clusters on a peduncle 10–15 mm (0.39–0.59 in) long with three to six male flowers arranged around each female flower. The sepals are about 4 mm (0.16 in) long and joined at the base, the petals white or pink and about 10 mm (0.39 in) long. Flowering occurs from winter to early summer, and the fruit is a capsule 8–10 mm (0.31–0.39 in) long densely covered with star-shaped hairs at first, but become more or less glabrous with age.

== Taxonomy and naming ==
Ricinocarpos bowmanii was first formally described in 1859 by Ferdinand von Mueller in Fragmenta Phytographiae Australiae, from specimens collected by Edward Bowman near the junction of the Macquarie and Darling Rivers.

== Distribution and habitat ==
Western wedding bush is widespread in forest and mallee, sometimes on rocky ridges, mainly on the western slopes and western plains of New South Wales between Pilliga, Narrabri, Wagga Wagga and Tumut.
