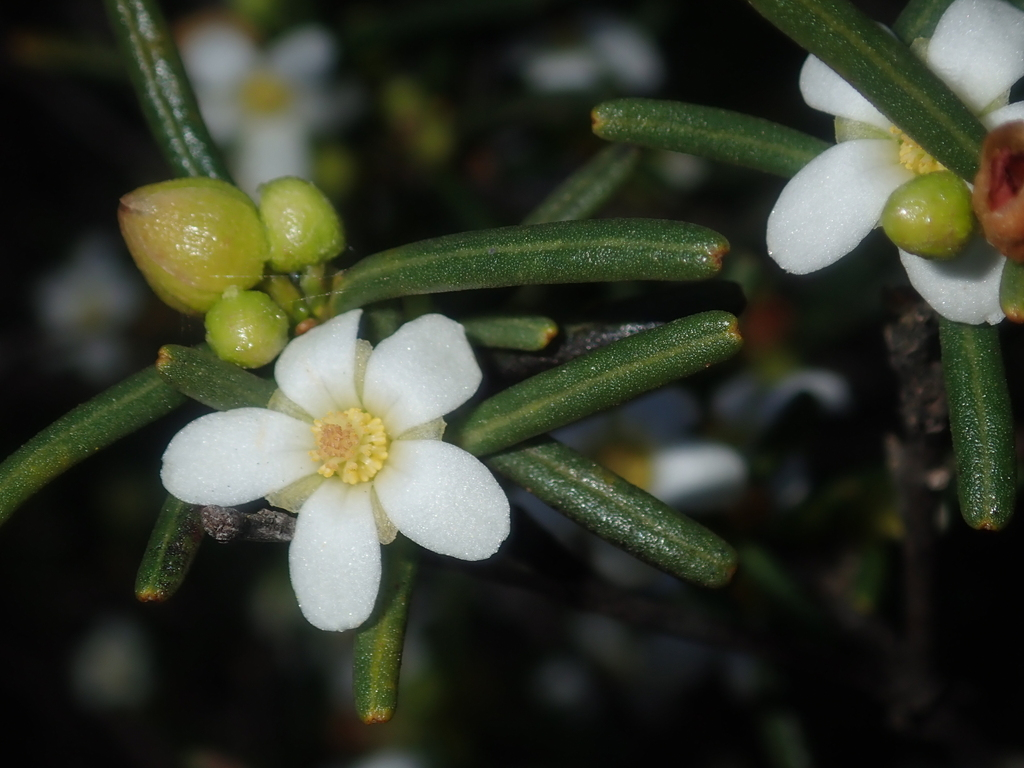

Scientific classification
- Kingdom: Plantae
- Clade: Tracheophytes
- Clade: Angiosperms
- Clade: Eudicots
- Clade: Rosids
- Order: Malpighiales
- Family: Euphorbiaceae
- Genus: Ricinocarpos
- Species: R. psilocladus

Binomial name
- Ricinocarpos psilocladus (Müll. Arg.) Benth.

Synonyms
- Bertya gummifera var. psiloclada Müll.Arg.; Bertya psiloclada (Müll.Arg.) Baill. nom. inval.; Ricinocarpus psilocladus Benth. orth. var.; Roeperia psiloclada (Müll.Arg.) Kuntze

= Ricinocarpos psilocladus =

Species of shrub

Ricinocarpos psilocladus is a species of flowering plant in the family Euphorbiaceae and is endemic to the west coast of Western Australia. It is an erect, open, monoecious or dioecious shrub with linear to narrowly oblong or narrowly egg-shaped leaves, and white or yellow flowers arranged singly, or with two to five male flowers, or a single female flower surrounded by up to three male flowers.

== Description ==
Ricinocarpos psilocladus is an erect, open, monoecious or dioecious shrub that typically grows to height of up to 1.8 m (5 ft 11 in), its young branchlets reddish and sticky. The leaves are linear to narrowly oblong or narrowly egg-shaped, 20–40 mm (0.79–1.57 in) long and 2.5–7 mm (0.098–0.276 in) wide on a petiole 1.5–3 mm (0.059–0.118 in) long. The upper surface of the leaves is glabrous and the lower surface is covered with soft, woolly white hairs. The flowers are arranged on the ends of branchlets either singly, with two to five male flowers, or a single female flower surrounded by up to three male flowers. Each flower has 5 sepals joined at the base and 5 white or yellow petals. Male flowers are on a slender pedicel 5–16 mm (0.20–0.63 in) long, the sepal lobes 3–4 mm (0.12–0.16 in) long and 2.0–2.5 mm (0.079–0.098 in) wide. The petals of male flowers are 6–9 mm (0.24–0.35 in) long and 3.5–4.0 mm (0.14–0.16 in) wide and there are 40 to 50 stamens in a central column 2–3 mm (0.079–0.118 in) long. Female flowers are on a stout pedicel 6–15 mm (0.24–0.59 in) long, the sepal lobes 3.4–4.0 mm (0.13–0.16 in) long and 1.8–2.1 mm (0.071–0.083 in) wide, the petals 7.0–8.5 mm (0.28–0.33 in) long and 2.5–4.5 mm (0.098–0.177 in) wide. Flowering has been observed from May to September, and the fruit is an elliptic capsule, 5–7 mm (0.20–0.28 in) long and 6–7 mm (0.24–0.28 in) wide.

== Taxonomy and naming ==
This species was first formally described in 1864 by 2007 by Johannes Müller Argoviensis, who gave it the name Bertya gummifera var. psiloclada, in Flora: oder Allgemeine Botanischer Zeitung from specimens collected near the Swan River by James Drummond. In 1873, George Bentham raised the variety to species status as Ricinocarpos psilocladus in Flora Australiensis. The specific epithet (psilocladus) means "glabrous shoot", referring to the pedicels which lack bracts at flowering time.

== Distribution and habitat ==
Ricinocarpos psilocladus grows in heath and shrubland, mainly in near-coastal areas between Geraldton and Northampton in the Avon Wheatbelt and Geraldton Sandplains bioregions of Western Australia.

== Conservation status ==
Ricinocarpos psilocladus is listed as "not threatened" by the Western Australian Government Department of Biodiversity, Conservation and Attractions.
