= Ricinocarpos rosmarinifolius =

Scientific classification
- Kingdom: Plantae
- Clade: Tracheophytes
- Clade: Angiosperms
- Clade: Eudicots
- Clade: Rosids
- Order: Malpighiales
- Family: Euphorbiaceae
- Genus: Ricinocarpos
- Species: R. rosmarinifolius

Binomial name
- Ricinocarpos rosmarinifolius Benth.

Synonyms
- Ricinocarpus rosmarinifolius Benth. orth. var.; Roeperia rosmarinifolia (Benth.) Kuntze

Species of shrub

Ricinocarpos rosmarinifolius is a species of flowering plant in the family Euphorbiaceae and is endemic to the Kimberley of northern Western Australia. It is an erect, slender monoecious shrub with linear leaves and inconspicuous white flowers arranged singly, or with two to four male flowers, or a single female flower surrounded by up to four male flowers.

== Description ==
Ricinocarpos rosmarinifolius is an erect, slender, monoecious shrub that typically grows to height of up to 2 m (6 ft 7 in), its young branchlets covered with white, star-shaped hairs. The leaves are linear, 30–80 mm (1.2–3.1 in) long and 1.3–2.0 mm (0.051–0.079 in) wide on a petiole 1–3 mm (0.039–0.118 in) long. The upper surface of the leaves is more or less glabrous and the lower surface is covered with soft, white, star-shaped hairs. The flowers are arranged on the ends of branchlets either singly, with two to four male flowers, or a single female flower surrounded by up to four male flowers. Each flower has 5 sepals joined at the base and 5 white petals. Male flowers are on a slender pedicel about 1 mm (0.039 in) long, the sepal lobes 1.5–2.0 mm (0.059–0.079 in) long and 1.1–1.5 mm (0.043–0.059 in) wide. The petals of male flowers are broadly egg-shaped with the narrower end towards the base, 1.5–2.0 mm (0.059–0.079 in) long and 1.1–1.5 mm (0.043–0.059 in) wide and there are about 20 stamens in a central column 2–3 mm (0.079–0.118 in) long. Female flowers are on a stout pedicel 1.5–4 mm (0.059–0.157 in) long, the sepal lobes 2–3 mm (0.079–0.118 in) long and 0.8–1.3 mm (0.031–0.051 in) wide. Flowering has been observed in February, May, June and September, and the fruit is an elliptic capsule 7.5–9.0 mm (0.30–0.35 in) long.

== Taxonomy and naming ==
Ricinocarpos rosmarinifolius was first formally described in 1873 by George Bentham in Flora Australiensis from specimens collected by Allan Cunningham. The specific epithet (rosmarinifolius) means "Rosemary-leaved".

== Distribution and habitat ==
This species grows amongst sandstone boulder in open woodland in the Northern Kimberley bioregion, between the Mitchell River and the Prince Regent River.
