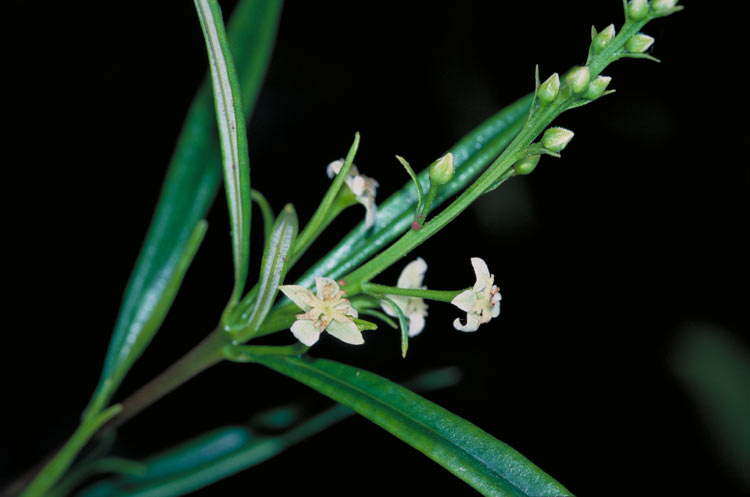

Scientific classification
- Kingdom: Plantae
- Clade: Tracheophytes
- Clade: Angiosperms
- Clade: Eudicots
- Clade: Rosids
- Order: Malpighiales
- Family: Euphorbiaceae
- Genus: Ricinocarpos
- Species: R. ledifolius

Binomial name
- Ricinocarpos ledifolius F.Muell.

= Ricinocarpos ledifolius =

Species of shrub

Ricinocarpos ledifolius is a species of flowering plant in the family Euphorbiaceae and is endemic to eastern Queensland. It is a monoecious or dioecious shrub or small tree with linear leaves and white flowers, arranged either singly, or with two or three female or two to six male flowers, or a single female flower surrounded by two male flowers.

== Description ==
Ricinocarpos ledifolius is a monoecious or dioecious shrub or small tree that typically grows to height of up to 5 m (16 ft), its young branchlets densely covered with greyish-white, star-shaped hairs. The leaves are linear to narrowly oblong, 30–75 mm (1.2–3.0 in) long and 3–12 mm (0.12–0.47 in) wide on a densely hairy petiole 2–5 mm (0.079–0.197 in) long. The upper surface of the leaves is hairy at first, later glabrous and the lower surface is softly-hairy. The flowers are arranged either as a single male or female flower, with two or three female or two to six male flowers, or with a single female flower surrounded by two male flowers. Male flowers are on a slender pedicel 8–20 mm (0.31–0.79 in) long, the sepals joined at the base and densely hairy, the sepal lobes egg-shaped, 3–5 mm (0.12–0.20 in) long, the petals white and egg-shaped, 3.5–6 mm (0.14–0.24 in) long and 2–4 mm (0.079–0.157 in) wide. Each male flower has 40 to 50 stamens. Female flowers are on a stout, hairy pedicel 7–12 mm (0.28–0.47 in) long, the sepal lobes 3–4 mm (0.12–0.16 in) long and 2–3 mm (0.079–0.118 in) long and the petals white, more or less elliptic, 3.7–4.5 mm (0.15–0.18 in) long and glabrous. Flowering occurs throughout the year with a peak from July to November, and the fruit is an ellipic capsule 5–6 mm (0.20–0.24 in) long and 7.0–7.5 mm (0.28–0.30 in) wide and covered with star-shaped hairs.

== Taxonomy and naming ==
Ricinocarpos ledifolius was first formally described in 1859 by Ferdinand von Mueller in the journal Fragmenta Phytographiae Australiae. The specific epithet (ledifolius) means "Ledum-leaved".

== Distribution and habitat ==
This species grows in rocky sites in vine thicket and vine forest between Townsville and Warwick in eastern Queensland.
