= Ricinocarpos speciosus =

Scientific classification
- Kingdom: Plantae
- Clade: Tracheophytes
- Clade: Angiosperms
- Clade: Eudicots
- Clade: Rosids
- Order: Malpighiales
- Family: Euphorbiaceae
- Genus: Ricinocarpos
- Species: R. speciosus

Binomial name
- Ricinocarpos speciosus Müll.Arg.

Synonyms
- Ricinocarpus speciosus Müll.Arg. orth. var.; Roeperia speciosa (Müll.Arg.) Kuntze

Species of shrub

Ricinocarpos speciosus is a species of flowering plant in the family Euphorbiaceae and is endemic to eastern Australia. It is a slender, erect, open monoecious or dioeciuos shrub with narrowly elliptic or narrowly oblong leaves and white flowers arranged with two or more male flowers, or with one to four female flowers surrounded by up to four male flowers.

== Description ==
Ricinocarpos speciosus is a slender, erect, open monoecious or dioecious shrub that typically grows to height of up to 3 m (9.8 ft), its young branchlets covered with dense, greyish-white, star-shaped hairs. The leaves are narrowly elliptic or narrowly oblong, mostly 50–90 mm (2.0–3.5 in) long and 8–20 mm (0.31–0.79 in) wide on a densely hairy petiole 4–10 mm (0.16–0.39 in) long. The lower surface is covered with woolly, soft, white, star-shaped hairs. The flowers arranged with two or more male flowers, or with one to four female flowers surrounded by up to four male flowers. Male flowers are on a slender pedicel 10–25 mm (0.39–0.98 in) long, the sepals joined at the base, the sepal lobes 3.5–5.0 mm (0.14–0.20 in) long. The petals are white, 7–9.5 mm (0.28–0.37 in) long and 3.0–5.5 mm (0.12–0.22 in) long, and there are 40 to 50 stamens in a central column 2.5–4.00 mm (0.098–0.157 in) long. Female flowers are on a stout pedicel 8–22 mm (0.31–0.87 in) long, the sepal lobes 4.5–6.0 mm (0.18–0.24 in) long and about 3 mm (0.12 in) wide. The petals are white, 9 mm (0.35 in) long and 5 mm (0.20 in) wide. Flowering has been observed from June to October, and the fruit is an elliptic capsule 7–11 mm (0.28–0.43 in) long and 8–11 mm (0.31–0.43 in) wide.

== Taxonomy and naming ==
Ricinocarpos speciosus was first formally described in 1864 by Johannes Müller Argoviensis in the journal Flora: oder Allgemeine Botanischer Zeitung. The specific epithet (speciosus) means "showy".

== Distribution and habitat ==
This species grows in slopes or on rocky creek banks and rocky slopes of hillsides, in wet sclerophyll forest often near the edges of rainforest, from Tewantin to Springbrook in south-east Queensland, and in Gibraltar Range National Park to near Port Macquarie in New South Wales.
