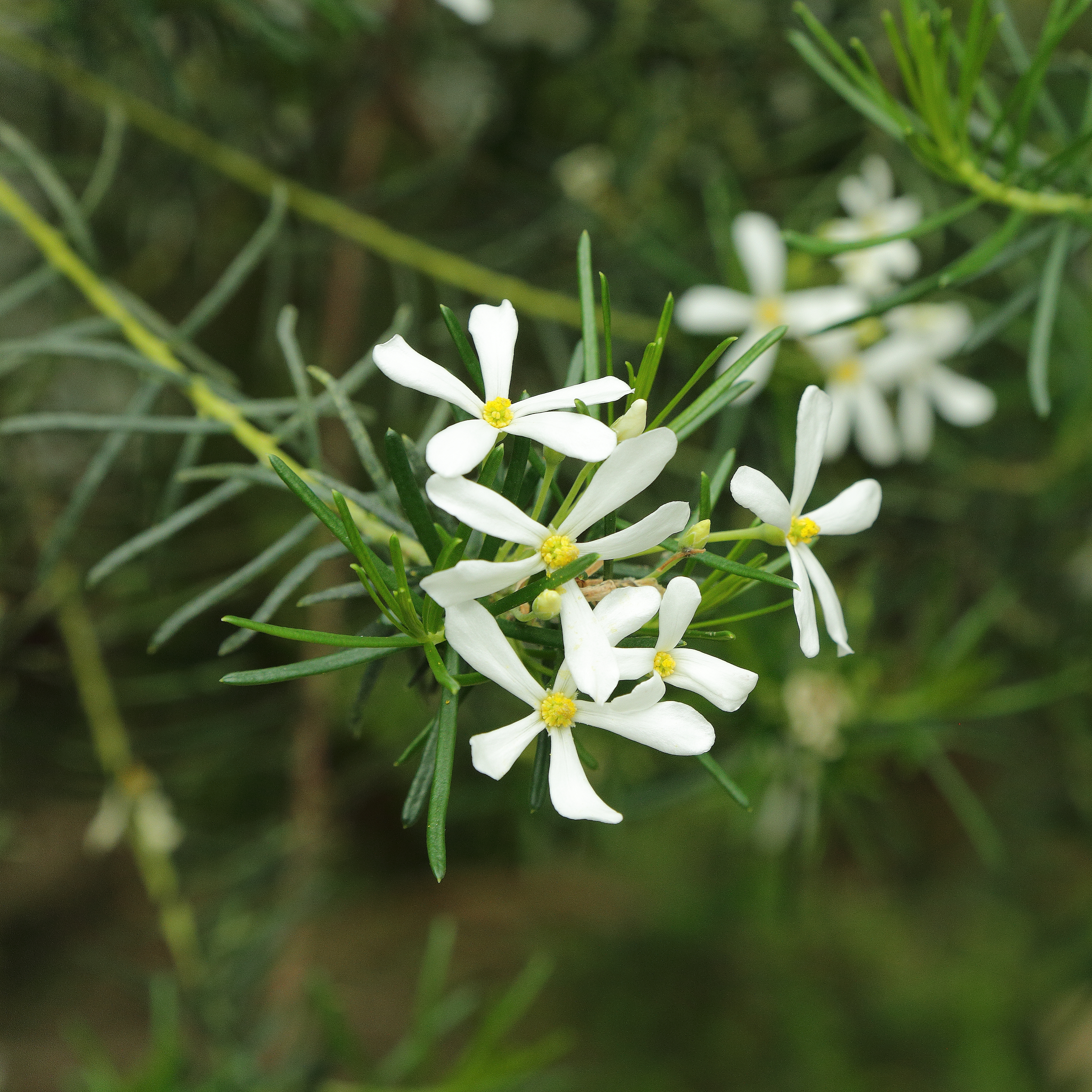
- In the Bergianska trädgården, Stockholm

Conservation status
- Priority Two — Poorly Known Taxa (DEC)

Scientific classification
- Kingdom: Plantae
- Clade: Tracheophytes
- Clade: Angiosperms
- Clade: Eudicots
- Clade: Rosids
- Order: Malpighiales
- Family: Euphorbiaceae
- Genus: Ricinocarpos
- Species: R. tuberculatus

Binomial name
- Ricinocarpos tuberculatus Müll.Arg.

Synonyms
- Ricinocarpus tuberculatus Müll.Arg. orth. var.; Roeperia tuberculata (Müll.Arg.) Kuntze

= Ricinocarpos tuberculatus =

Species of shrub

Ricinocarpos tuberculatus is a species of flowering plant in the family Euphorbiaceae and is endemic to the south-west of Western Australia. It is an erect, monoecious or dioecious shrub or small tree with linear leaves, and white flowers in a umbel with either 2 to 7 male flowers or a single female flower surrounded by up to 5 male flowers.

== Description ==
Ricinocarpos tuberculatus is an erect, monoecious or dioecious shrub or small tree that typically grows to a height of up to 4 m (13 ft), its young branchlets glabrous. The leaves are linear, 10–25 mm (0.39–0.98 in) long and 0.8–1.3 mm (0.031–0.051 in) wide with the edges curved under, on a petiole 1–3 mm (0.039–0.118 in) long. The upper surface of the leaves is glabrous and the lower surface is not visible, apart from the midvein. The flowers are arranged on the ends of branchlets in an umbel with either 2 to 7 male flowers or a single female flower surrounded by up to 5 male flowers. Each flower has 5 sepals joined at the base and 5 white petals twice as long as the sepals. Male flowers are on a slender pedicel 12–22 mm (0.47–0.87 in) long, the sepal lobes 1.5–2.5 mm (0.059–0.098 in) long and 1.0–1.5 mm (0.039–0.059 in) wide. The petals of male flowers are 10–12 mm (0.39–0.47 in) long and 2.5–4 mm (0.098–0.157 in) wide and there are about 30 stamens in a central column. Female flowers are on a stout pedicel 5–10 mm (0.20–0.39 in) long, the sepal lobes 1.2–2.2 mm (0.047–0.087 in) long and 0.8–1 mm (0.031–0.039 in) wide, the petals 10–12 mm (0.39–0.47 in) long and 3–4 mm (0.12–0.16 in) wide. Flowering has been observed in January, March, April and July and in October and November, and the fruit is an elliptic capsule, 10–12 mm (0.39–0.47 in) long and 7–8 mm (0.28–0.31 in) wide.

== Taxonomy and naming ==
Ricinocarpos tuberculatus was first formally described in 1864 by Johannes Müller Argoviensis in the journal Linnaea, from specimens collected near the Swan River by James Drummond. The specific epithet (tuberculatus) means "tuberculate".

== Distribution and habitat ==
This species grows in shrubland between granite boulders and is restricted to the area between Kellerberrin and Bruce Rock in the Avon Wheatbelt bioregion of south-western Western Australia.

== Conservation status ==
Ricinocarpos tuberculatus is listed as "Priority Two" by the Western Australian Government Department of Biodiversity, Conservation and Attractions, meaning that it is poorly known and from only one or a few locations.
