= Acacia johnsonii =

Gereera wattle

Scientific classification
- Kingdom: Plantae
- Clade: Embryophytes
- Clade: Tracheophytes
- Clade: Angiosperms
- Clade: Eudicots
- Clade: Rosids
- Order: Fabales
- Family: Fabaceae
- Subfamily: Caesalpinioideae
- Clade: Mimosoid clade
- Genus: Acacia
- Species: A. johnsonii

Binomial name
- Acacia johnsonii Leslie Pedley
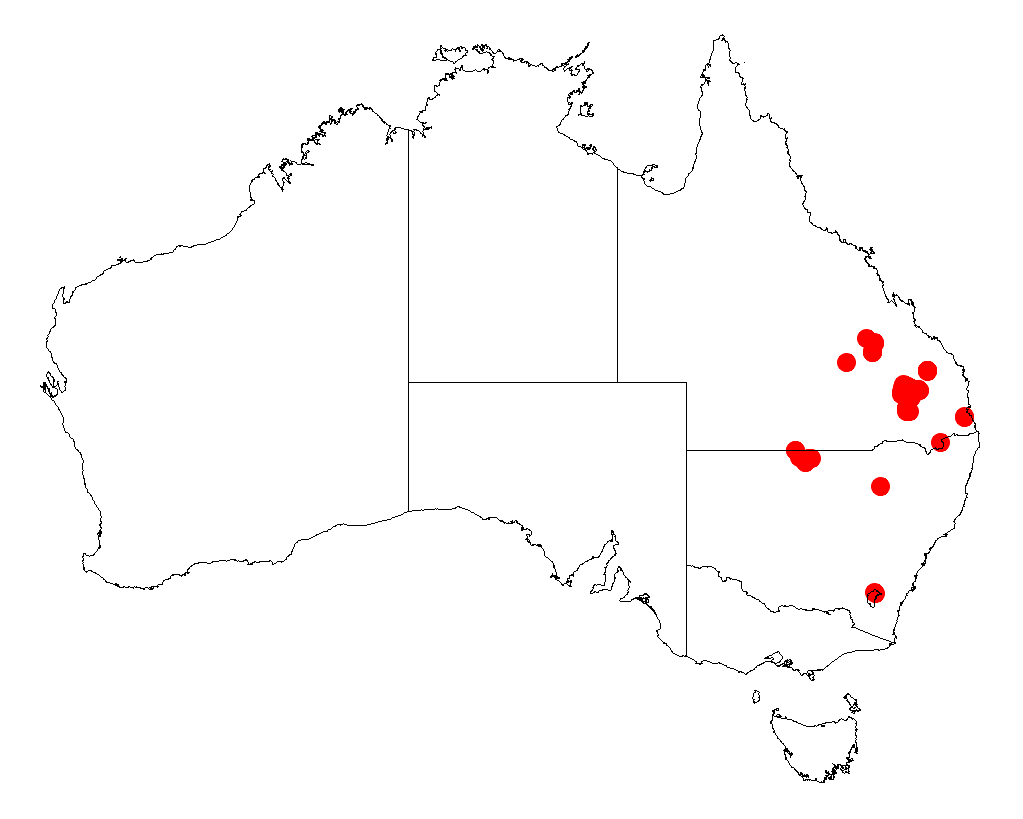
- Occurrence data from AVH

Synonyms
- Acacia rigens var. humilis Benth.; Racosperma johnsonii (Pedley) Pedley

Species of legume

Acacia johnsonii, commonly known as gereera wattle, geereva wattle or Johnson's wattle, is a species of flowering plant in the family Fabaceae and is endemic to eastern Australia. It is an erect or spreading shrub with many stems, linear to narrowly linear phyllodes, spherical heads of golden yellow flowers and firmly papery, reddish brown pods.

== Description ==
Acacia johnsonii is an erect or spreading shrub with many stems, that typically grows to a height of 1.5–3 m (4 ft 11 in – 9 ft 10 in) and has slightly resinous, hairy branchlets. Its phyllodes are held horizontally to erect, linear to narrowly linear, 10–30 mm (0.39–1.18 in) long and 1–2 mm (0.039–0.079 in) wide, commonly narrowed at the base with an eccentric to oblique point. The phyllodes are green, more or less glabrous, with a more or less pronounced midrib and one or two minute glands. The flowers are borne in a spherical head in upper axils on a peduncle 4–6 mm (0.16–0.24 in) long, each head with mostly twenty to thirty slightly resinous golden yellow flowers. Flowering occurs from August to October, and the pods are up to 70 mm (2.8 in) long and 3–4 mm (0.12–0.16 in) wide, firmly papery, reddish brown and glabrous. The seeds are oblong, 2.5–4 mm (0.098–0.157 in) long with an oblique aril.

== Taxonomy ==
Acacia johnsonii was first formally described in 1980 by Leslie Pedley in the journal Austrobaileya on the Chinchilla–Auburn road 45 km (28 mi) north of Chinchilla by Robert William Johnson in 1963. The specific epithet (johnsonii) honours the former Director of the Queensland Herbarium and the collector of the type specimen.

== Distribution and habitat ==
Gereera wattle occurs in south-eastern Queensland in the Chinchilla area and at Jericho, and is uncommon in New South Wales on the north-western plains near Enngonia. It often grows in sand in shrubby open forest or in sandplains in spinifex communities.

== Conservation status ==
Acacia johnsonii is listed as 'least concern' under the Queensland Government Nature Conservation Act 1992.

== See also ==
- List of Acacia species
