= Rodney John Francis Henderson =

Australian botanist (1938–2025)

Rodney John Francis Henderson (15 January 1938 – 9 March 2025) was an Australian botanist, who specialised in taxonomy. He worked for more than 48 years for the Queensland Public Service, 41 of those years at the Queensland Herbarium until his retirement in 2002. The families he studied included the Solanaceae, Liliaceae, Euphorbiaceae and Rubiaceae. There are about 3,500 labelled specimens in Australian herbaria collected by Henderson, sometimes with other botanists. He was often sought after as an expert in the application of the International Code of Botanical Nomenclature because of his knowledge of the code and of botanical Latin and Greek.

Henderson was actively involved with the Australian Systematic Botany Society from its formation in 1973 and was its second vice-president. He was appointed Australian Botanical Liaison Officer to Kew Gardens for the 1978–79 term. His core activities at the Queensland Herbarium were the maintenance of the plant catalogues, the Queensland Plant Census and editing the journal Austrobaileya.

He is the author of books and papers, especially of plants in the genus Dianella. The species Hibbertia hendersonii, Acacia hendersonii and Corymbia hendersonii have been named in his honour. Henderson died on 9 March 2025, at the age of 87.
