= Austrobaileya (journal) =

- Discipline: Botany
- Language: English

Publication details
- Former name: Contributions from the Queensland Herbarium
- History: 1977-present
- Publisher: Queensland Herbarium (Australia)
- Frequency: Annually
- Open access: Yes

Standard abbreviations
- ISO 4: Austrobaileya

Indexing
- ISSN: 0155-4131
- JSTOR: 01554131
- OCLC no.: 729349372
- Contributions from the Queensland Herbarium
- ISSN: 2202-0802

Links
- Journal homepage; Contributions from the Queensland Herbarium archive at JSTOR

Austrobaileya is a peer-reviewed annual scientific journal published by the Queensland Herbarium. It covers systematic botany, relating to the flora of Queensland and in particular tropical Australia. It was established in 1968 as Contributions from the Queensland Herbarium, obtaining its current title in 1977, with volume numbering restarted at 1. Since 2015, the journal is published open access, with print versions available on subscription. Older issues are available online from JSTOR.

The journal was named after the Queensland endemic genus Austrobaileya.

== Abstracting and indexing ==
The journal is abstracted and indexed in Biological Abstracts, BIOSIS Previews, CAB Abstracts, and Scopus.
