= List of plants known as toadshade =

The word toadshade is used in the common names of several species of flowering plants in the genus Trillium, including:

- Trillium albidum, the white toadshade
- Trillium cuneatum, the large toadshade, also known as the purple toadshade
- Trillium discolor, the small yellow toadshade
- Trillium recurvatum, a toadshade
- Trillium sessile, another toadshade
