= Bays Mountain =

Mountain ridge in Tennessee, United States

Coordinates: 36°21′45″N 82°51′30″W

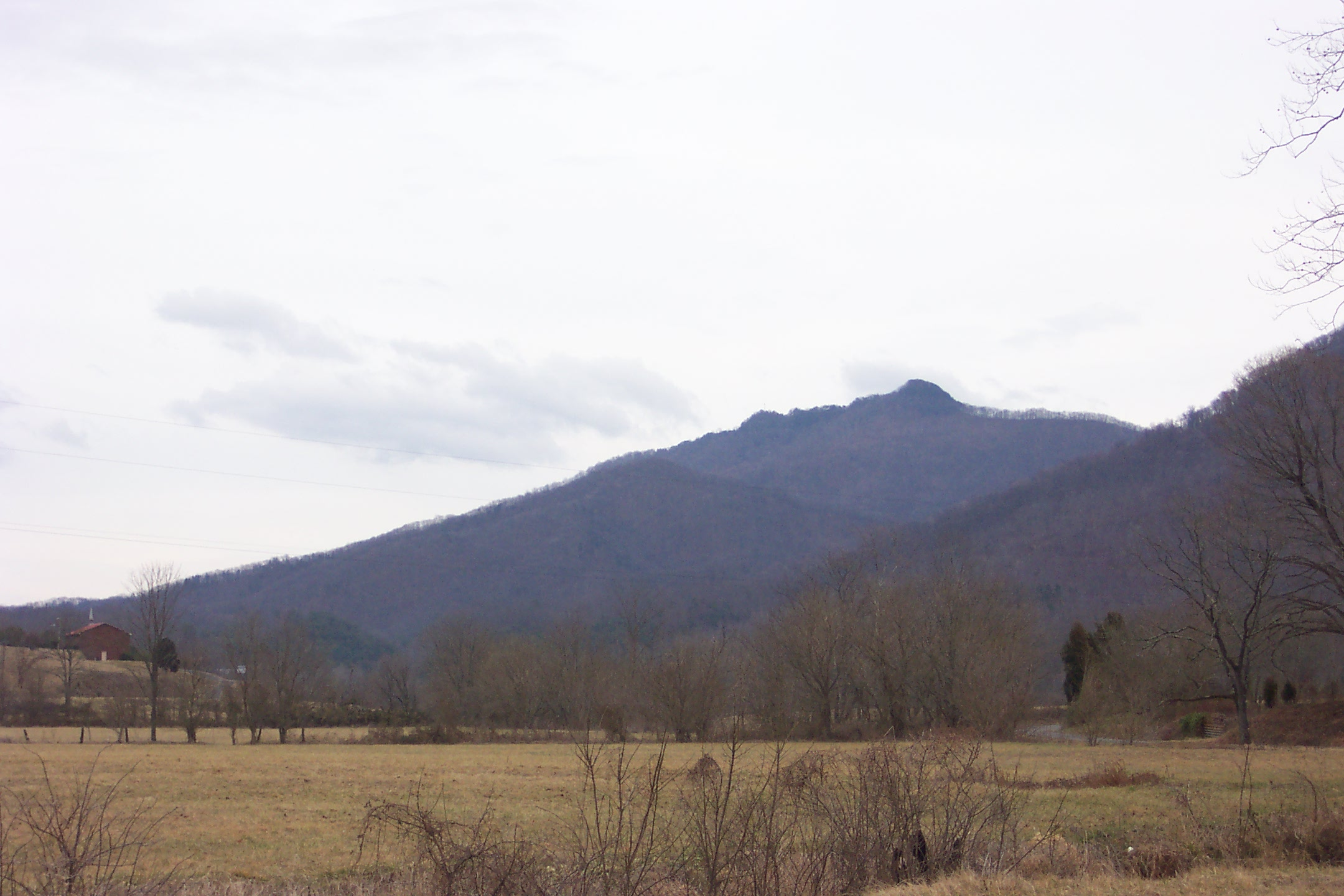
Chimneytop Mountain, highest part of the Bays Mountain ridge.

Bays Mountain is a series of ridges of the Ridge-and-Valley Appalachians, located in East Tennessee. It runs southwest to northeast, from just south of Knoxville to Kingsport.

== Geography ==
The southern segment of Bays Mountain is relatively low in elevation (up to about 1,300 feet (396.2 m)). In some places it essentially merges with the surrounding plains, especially where it is bisected by the French Broad River and the Nolichucky River. The northern segment of Bays Mountain reaches higher elevations, averaging above 2,000 feet (609.6 m) with peaks reaching up to 3,000 feet (914.4 m). It is not a single ridge but rather a series of closely related ridges, some of which have names of their own (e.g., Fodderstack, Lost, Stone, Browns). The highest peak is Chimneytop Mountain (3,117 feet (950.1 m)), a spur ridge south of the main Bays Mountain ridge.

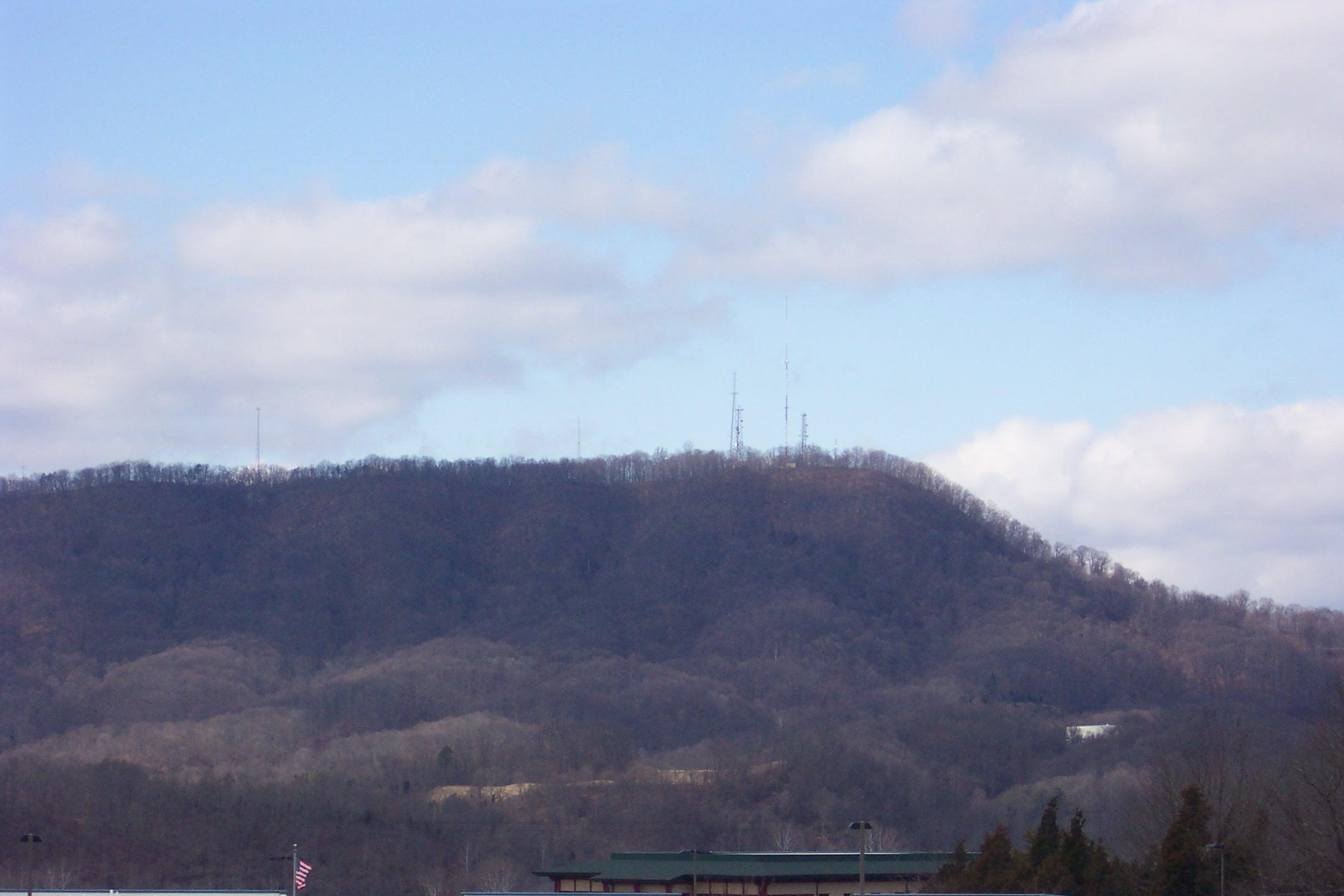
Northernmost Terminus of Bays Mountain at Kingsport, Tennessee

Bays Mountain runs just south of the Holston River, which flows northeast to southwest. At Kingsport the Holston River curves east and south at the confluence of its three tributary forks that flow from Virginia to the northeast. Bays Mountain ends abruptly at this curve of the Holston River. Kingsport is on the north side of the river, across from the northern terminus of Bays Mountain, where two ridges meet in a "V" with an impounded lake between the ridges.

== Ecology ==
Bays Mountain, along with Wallen Ridge, Powell Mountain, and Clinch Mountain, is part of the Southern Sandstone Ridges EPA Ecoregion (67f) of the Ridge-and-Valley. This ecoregion is characterized by sandstone, shale and siltstone, forming steep, forested ridges with narrow crests. Soils are typically stony and sandy with poor fertility.

Tennessee trillium (Trillium tennesseense) is endemic to Bays Mountain. The plant is known only to occur at three sites on the Sevier Shale formation on northwest slopes of the southeastern extension of Bays Mountain in Hamblen and Hawkins counties, Tennessee.

Bays Mountain Park is a 3,550-acre (14.4 km^{2}) nature park located on Bays Mountain in Kingsport. The park includes a planetarium, live native animal displays, a nature center, 19th-century living farm museum and adventure course.

== History ==
Bays Mountain is named after two Bays brothers who settled in southwest Virginia in Russell and Scott counties around 1780.
