= Red trillium (disambiguation) =

Red trillium is a common name for Trillium erectum, a flowering plant native to eastern North America.

Red trillium may also refer to:

- Trillium sessile, a flowering plant native to parts of the central and eastern United States.
- Trillium recurvatum, a flowering plant native to parts of the central and eastern United States.
