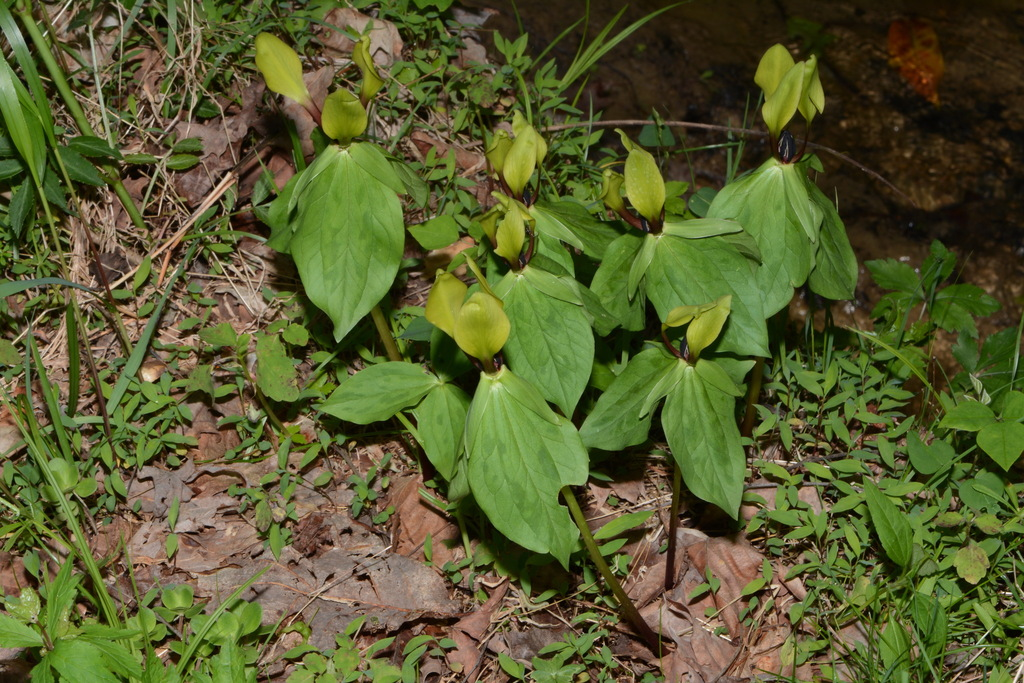
- Trillium tennesseense in bloom

Conservation status
- Critically Imperiled (NatureServe)

Scientific classification
- Kingdom: Plantae
- Clade: Tracheophytes
- Clade: Angiosperms
- Clade: Monocots
- Order: Liliales
- Family: Melanthiaceae
- Genus: Trillium
- Species: T. tennesseense

Binomial name
- Trillium tennesseense E.E.Schill. & Floden

= Trillium tennesseense =

Species of flowering plant

Trillium tennesseense, the Tennessee trillium, is a species of flowering plant in the family Melanthiaceae. It is found exclusively within two counties in northeastern Tennessee. Due to its limited range, it is designated as a critically imperiled species.

== Description ==
Trillium tennesseense most resembles T. oostingii but the two species differ with respect to several features. In particular, T. tennesseense has filaments nearly equal in length to its ovary (vs. less than half the length), a shorter ovary (2–4 mm vs. 6–16 mm), and stigma lobes distinctly longer than the ovary (vs. equal to the ovary length). When the plant is in full bloom, the flower emits a smell reminiscent of old-fashioned shoe polish.

== Taxonomy ==
Trillium tennesseense was first described and named by Edward E. Schilling and Aaron J. Floden in 2013. As of March 2025, the name Trillium tennesseense E.E.Schill. & Floden is widely accepted. A few authorities still regard it as a synonym for Trillium lancifolium Raf. It is a member of the sessile-flowered trilliums (Trillium subgen. Sessilia), a group of species typified by Trillium sessile.

== Conservation ==
The global conservation status of Trillium tennesseense is Critically Imperiled (G1). The State of Tennessee lists the species as endangered.

The IUCN Red List considers Trillium tennesseense to be a synonym of Trillium lancifolium. However, based on IUCN criteria, Trillium tennesseense is Critically Endangered (CR).

== Bibliography ==
- Lampley, Jayne A. (2021). A systematic and biogeographic study of Trillium (Melanthiaceae) (PhD). University of Tennessee.
- Lampley, Jayne A.; Gereau, Roy; Floden, Aaron; Schilling, Edward E. (2022-07-05). "A revised subgeneric classification of Trillium (Parideae, Melanthiaceae)". Phytotaxa. 552 (5): 278–286. Bibcode:2022Phytx.552..278L. doi:10.11646/phytotaxa.552.5.1. S2CID 250368253.
- Meredith, Clayton; Frances, Anne; Highland, Amy; Oliver, Leah; Floden, Aaron; Gaddy, L.L.; Knapp, Wesley; Leaman, Danna; Leopold, Susan; Littlefield, Tara; Raguso, Robert; Schilling, Edward; Schotz, Alfred; Walker, Anna; Wayman, Kjirsten (2022). The Conservation Status of Trillium in North America. Hockessin, DE and Albuquerque, NM: Mt. Cuba Center, and New Mexico BioPark Society. ISBN 979-8-9850471-0-3.
