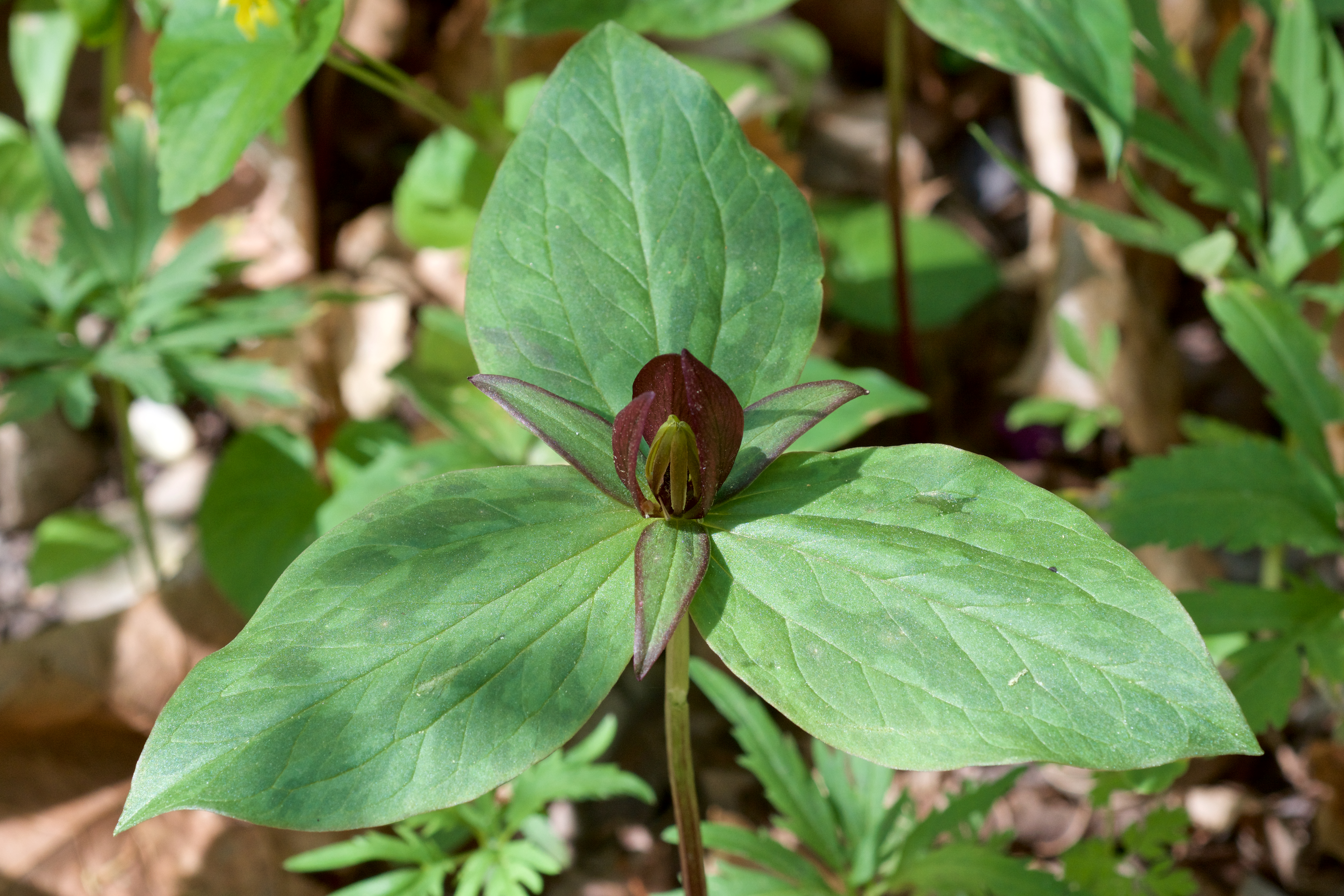
- In Newton County, Arkansas

Conservation status
- Least Concern (IUCN 3.1)

- Secure (NatureServe)

Scientific classification
- Kingdom: Plantae
- Clade: Embryophytes
- Clade: Tracheophytes
- Clade: Spermatophytes
- Clade: Angiosperms
- Clade: Monocots
- Order: Liliales
- Family: Melanthiaceae
- Genus: Trillium
- Species: T. sessile

Binomial name
- Trillium sessile L.

Synonyms
- Trillium sessile: Esdra sessilis (L.) Salisb.; Phyllantherum sessile (L.) Nieuwl.; Trillium isanthum Raf.; Trillium longiflorum Raf.; Trillium membranaceum Raf.; Trillium rotundifolium Raf.; Trillium sessile var. boreale Nutt.; Trillium sessile f. viridiflorum Beyer; Trillium tinctorium Raf.

= Trillium sessile =

Species of flowering plant

Trillium sessile is a species of flowering plant in the bunchflower family Melanthiaceae. The specific epithet sessile means "attached without a distinct stalk", an apparent reference to its stalkless flower. It is commonly known as toadshade (not to be confused with Trillium recurvatum, which is also known by that name), toad trillium or red trillium. It is also called sessile trillium or sessile-flowered wake-robin, however it is not the only member of the genus with a sessile flower.

Trillium sessile is endemic to the eastern half of the United States. It has the widest range of any species of sessile-flowered trillium. There are two subpopulations geographically separated by a large gap in central Illinois where the species is strangely absent.

Trillium sessile was one of three Trillium species described by the Swedish botanist Carl Linnaeus in 1753. It is a small perennial, herbaceous plant with three leaves, but unlike other sessile-flowered trilliums, the leaves are often not mottled. It has a single trimerous flower with three reddish-purple petals and six distinctive stamens that aid identification.

== Description ==
Trillium sessile is a perennial, clump-forming herbaceous plant with a thick underground rhizome. Like all trilliums, it has a whorl of three bracts (leaves) and a single trimerous flower with 3 sepals, 3 petals, two whorls of 3 stamens each, and 3 carpels (fused into a single ovary with 3 stigmas). A single plant has one or two erect scapes (stems) per rhizome, each scape up to 25 cm (9.8 in) tall. The sessile (stalkless) bracts are elliptic, up to 10 cm (3.9 in) long and 8 cm (3.1 in) wide. The bracts may or may not be mottled. The erect, sessile flower nestled in the middle of the three bracts has a spicy, pungent odor. The sepals are mostly green but often streaked with purple along the edges or at the base of each sepal. The average length and width of a sepal is 21 mm (0.8 in) and 5.7 mm (0.2 in), respectively. The petals are erect and long-lasting. Although their shape and color are variable, a typical plant will have elliptic, reddish-purple petals. The base of a petal is narrowed and, in some cases, will have a very short claw-like base about 2 mm (0.1 in) long. The average length and width of a petal is 24 mm (0.9 in) and 6.6 mm (0.3 in), respectively, just slightly larger than a sepal. The stamens are about half as long as the petals, with the filaments being less than half the length of the inward-facing anthers. The anther connective tissue is prominently prolonged an average of 3 mm (0.1 in) beyond the yellowish-white pollen sacs. The 6-angled ovary is short and squat, topped by three erect, brownish-black stigmas that reach to the top of the anther sacs. The fruit is ovoid or nearly round with an average height of 1.2 cm (0.5 in). The six prominent ridges merge into three near the top of the fruit, one for each stigma (which persist during fruiting). A mature fruit is whitish-green with a light pinkish tint, bearing 15–25 golden yellow seeds.

=== Identification ===
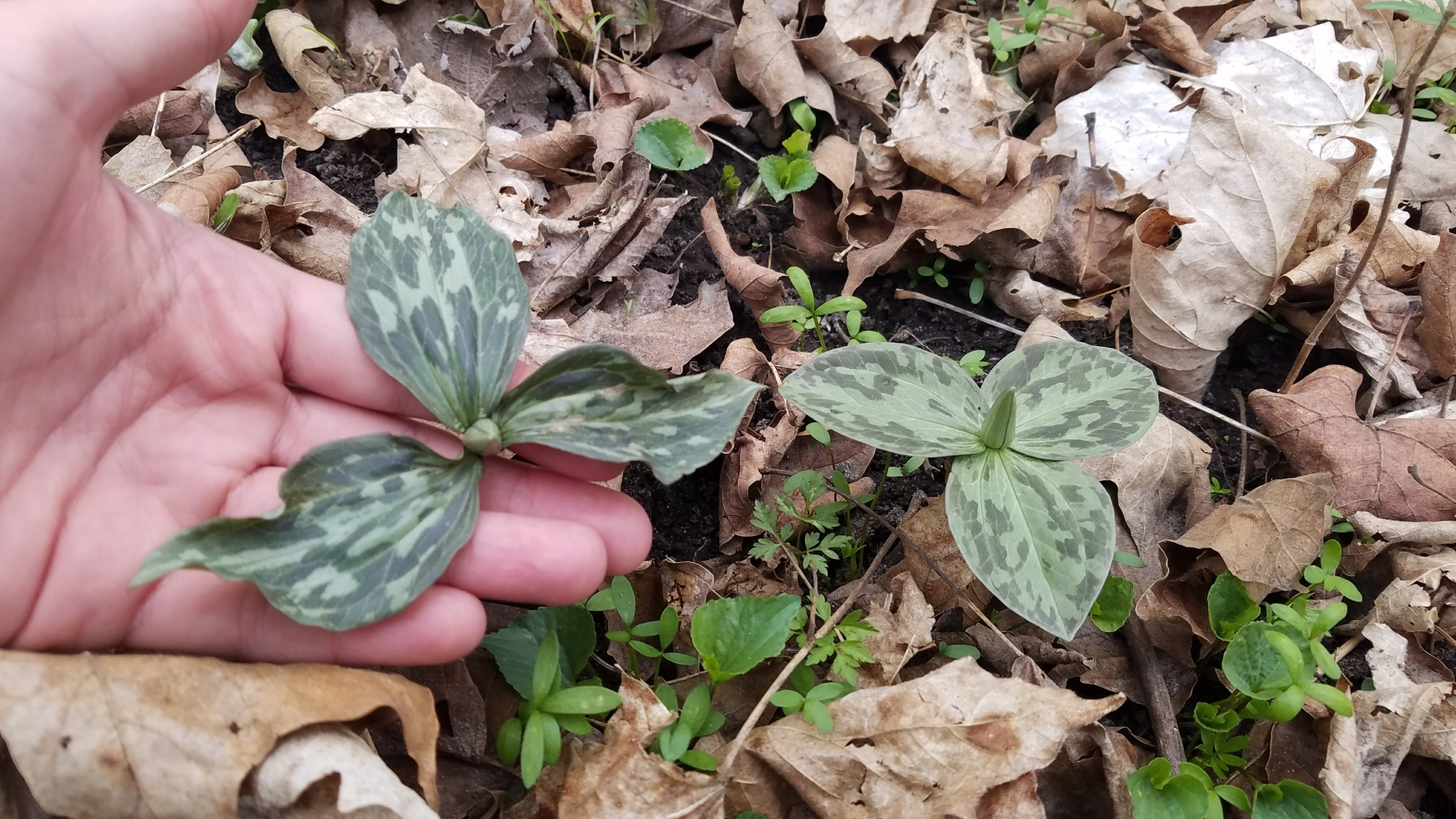
Trillium recurvatum (left) and Trillium sessile (right) side-by-side

The wide range of Trillium sessile overlaps with numerous other sessile-flowered trilliums, which tends to complicate the identification process. For instance, T. sessile and T. recurvatum are common to at least nine U.S. states (Alabama, Arkansas, Illinois, Indiana, Kentucky, Michigan, Missouri, Ohio, Tennessee). The latter species has distinctive leaves with petiole-like leaf bases and strongly recurved sepals, but T. sessile has neither of these characteristics.

T. sessile and T. cuneatum are common to four U.S. states (Alabama, Kentucky, North Carolina, Tennessee) plus other states where the latter has been introduced (such as Maryland, Michigan, and Pennsylvania). Compared to T. sessile, T. cuneatum has longer petals, shorter stamens, shorter prolonged anther connectives, and shorter stigmas. In general, T. sessile is a much smaller plant than T. cuneatum.

As a species T. sessile is distinguished by anther connectives prominently prolonged above inward-facing (introrse) anthers. Its elongated, erect stigmas are usually more than 1.5 times the length of the relatively short, nearly spherical, sharply angled ovary. The bracts are often not mottled, and those that are become less so as the season wears on. Plants of T. sessile are usually smaller than those of other species but under favorable conditions the plants may be so robust that absolute size will not distinguish them. Relative sizes and proportions are often useful, however:

- The scape is roughly three times as long as a bract
- The ratio of the average width to the average length of the sepals is 1:3.6
- The ratio of the average width to the average length of the petals is 1:3.65
- The ratio of the average length of the sepals to the average length of the petals is 1:1.16
- The ratio of the average length of the stamens to the average length of the petals is 1:1.7
- The filaments are less than half the length of the anthers
- The stigmas are usually 1.5–2 times as long as the ovary

In locales where two or more sessile-flowered Trillium species come in contact, T. sessile usually flowers earlier.

== Taxonomy ==
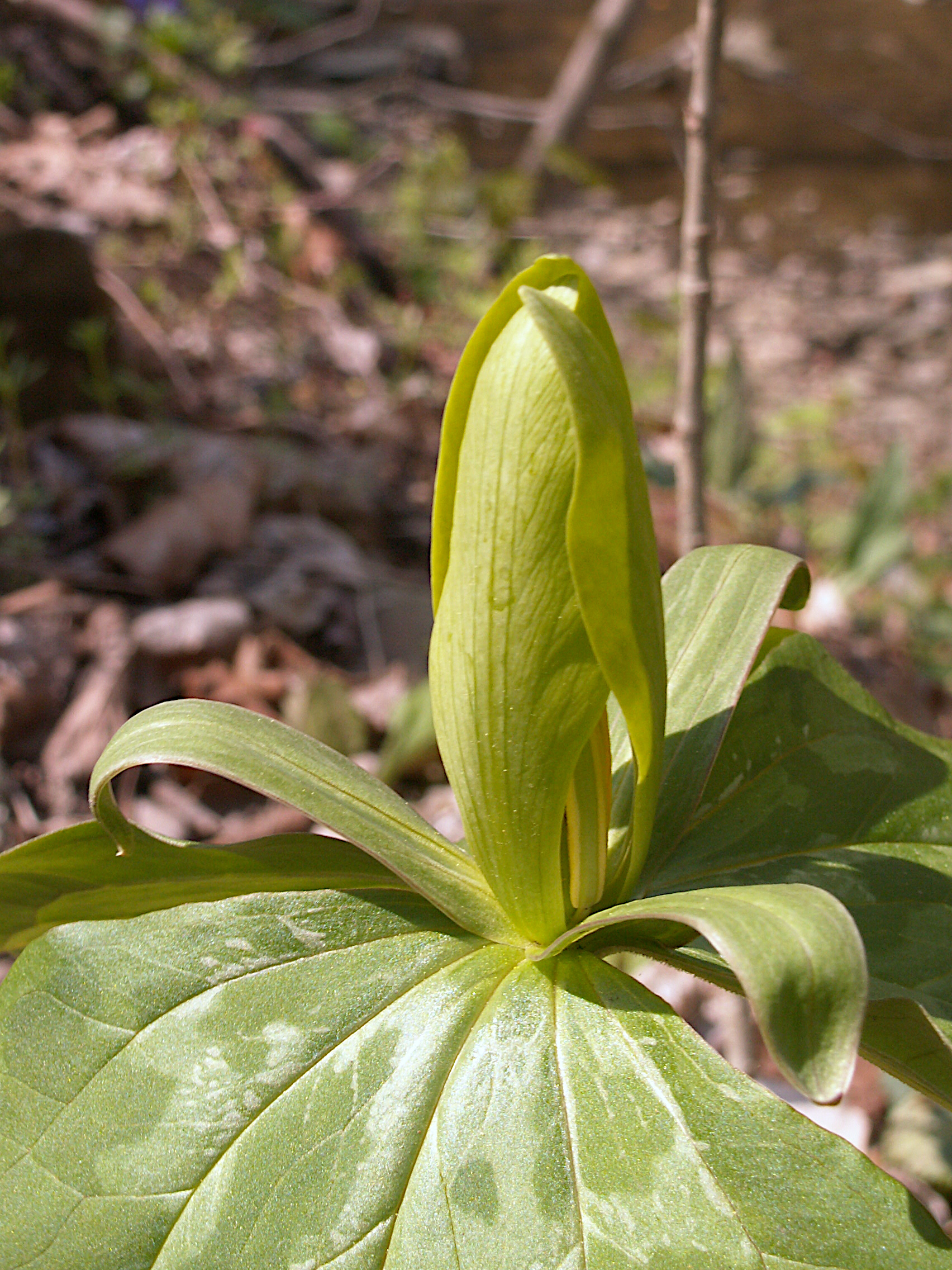
Trillium sessile f. viridiflorum Beyer

Trillium sessile was one of three Trillium species named and described by the renowned Swedish botanist Carl Linnaeus in 1753 (the other two being Trillium cernuum and Trillium erectum). In his description, Linnaeus referred to an earlier description and illustration of a taxon published by the English naturalist Mark Catesby in 1730, but Catesby's illustration was identified as Trillium maculatum by the American botanist John Daniel Freeman in 1975. Historically, the name Trillium sessile has been applied to various trilliums with a stalkless flower, but many of these are now understood to be members of several distinct taxa in subgenus Sessilia. This broad use of the name persisted into the latter half of the twentieth century. For example, the illegitimate name Trillium sessile var. californicum has been used to refer to a variety of Trillium chloropetalum, a sessile-flowered species confined to western North America (where Trillium sessile in the modern sense does not occur).

As of January 2022, Kew's Plants of the World Online accepts no infraspecific names for Trillium sessile. Some authorities recognize the name Trillium sessile f. viridiflorum Beyer, a form with yellow-green petals that occurs spontaneously throughout the range of the species. Some populations of T. sessile exhibit a range of petal color but the formal description of forma viridiflorum only includes plants with no trace of purple pigment in the petals.

Muhlenberg described the yellow-petaled variety Trillium sessile var. luteum in 1813, but the taxon was given specific rank (Trillium luteum) by Harbison in 1901. The latter is distinguished from T. sessile by its larger size, the mottling of its leaves, shorter filaments, the color of its petals, and the character of its stigmas. Apart from this, a clear yellow form of T. sessile has not been found and named.

== Distribution and habitat ==
Trillium sessile is endemic to the eastern half of the United States, ranging from Maryland in the east to the Ozarks in the heart of the Mississippi Basin, and from the southern Great Lakes region to northern Alabama. The species occurs in more U.S. states than any other sessile-flowered trillium:

- East of the Mississippi River: Alabama, District of Columbia, Illinois, Indiana, Kentucky, Maryland, Michigan, New York, North Carolina, Ohio, Pennsylvania, Tennessee, Virginia, West Virginia
- West of the Mississippi River: Arkansas, Kansas, Missouri, Oklahoma

It is most abundant in Ohio, Indiana, northern Kentucky, and Missouri, but it is strangely absent from central Illinois. This creates a distributional gap between the eastern and western subpopulations of the species. Plants from the western subpopulation (centered in Missouri) often have scapes (stems) that are taller and bracts (leaves) that are narrower than plants from the eastern subpopulation. It is not known if this geographical separation was induced by genetic or environmental factors.

T. sessile is found in rich woods, particularly in limestone areas and on calcareous soils. It is also found on alluvial floodplains and riverbanks, and occasionally on less fertile soils. It grows with other Trillium species (depending on location), bleeding-hearts (Dicentra spp.), Hepatica spp., Virginia bluebells (Mertensia virginica), mayapple (Podophyllum peltatum), woods-poppy (Stylophorum diphyllum), and violets (Viola spp.). It can withstand substantial disturbance and habitat degradation, persisting under light pasturing, along fence rows, and in brushy areas after lumbering.

As of October 2019, T. sessile is globally secure but it is vulnerable (or worse) in eight U.S. states. In particular, it is critically imperiled in the District of Columbia, New York, North Carolina, and Oklahoma.

== Ecology ==
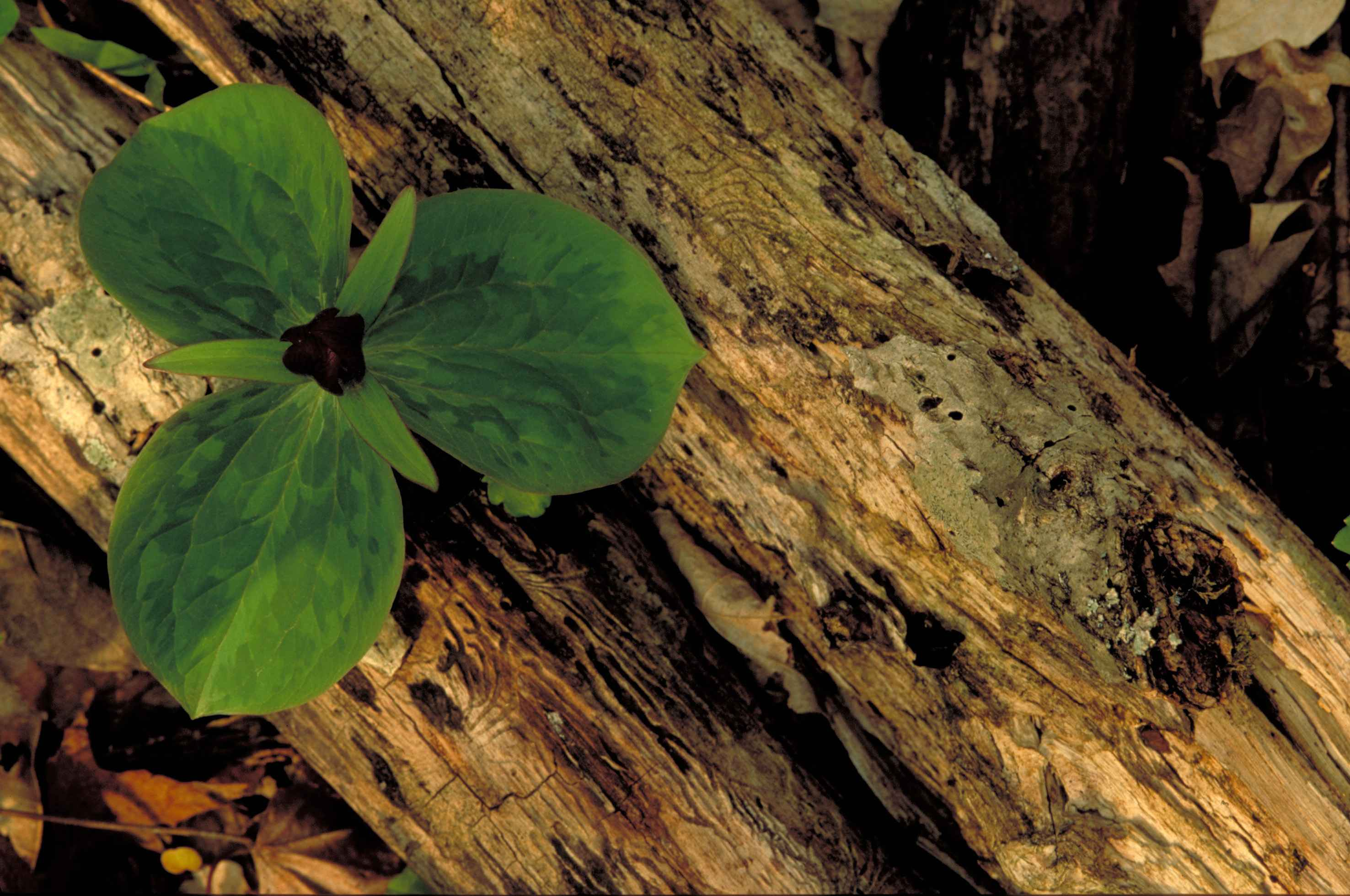
Trillium sessile growing on a log, probably the result of ant activity

Trillium sessile flowers in April in most areas. In the southern part of its range it flowers as early as late March, while its northernmost populations may not flower until mid-May. In Tennessee, fruits were observed to ripen and drop off between June 20 and July 5. The above ground parts of the plant die back by mid-summer but may persist longer in areas that do not completely dry out. The foul smelling flowers attract its primary pollinators, flies and beetles.

In general, Trillium species are myrmecochorous, that is, ants facilitate seed dispersal in most (if not all) species. Since the seeds of T. sessile have attached elaiosomes, presumably its seeds are dispersed by ants as well.

== Uses ==
Although some accounts indicate that the cooked greens of this plant may be edible as an emergency food, the entire plant, and especially the root, is known to induce vomiting. The fruit is considered a suspected poison.

Trillium sessile has been used medicinally to treat tumors. It is sometimes cited as having been used as a poultice for boils and as a panacea-like decoction, but this claim is doubtful since it is attributed to Native American tribes (the Yuki and the Wailaki) of California, where this plant is not known to occur.

Trillium sessile is sometimes grown in woodland wildflower gardens. Like many trilliums, it often does not transplant successfully from the wild.

== Gallery ==
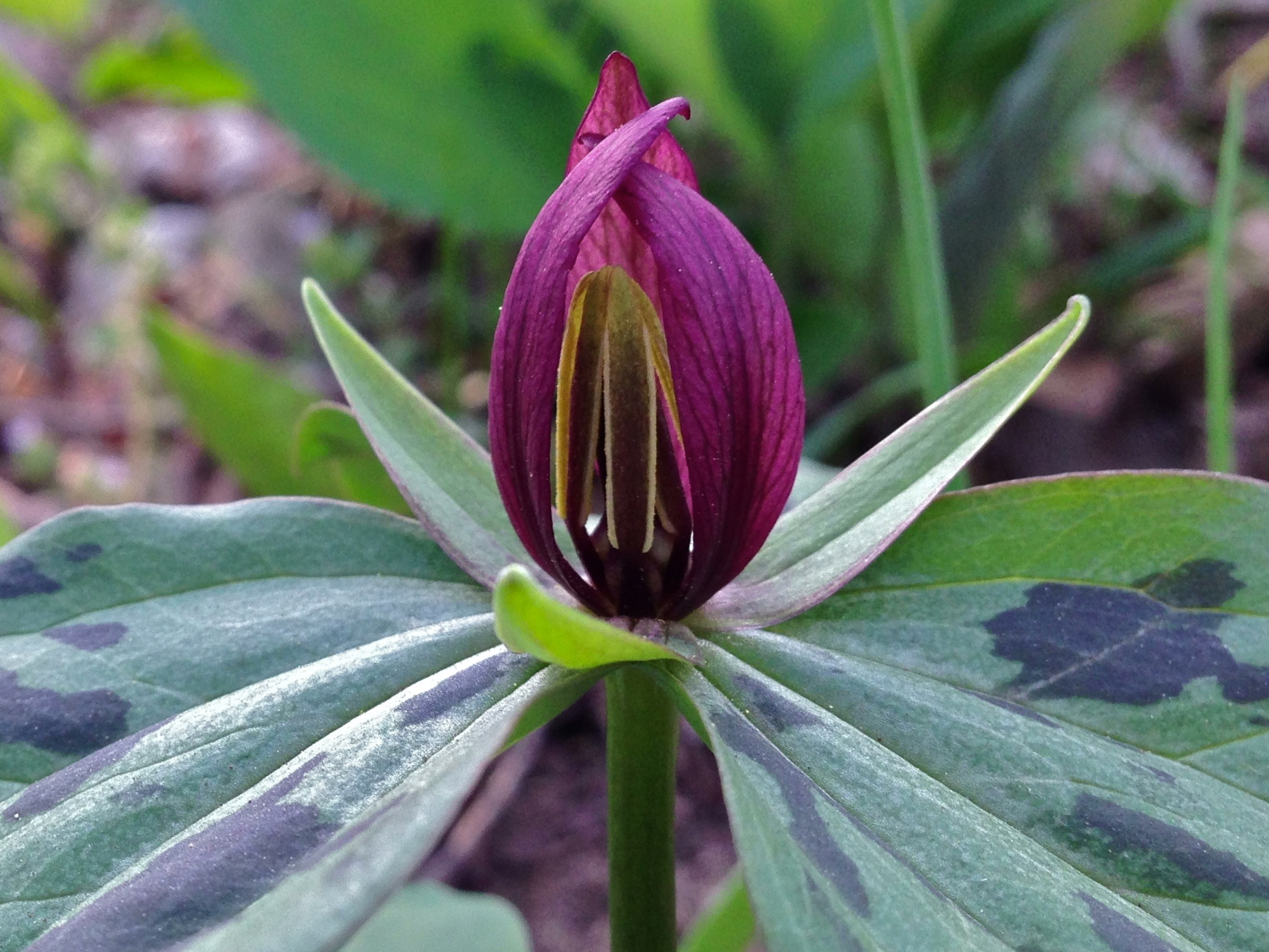
Flower with relatively long stamens (April 9 in Fairfax County, Virginia)

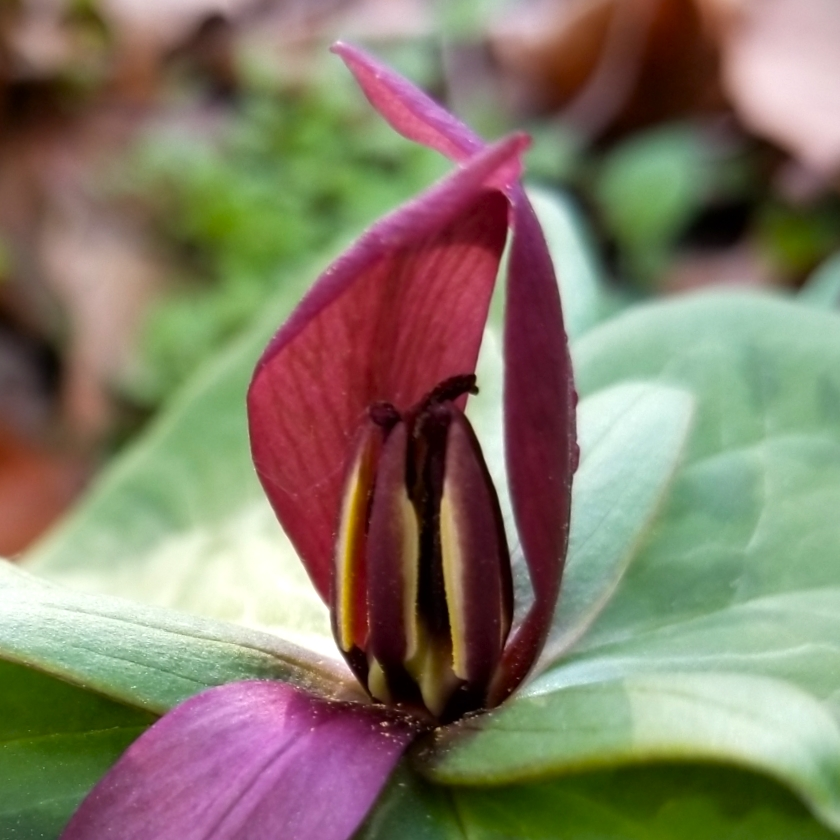
Stamens with prolonged anther connective tissue (April 20 in Clarke County, Virginia)

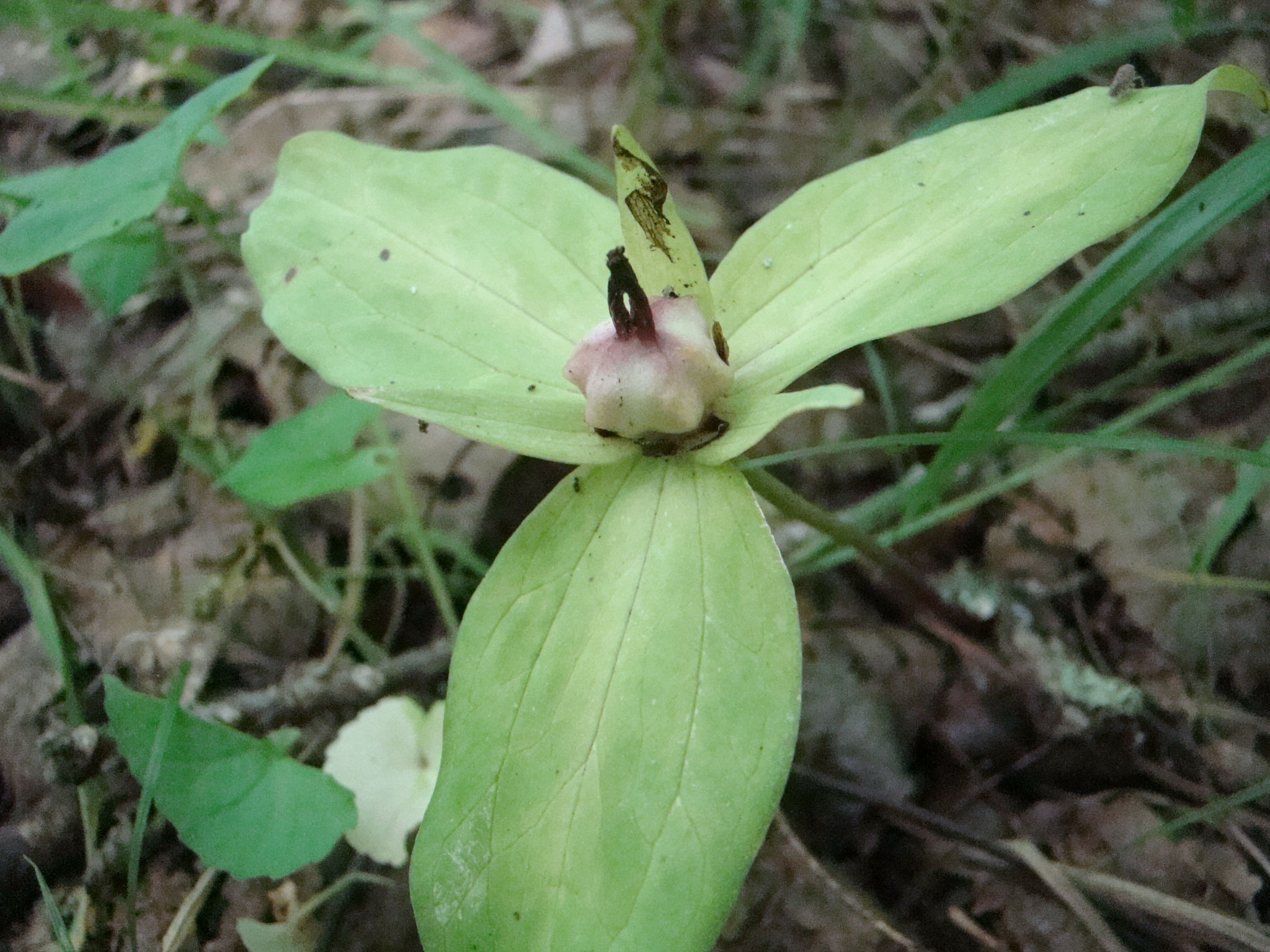
Fruit with attached stigmas (July 1 in Fayette County, Kentucky)

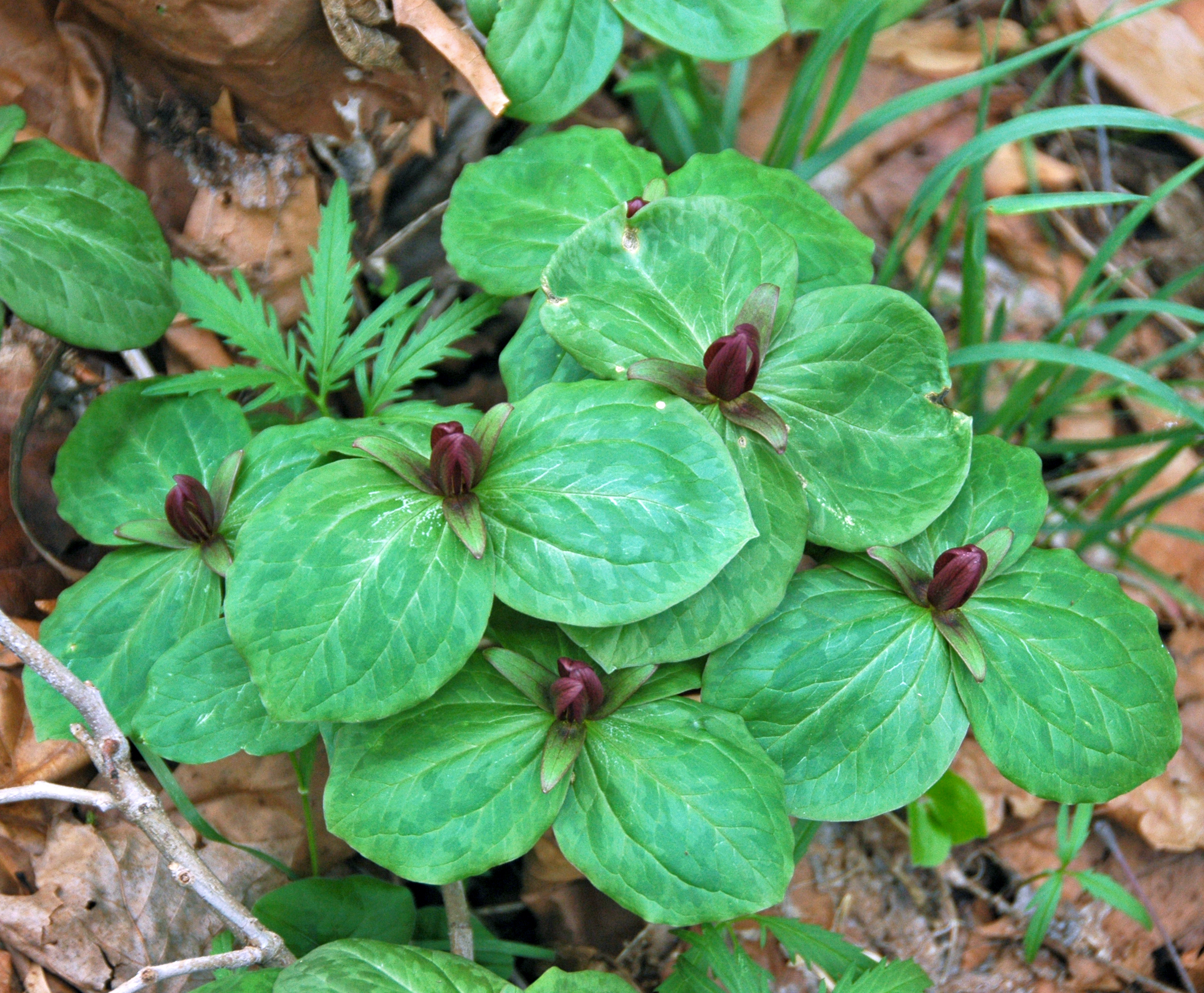
Clump of Trillium sessile (April 6 in Licking County, Ohio)

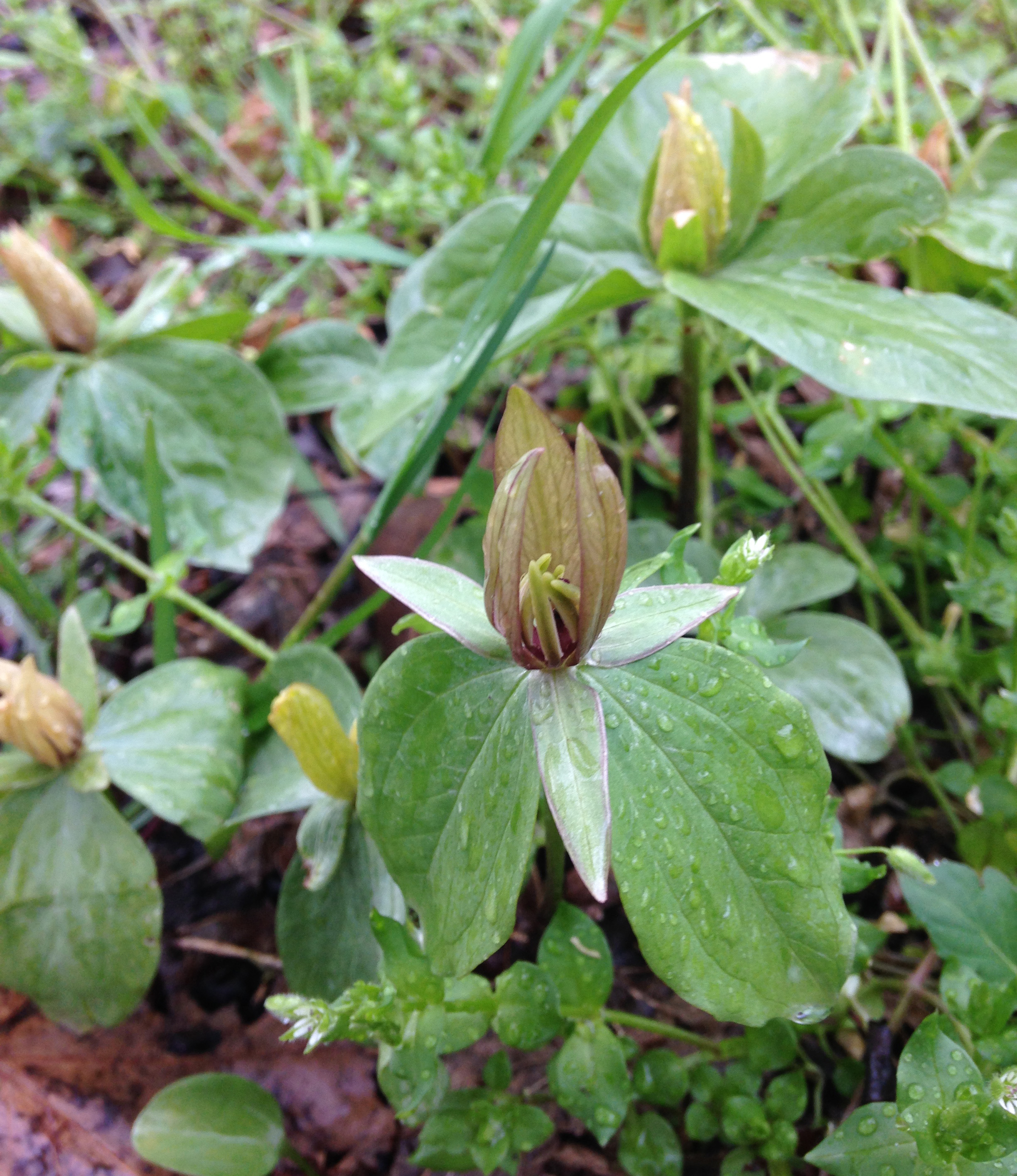
Population with yellow-green petals (April 7 in Cheatham County, Tennessee)

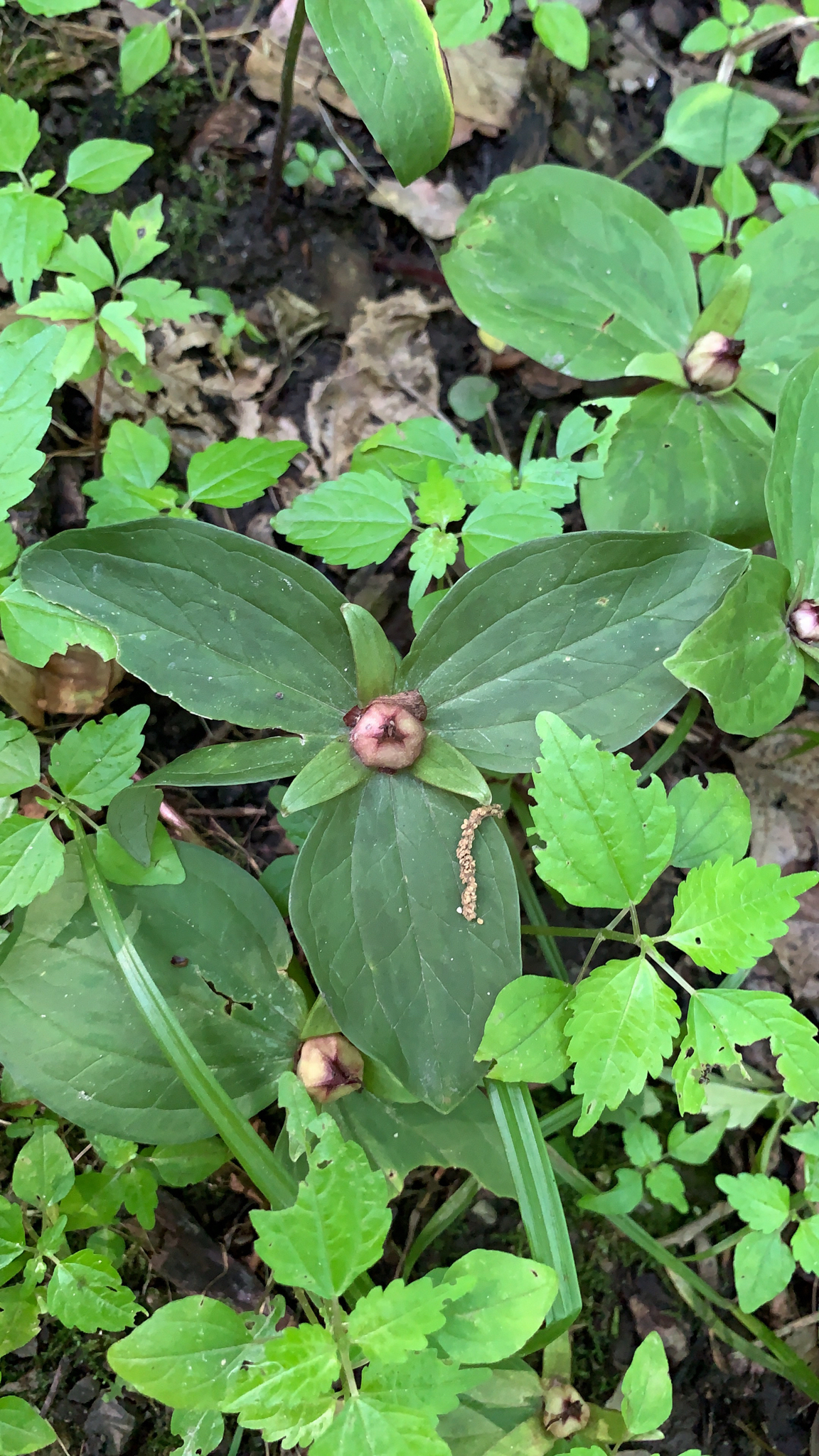
Fruiting plants (June 19 in Franklin County, Ohio)

== Bibliography ==
- Case, Frederick W.; Case, Roberta B. (1997). Trilliums. Portland, Oregon: Timber Press. pp. 228–232. ISBN 978-0-88192-374-2.
- Catesby, Mark (1734–1747). The natural history of Carolina, Florida and the Bahama Islands. Vol. 2. London: self-published.
- Freeman, J. D. (1975). "Revision of Trillium subgenus Phyllantherum (Liliaceae)". Brittonia. 27 (1): 1–62. Bibcode:1975Britt..27....1F. doi:10.2307/2805646. JSTOR 2805646. S2CID 20824379.
- Linnaeus, Carl (1753). Species Plantarum: exhibentes plantas rite cognitas, ad genera relatas, cum differentiis specificis, nominibus trivialibus, synonymis selectis, locis natalibus, secundum systema sexuale digestas (1st ed.). Stockholm: Impensis Laurentii Salvii.
- Shaver, Jesse M. (January 1959). "Trillium sessile L. in Tennessee" (PDF). J. Of Tenn. Academy of Science. 34 (1): 31–39.
