= Trillium oostingii =

Conservation status
- Critically Imperiled (NatureServe)

Scientific classification
- Kingdom: Plantae
- Clade: Tracheophytes
- Clade: Angiosperms
- Clade: Monocots
- Order: Liliales
- Family: Melanthiaceae
- Genus: Trillium
- Species: T. oostingii

Binomial name
- Trillium oostingii Gaddy

Species of flowering plant

Trillium oostingii, commonly known as Wateree trillium, is a species of flowering plant in the family Melanthiaceae. It is endemic to the central part of the US State of South Carolina, where it is only known from populations in Kershaw and Richland counties. Wateree trillium grows under a canopy of deciduous trees such as bitternut hickory, black walnut, slippery elm, box-elder, and various oak species, in rich floodplain soils. Here it forms large colonies alongside mayapple, another spring-flowering herb.

Wateree trillium most closely resembles the sessile-flowered trilliums, T. lancifolium and T. recurvatum, but is distinguished from these chiefly by floral anatomy. In T. oostingii, the anthers are only slightly incurved (curved toward the center of the flower) and have much shorter filaments, resulting in a more compressed look. According to DNA sequence analysis, T. oostingii is more distantly related to either of these species than they are to each other.

Wateree trillium has three broadly rounded, mottled leaves atop a single, 10–30 cm stem. Its flowers have three green-yellow petals and three green to maroon sepals.
