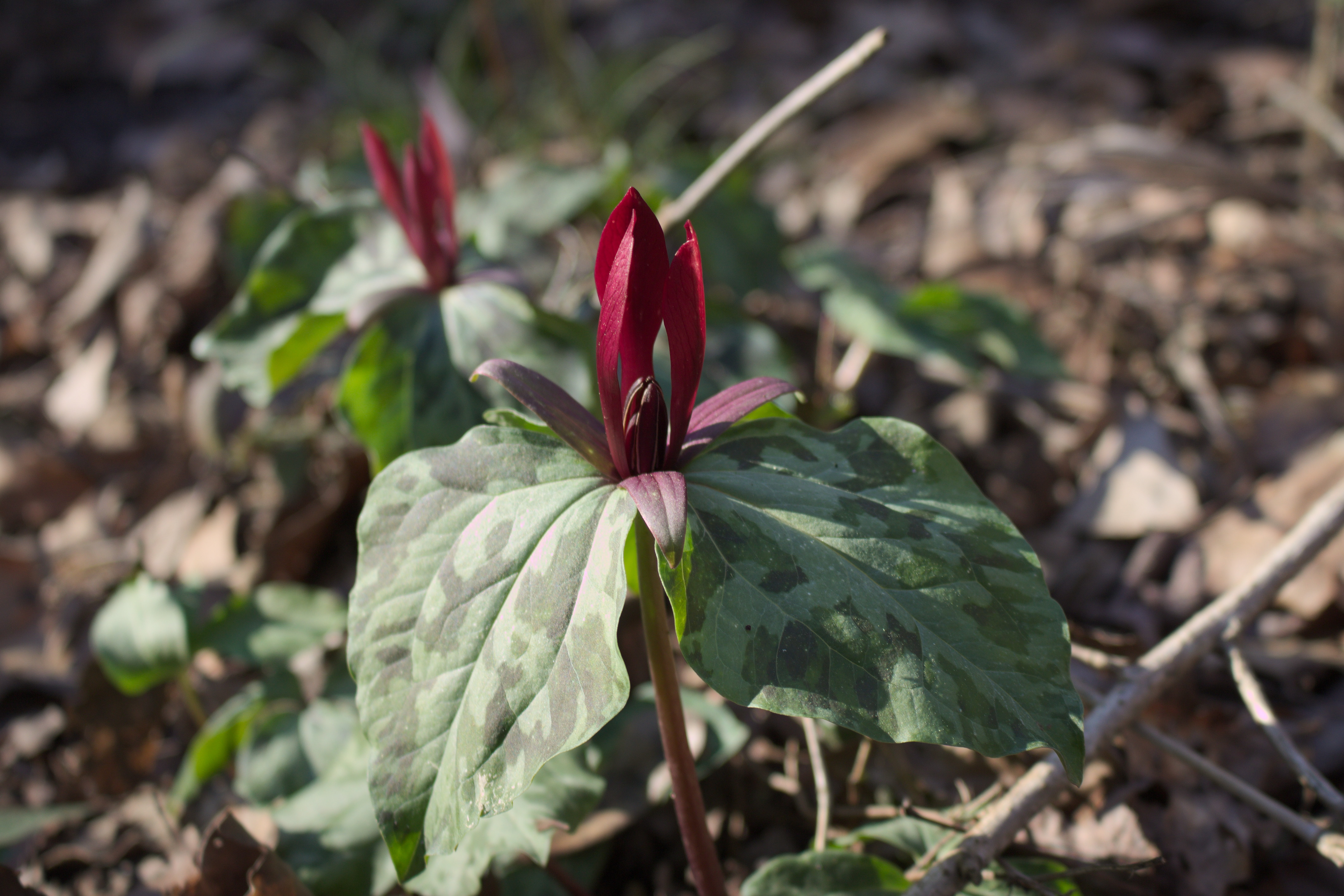

Conservation status
- Data Deficient (IUCN 3.1)

- Apparently Secure (NatureServe)

Scientific classification
- Kingdom: Plantae
- Clade: Tracheophytes
- Clade: Angiosperms
- Clade: Monocots
- Order: Liliales
- Family: Melanthiaceae
- Genus: Trillium
- Species: T. maculatum

Binomial name
- Trillium maculatum Raf.

Synonyms
- Trillium maculatum: Trillium maculatum f. luteum J.D.Freeman; Trillium maculatum f. simulans J.D.Freeman

= Trillium maculatum =

Species of flowering plant

Trillium maculatum, the spotted wakerobin or spotted trillium, is a species of flowering plant in the family Melanthiaceae. It is a member of the Trillium cuneatum complex, a closely related group of sessile-flowered trilliums. The species is endemic to the southeastern United States, ranging across Alabama, Georgia, South Carolina, and northern Florida.

== Description ==
Trillium maculatum is a perennial, herbaceous, flowering plant that persists by means of an underground rhizome. Like all trilliums, it has a whorl of three bracts (leaves) and a single trimerous flower with three sepals, three petals, two whorls of three stamens each, and three carpels (fused into a single ovary with three stigmas). It has a sessile flower (no flower stalk), erect petals, and mottled leaves. Its flower petals are deep red or reddish-purple but occasionally yellow.

== Taxonomy ==
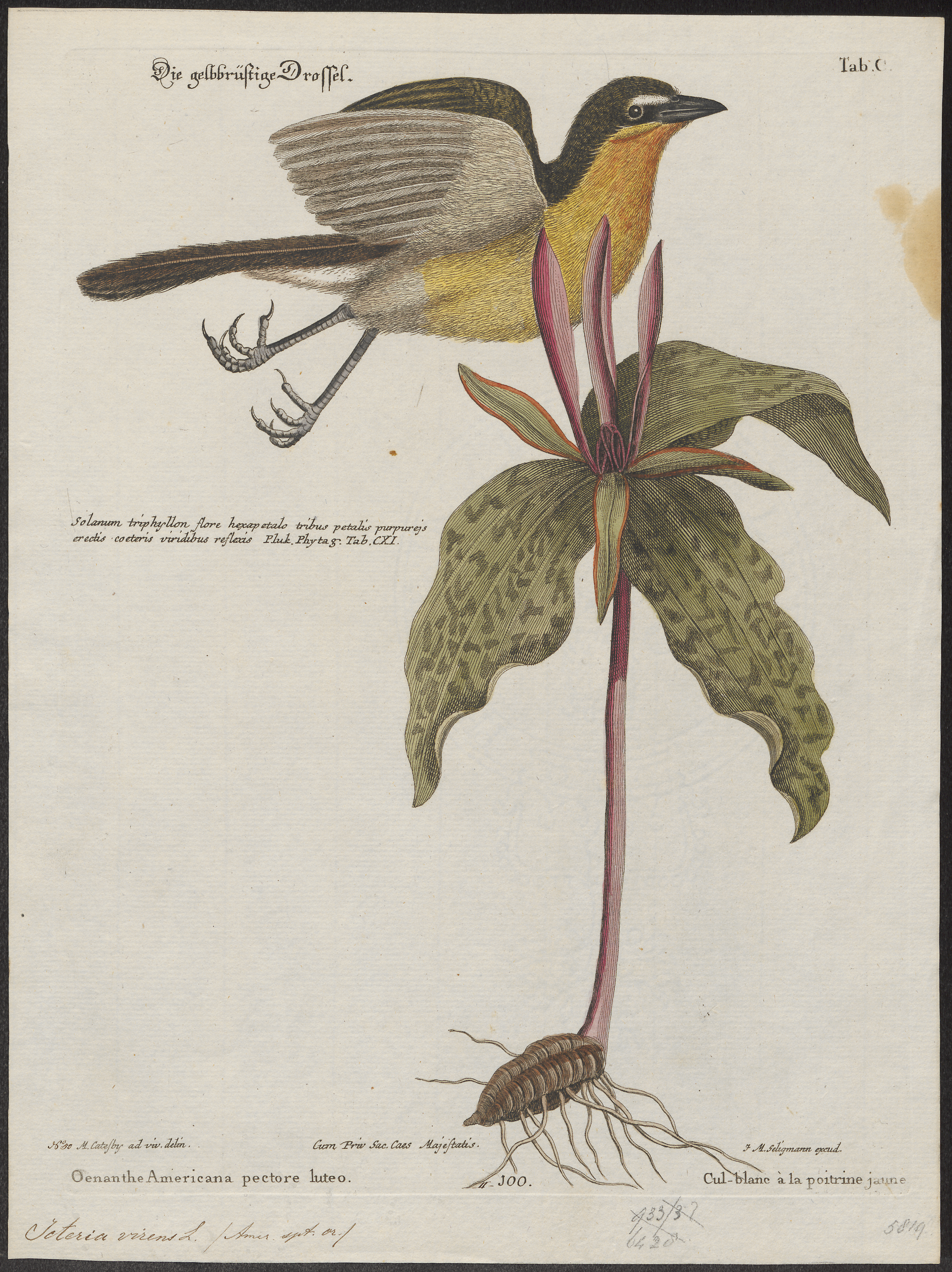
A botanical illustration of Trillium maculatum published by Mark Catesby in 1730.

Trillium maculatum was named and described by Constantine Samuel Rafinesque in 1830. The specific epithet maculatum means "spotted", a reference to the conspicuously marked leaves of some forms of this species. Although Rafinesque described a plant with spotted stems, later authors have not confirmed that character.

In his description of Trillium sessile in 1753, the Swedish botanist Carl Linnaeus referred to an earlier description and illustration of a taxon published by the English naturalist Mark Catesby in 1730. However, Catesby's illustration was identified as Trillium maculatum by the American botanist John Daniel Freeman in 1975. As a result of Linnaeus' misinterpretation of Catesby's illustration, numerous authors erroniously applied the name Trillium sessile prior to 1830.

Trillium maculatum is a member of the Trillium cuneatum complex, a group of eight taxa including Trillium luteum and Trillium cuneatum (in the strict sense). All members of the complex are sessile-flowered trilliums (Trillium subgen. Sessilia).

== Distribution and habitat ==
Trillium maculatum is endemic to the southeastern United States, ranging across South Carolina, Georgia, Alabama, and northern Florida.

== Ecology ==
Trillium maculatum flowers early February to early April.

== Bibliography ==
- Case, Frederick W.; Case, Roberta B. (1997). Trilliums. Portland, Oregon: Timber Press. ISBN 978-0-88192-374-2.
- Catesby, Mark (1734–1747). The natural history of Carolina, Florida and the Bahama Islands. Vol. 2. London: self-published.
- Freeman, J. D. (1975). "Revision of Trillium subgenus Phyllantherum (Liliaceae)". Brittonia. 27 (1): 1–62. Bibcode:1975Britt..27....1F. doi:10.2307/2805646. JSTOR 2805646. S2CID 20824379.
- Lampley, Jayne A. (2021). A systematic and biogeographic study of Trillium (Melanthiaceae) (PhD). University of Tennessee.
- Linnaeus, Carl (1753). Species Plantarum: exhibentes plantas rite cognitas, ad genera relatas, cum differentiis specificis, nominibus trivialibus, synonymis selectis, locis natalibus, secundum systema sexuale digestas (1st ed.). Stockholm: Impensis Laurentii Salvii.
