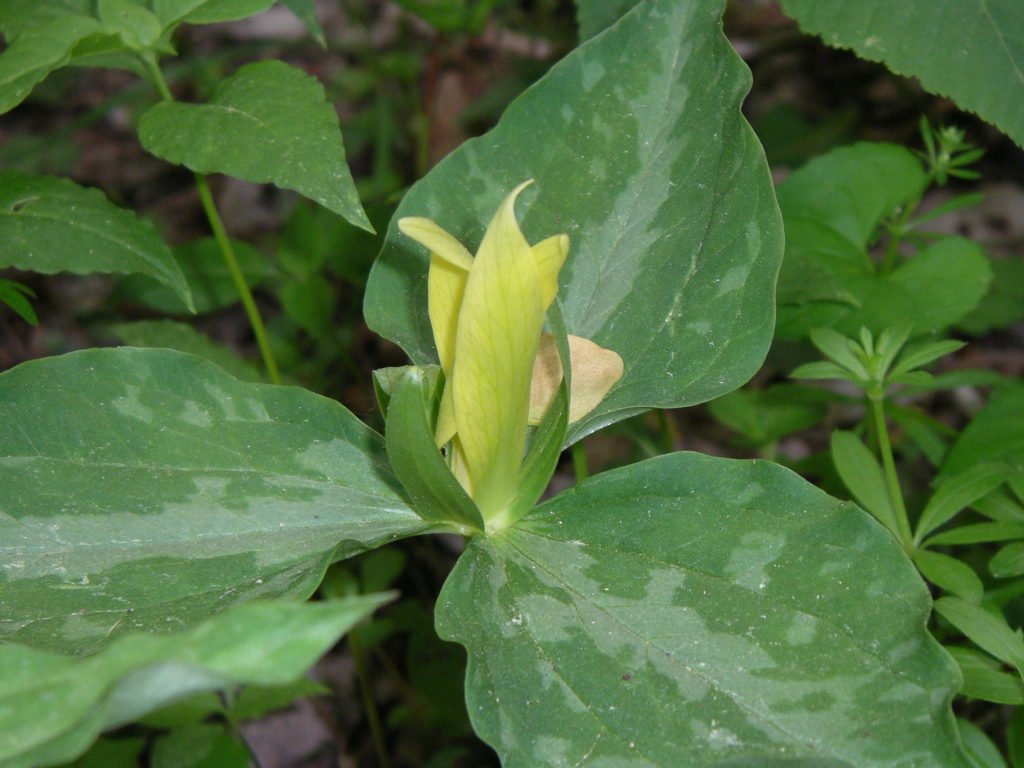

Conservation status
- Apparently Secure (NatureServe)

Scientific classification
- Kingdom: Plantae
- Clade: Tracheophytes
- Clade: Angiosperms
- Clade: Monocots
- Order: Liliales
- Family: Melanthiaceae
- Genus: Trillium
- Species: T. luteum

Binomial name
- Trillium luteum (Muhl.) Harb.

Synonyms
- Trillium luteum: Trillium sessile var. luteum Muhl.; Trillium sessile f. luteum (Muhl.) Peattie; Trillium underwoodii var. luteum (Muhl.) J.F.Macbr.; Trillium viride var. luteum (Muhl.) Gleason

= Trillium luteum =

Species of plant

Trillium luteum, the yellow trillium or yellow wakerobin, is a species of flowering plant in the bunchflower family Melanthiaceae. It is a member of the Trillium cuneatum complex, a closely related group of sessile-flowered trilliums. The species is endemic to the southeastern United States, especially in and around the Great Smoky Mountains of eastern Tennessee and western North Carolina.

== Description ==
Trillium luteum is a perennial, herbaceous, flowering plant that persists by means of an underground rhizome. Like all trilliums, it has a whorl of three bracts (leaves) and a single trimerous flower with three sepals, three petals, two whorls of three stamens each, and three carpels (fused into a single ovary with three stigmas). It has a sessile flower (no flower stalk), erect petals, and mottled leaves. It grows to 40 cm (16 in) tall by 30 cm (12 in) wide, with lemon yellow scented blooms. The large stalkless triple leaves often have grey-green marbling on the surface. It flowers in April-May beneath the bare branches of deciduous trees. After flowering and setting seed it goes dormant in summer, before appearing again in late winter.

== Taxonomy ==
In 1813, Gotthilf Heinrich Ernst Muhlenberg described the yellow-petaled variety Trillium sessile var. luteum, but the taxon was given specific rank (Trillium luteum) by Thomas Grant Harbison in 1901. The latter is distinguished from T. sessile by its larger size, the mottling of its leaves, shorter filaments, the color of its petals, and the character of its stigmas. The specific epithet luteum, which means "yellow", refers to the color of its petals.

Trillium luteum is a member of the Trillium cuneatum complex, a group of eight taxa including Trillium maculatum and Trillium cuneatum (in the strict sense). All members of the complex are sessile-flowered trilliums (Trillium subgen. Sessilia).

== Distribution and habitat ==
Trillium luteum is endemic to the southeastern United States, ranging from southeastern Kentucky to northwestern Georgia, with significant populations in and around the Great Smoky Mountains of eastern Tennessee and western North Carolina. It is especially abundant around Gatlinburg, Tennessee. T. luteum has been widely introduced elsewhere, with known populations in Maryland, Michigan, Ontario, Pennsylvania, South Carolina, and Virginia. There are hundreds of citizen science observations of T. luteum outside of its natural range, especially in Pennsylvania, Maryland, New York, and Virginia. A few disjunct populations of yellow sessile-flowered trilliums in central Alabama have been identified as T. luteum but botanists disagree on this point.

The ranges of T. luteum and T. cuneatum generally do not overlap except in Casey County in southern Kentucky, in southeastern Tennessee, and along the Little Tennessee River on the border between Tennessee and North Carolina. Hybrids will be found along these points of contact, which makes identification difficult.

== Cultivation ==
Though hardy down to −15 °C (5 °F), this plant requires a sheltered position with rich, moist leafmould in a shaded, deciduous woodland setting which mimics its native habitat in North American broadleaf forests. It must be left undisturbed to grow into a large colony. It requires some experience to grow successfully, but nevertheless has gained the Royal Horticultural Society's Award of Garden Merit.

== Bibliography ==
- Case, Frederick W.; Case, Roberta B. (1997). Trilliums. Portland, Oregon: Timber Press. pp. 204–208. ISBN 978-0-88192-374-2.
- Freeman, J. D. (1975). "Revision of Trillium subgenus Phyllantherum (Liliaceae)". Brittonia. 27 (1): 1–62. Bibcode:1975Britt..27....1F. doi:10.2307/2805646. JSTOR 2805646. S2CID 20824379.
- Lampley, Jayne A. (2021). A systematic and biogeographic study of Trillium (Melanthiaceae) (PhD). University of Tennessee.
