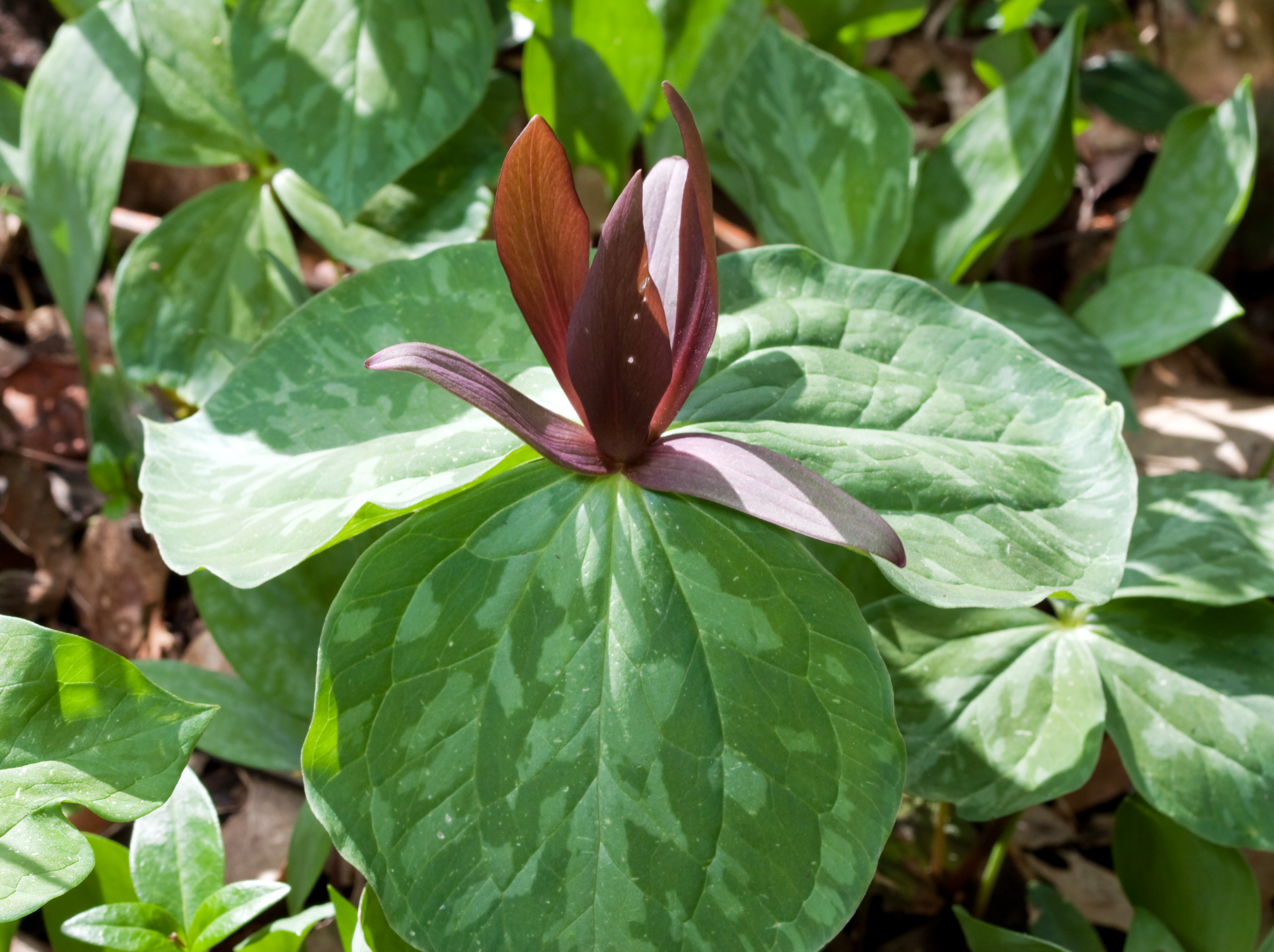
- Cheekwood Botanical Garden; Nashville, Tennessee

Conservation status
- Least Concern (IUCN 3.1)

- Apparently Secure (NatureServe)

Scientific classification
- Kingdom: Plantae
- Clade: Tracheophytes
- Clade: Angiosperms
- Clade: Monocots
- Order: Liliales
- Family: Melanthiaceae
- Genus: Trillium
- Species: T. cuneatum

Binomial name
- Trillium cuneatum Raf.
- US distribution by state

Synonyms
- Trillium cuneatum: Trillium cuneatum f. luteum J.D.Freeman; Trillium hugeri Small; Trillium sessile var. praecox Nutt.

= Trillium cuneatum =

Species of flowering plant

Trillium cuneatum, the little sweet betsy, also known as whip-poor-will flower, large toadshade, purple toadshade, and bloody butcher, is a species of flowering plant in the family Melanthiaceae. It is a member of the Trillium cuneatum complex, a subgroup of the sessile-flowered trilliums. It is native to the southeastern United States but is especially common in a region that extends from southern Kentucky through central Tennessee to northern Alabama. In its native habitat, this perennial plant flowers from early March to late April (depending on latitude). It is the largest of the eastern sessile-flowered trilliums.

== Description ==
Trillium cuneatum is a member of the Trillium cuneatum complex, along with its closest relatives, Trillium luteum and Trillium maculatum. Trillium cuneatum is paraphyletic and morphologically variable. Some populations currently considered to be T. cuneatum are more closely related to T. maculatum than to other T. cuneatum populations. It may be split in the future into several monophyletic species with greater morphological uniformity. All members of the complex are sessile-flowered trilliums.

Trillium cuneatum is a perennial, herbaceous, flowering plant that persists by means of an underground rhizome. Like all trilliums, it has a whorl of three bracts (leaves) and a single trimerous flower with three sepals, three petals, two whorls of three stamens each, and three carpels (fused into a single ovary with three stigmas). It has a sessile flower (no flower stalk), erect petals, and mottled leaves. The broad leaves surround a banana-scented flower with maroon, bronze, green, or yellow petals. It is known for its morphological variability between (and even within) geographically distributed populations.

== Taxonomy ==
Trillium cuneatum was first described by Constantine Samuel Rafinesque in 1840. The specific epithet cuneatum, which means "narrow below and wide above, wedge-shaped", refers to the tapered shape of the basal half of its flower petal. As of March 2023, the name Trillium cuneatum Raf. is widely recognized. The species is a member of the sessile-flowered trilliums (Trillium subgen. Sessilia), a group of species typified by Trillium sessile.

Based on morphology and molecular phylogenetic evidence, Trillium cuneatum sensu lato is paraphyletic. As of March 2023, available evidence supports a species complex comprising eight distinct taxa, including Trillium luteum and Trillium maculatum, plus two new species (Trillium freemanii and Trillium radiatum).

As of February 2022, Kew's Plants of the World Online accepts no infraspecific names for Trillium cuneatum. Some authorities recognize the name Trillium cuneatum f. luteum J.D.Freeman, a form marked by the absence of purple pigments from all floral parts. It occurs in the midst of purple-flowered plants throughout the range of the species. Although both have yellow (or greenish-yellow) petals, Trillium cuneatum f. luteum J.D.Freeman is not regarded as the taxonomic or genetic equivalent of Trillium luteum (Muhl.) Harb.

== Distribution and habitat ==
Trillium cuneatum is endemic to the southeastern United States, ranging from Kentucky southward to southern Mississippi, and to the eastern coast of South Carolina. It is native to Alabama, Georgia, Kentucky, Mississippi, North Carolina, South Carolina, and Tennessee. It has been widely introduced elsewhere, with naturalized populations in Illinois, Maryland, Michigan, and Pennsylvania. There are hundreds of observations of T. cuneatum made by citizen scientists outside of its native range, in more than a dozen states, but especially in Virginia, Pennsylvania, Maryland, and New York.

Trillium cuneatum prefers to grow in rich soils in mostly upland woods, especially limestone soils but also at less calcareous sites. It is found at elevations of 50–400 m (160–1,310 ft).

== Ecology ==
In the southern part of its range, from Mississippi to Georgia, Trillium cuneatum begins to flower in early March, with peak flowering occurring around mid-March. In its northernmost populations, flowering occurs in April. In the vicinity of Nashville, Tennessee, fruits were observed to ripen and drop off between July 1 and July 10.

In general, Trillium species are myrmecochorous, that is, ants facilitate seed dispersal in most (if not all) species. Since each seed of T. cuneatum has an attached elaiosome, presumably its seeds are dispersed by ants as well.

== Bibliography ==
- Case, Frederick W.; Case, Roberta B. (1997). Trilliums. Portland, Oregon: Timber Press. pp. 170–176. ISBN 978-0-88192-374-2.
- Freeman, J. D. (1975). "Revision of Trillium subgenus Phyllantherum (Liliaceae)". Brittonia. 27 (1): 1–62. Bibcode:1975Britt..27....1F. doi:10.2307/2805646. JSTOR 2805646. S2CID 20824379.
- Lampley, Jayne A. (2021). A systematic and biogeographic study of Trillium (Melanthiaceae) (PhD). University of Tennessee.
- Lampley, Jayne A.; Gereau, Roy; Floden, Aaron; Schilling, Edward E. (2022-07-05). "A revised subgeneric classification of Trillium (Parideae, Melanthiaceae)". Phytotaxa. 552 (5): 278–286. Bibcode:2022Phytx.552..278L. doi:10.11646/phytotaxa.552.5.1. S2CID 250368253.
- Shaver, Jesse M. (April 1960). "Trillium cuneatum Raf. in Tennessee" (PDF). J. Of Tenn. Academy of Science. 35 (2): 81–91.
