= Wallen Ridge =

Ridge in Tennessee and Virginia, United States

Coordinates: 36.666756°N 83.057947°W

Wallen Ridge (also called Wallens Ridge) is a ridge in the U.S. states of Tennessee and Virginia.

Wallen Ridge was named after a pioneer who explored the area in the 1760s.
