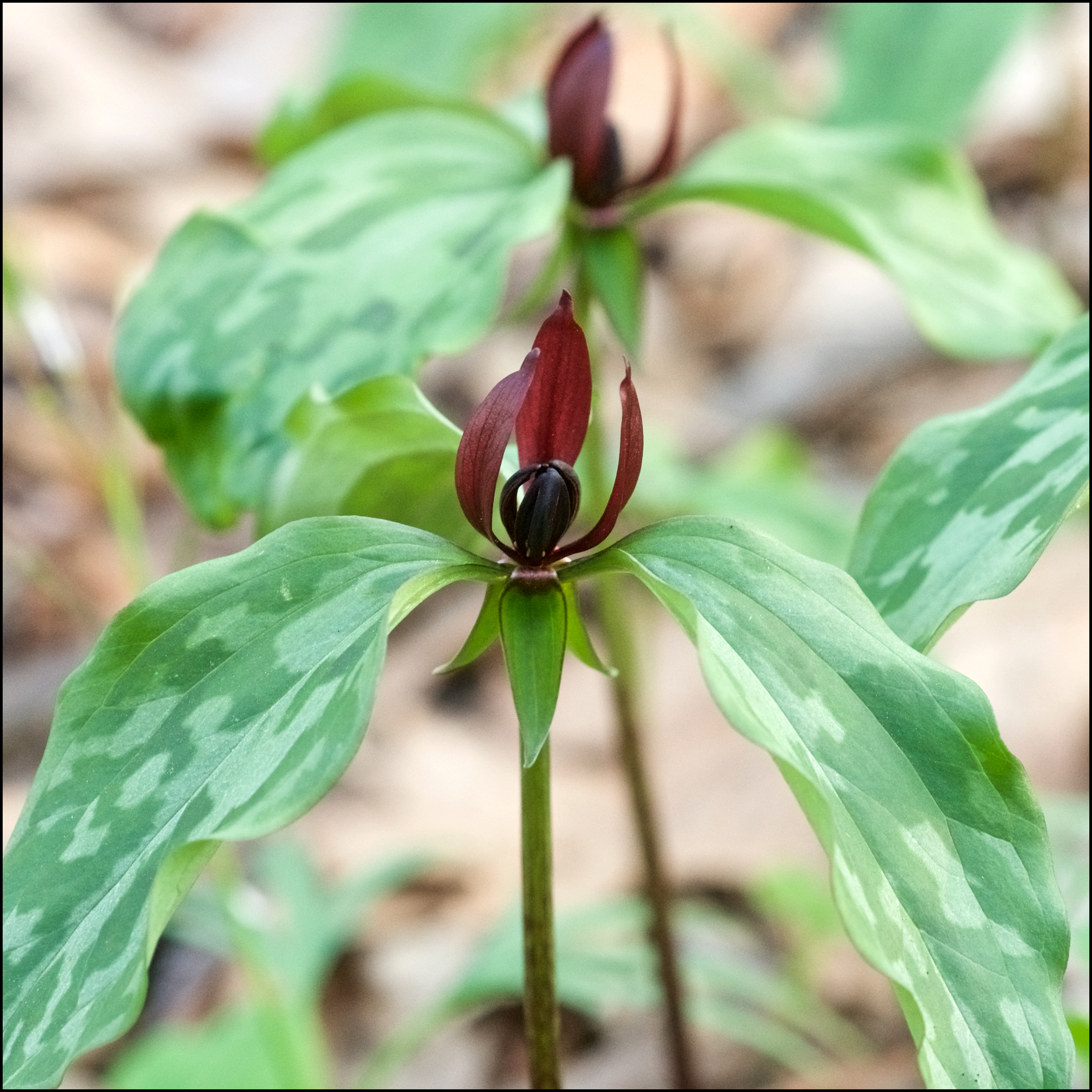
- In Little Rock, Arkansas, showing recurved sepals

Conservation status
- Secure (NatureServe)

Scientific classification
- Kingdom: Plantae
- Clade: Tracheophytes
- Clade: Angiosperms
- Clade: Monocots
- Order: Liliales
- Family: Melanthiaceae
- Genus: Trillium
- Species: T. recurvatum

Binomial name
- Trillium recurvatum L.C.Beck

Synonyms
- Phyllantherum recurvatum (L.C.Beck) Nieuwl.; Trillium unguiculatum Raf.; Trillium unguiculatum Nutt.

= Trillium recurvatum =

Species of plant

Trillium recurvatum, the prairie trillium, toadshade, or bloody butcher, is a species of perennial herbaceous flowering plant in the family Melanthiaceae. It is native to parts of central and eastern United States, where it is found from Iowa south to Texas and east to North Carolina and Pennsylvania. It grows in mesic forests and savannas, often in calcareous soils. It is also known as bloody noses, red trillium, prairie wake-robin, purple trillium, and reflexed trillium, in reference to its reflexed sepals. T. recurvatum is a host plant as well as food source for several insects and mammals.

== Description ==
Trillium recurvatum grows up to 40 cm (16 in) tall with three ovate to lanceolate bracts, mottled green, 6 to 18 cm (2 to 7 in) long and 2 to 6.5 cm (1 to 3 in) across, petiolate at maturity. The plant grows both individually and in clusters, though usually not in large groups.

The flower has three brown to maroon petals that are 1.8 to 4.8 cm (1 to 2 in) long and 0.9 to 2 cm (0 to 1 in) across, with the petal tips arching over the stamens. The sepals are recurved, pointing downwards when the flower has fully opened. The anthers are also dark purple, up to 16 mm (1 in) long. The stigmas are recurved at the tips. It is distinguished from other sessile-flowered Trillium species, such as Trillium sessile, by its reflexed sepals.

The fruit is green, sometimes streaked with purple or white, with six well-developed ridges. The seeds have an oil-rich structure called an elaiosome, which promotes dispersal by ants and other foraging insects.

The pollen ranges in diameter from 15-26μm, and has a thin, bristly covering. Like other Trillium species, the pollen of T. recurvatum is spherical, fragile, and has internal channels. T. recurvatum pollen bears the closest resemblance to that of Trillium lancifolium, with both sharing many morphological features, although with somewhat different ranges in diameter.

A spring ephemeral, T. recurvatum emerges in early spring, and becomes dormant in midsummer if flowering, and early summer if not. Younger plants, therefore, become dormant earlier than mature plants (roughly six to seven years old), which can remain in bloom throughout early summer. Mature T. recurvatum can also produce berries when pollinated, shortly before dormancy.

T. recurvatum can reproduce asexually by spreading through rhizomatous growth, as well as sexually through insect pollination. Because the species is self-incompatible, it relies on pollinators to deliver enough pollen to produce seeds, with this posing a greater barrier to sexual reproduction than deficiencies in other resources. The plant produces a high number of seeds when pollinated, although very few grow successfully.

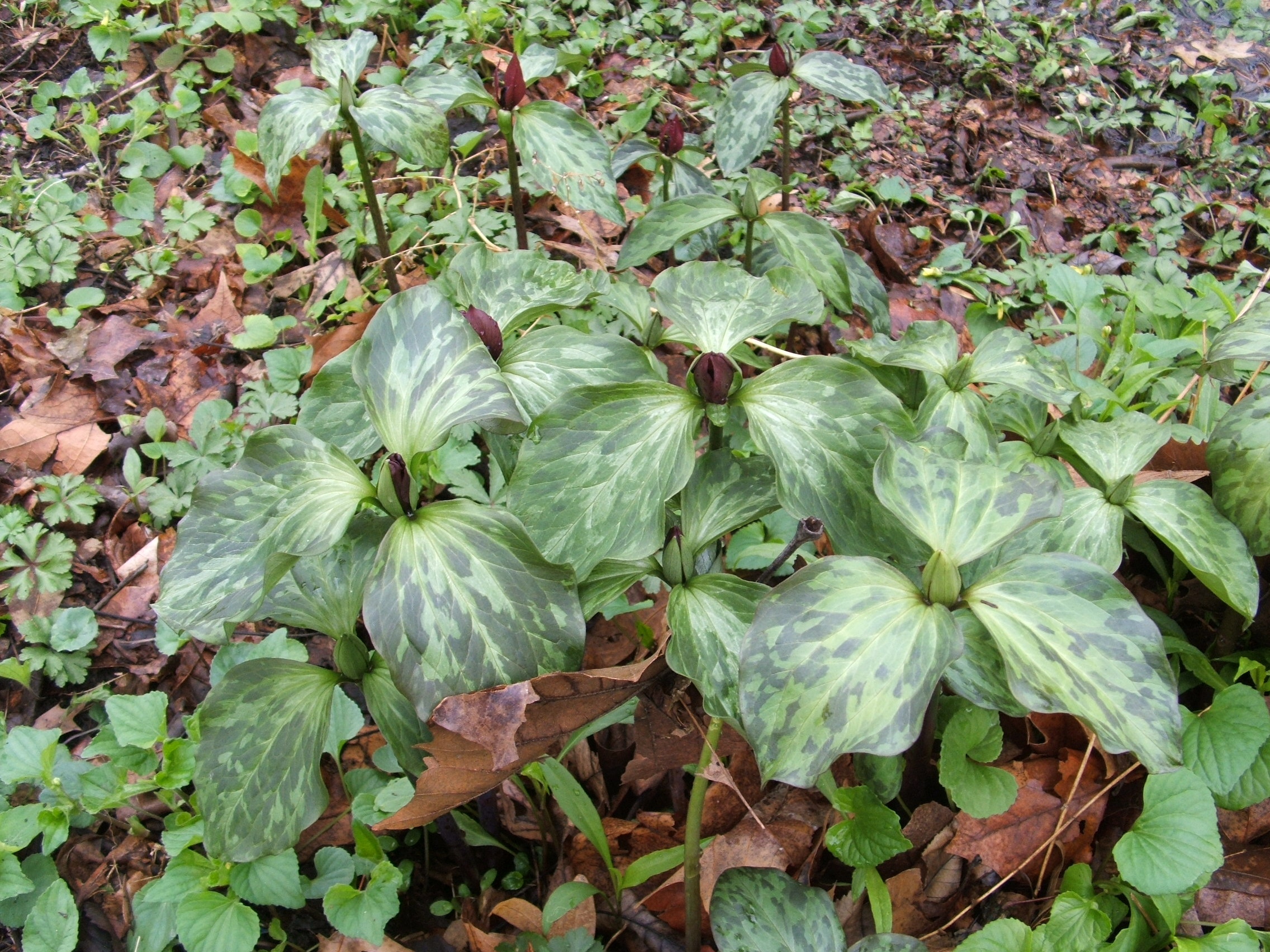
A population in the early stages of flowering, still in bud

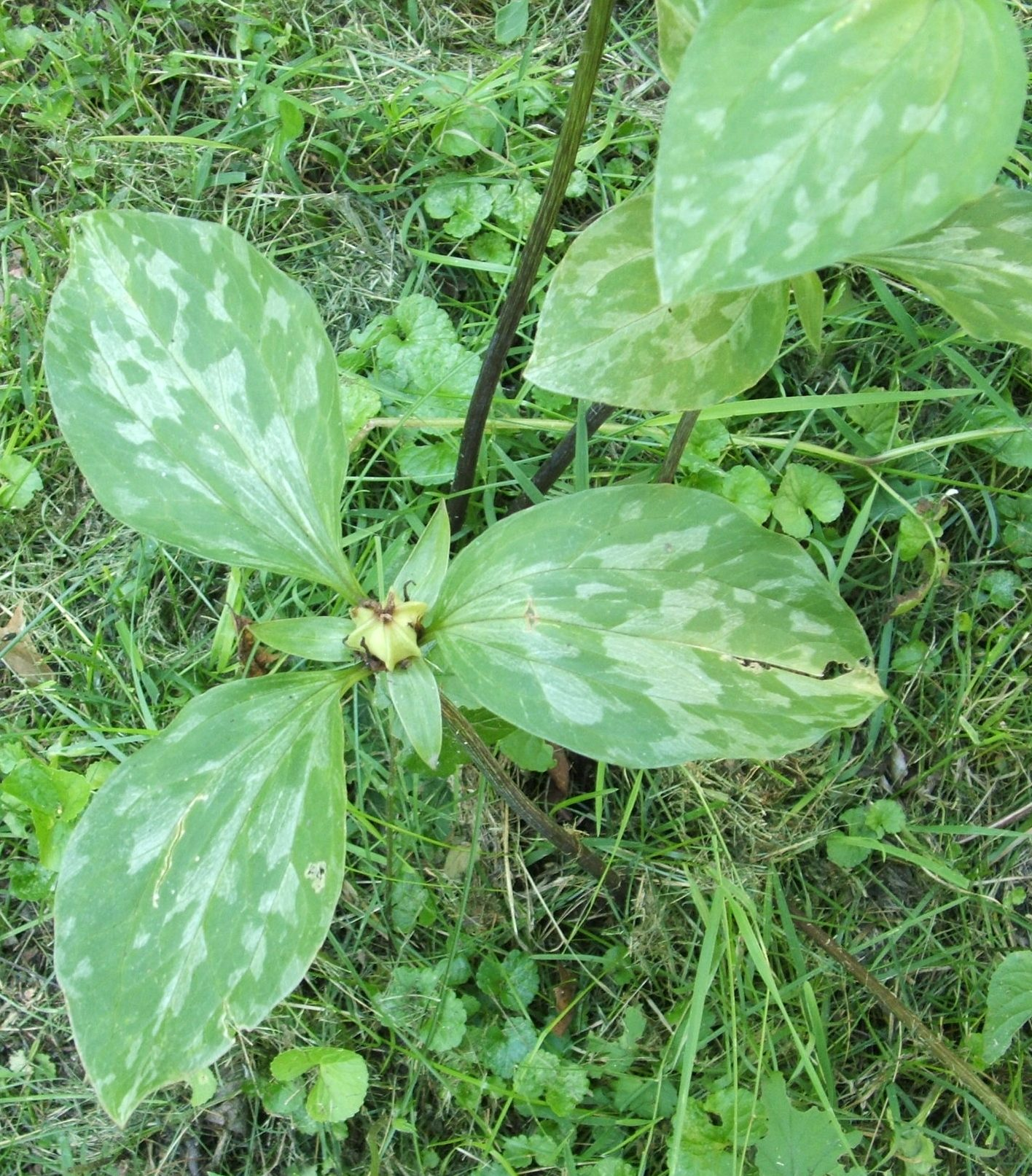
An individual with mature fruit, late in the summer

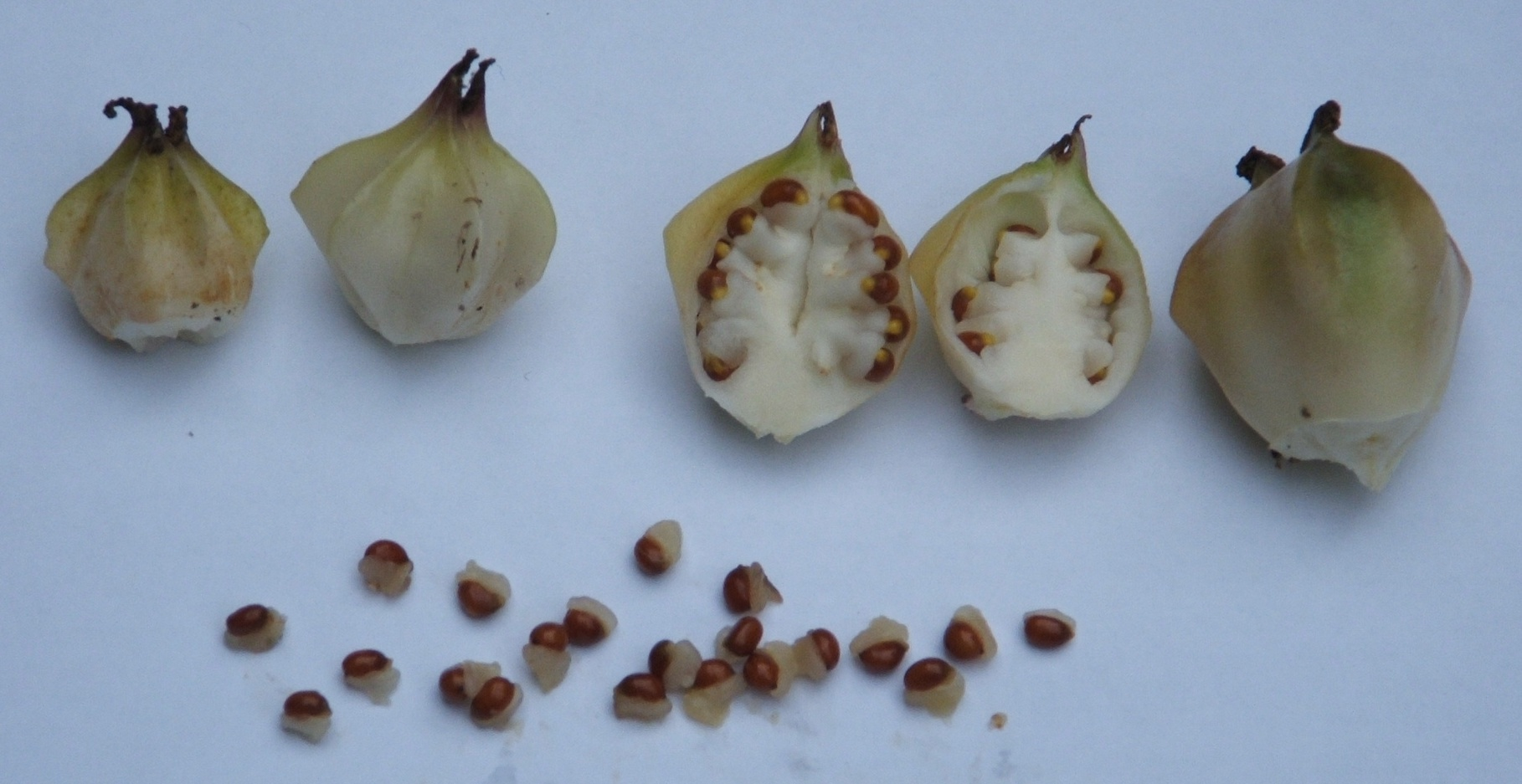
Fruits and seeds

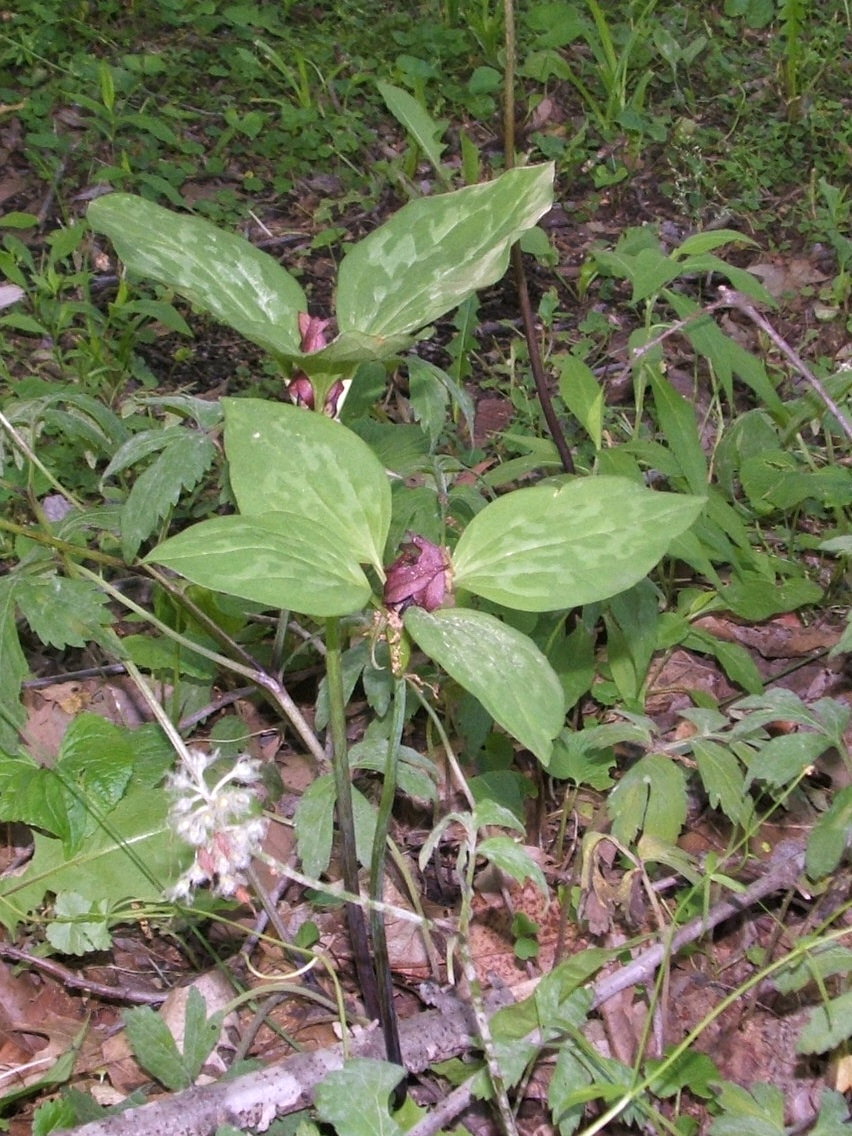
An unusual individual with four leaves

== Taxonomy ==
Trillium recurvatum was named and described by the American botanist Lewis Caleb Beck in 1826.

== Distribution and habitat ==
T. recurvatum grows in the eastern and central United States, centered in Illinois and Indiana but ranging over at least sixteen states to some extent, from eastern Oklahoma to western North Carolina, north to central Wisconsin and south to southeastern Texas. The plant can be found in deciduous forests throughout its range, although it especially prefers moister, limestone-rich soil. This includes ravines, floodplain and mesic forests, moist oak savannas (especially in Illinois and Indiana), and southern hardwood forests.

== Ecology ==
T. recurvatum serves as a host plant for Clepsis melaleucanus and Euplexia benesimilis. The species is known to be pollinated by insects, including Collops and Coleomegilla maculata, and provides food for ants, small mammals, and deer. Several plant species which grow in conditions similar to T. recurvatum are commonly found along with it, including trees like Platanus occidentalis, Acer nigrum, and Tilia americana, as well as forbs like Podophylum peltatum, Arisaema triphyllum, and Sanguinaria canadensis, among others.

== Conservation ==
T. recurvatum is common throughout much of its range. It is not considered to be globally threatened, and its status is considered secure. However, it is monitored by conservation agencies in several states at the edge of its range, where it becomes rare. For example, in Wisconsin it is considered rare or uncommon (S3) and therefore a species of special concern. In Michigan, it is considered a state threatened species and is protected by law.

Threats to T. recurvatum include habitat fragmentation and loss, overbrowsing by white-tailed deer, climate change, and invasive species. The destruction of forests for logging and agricultural development has reduced the habitat available to T. recurvatum, although not to an extent which significantly threatens the species' survival. The overabundance of white-tailed deer leads to increased browsing and decreased growth and flowering in the plant, affecting studied populations in Illinois, Pennsylvania, Indiana, and Quebec. Increases in temperature linked to climate change have caused shifts in the phenology of several plant species, including T. recurvatum, potentially disrupting their life history and negatively affecting survival. Invasive species, including Vinca minor, Alliaria petiolata, and Hesperis matronalis, compete with T. recurvatum for space and resources throughout much of its range.

== Bibliography ==
- Beck, Lewis Caleb (1826). "Contributions towards the botany of the states of Illinois and Missouri". American Journal of Science and Arts. 11 (1): 167–182.
