= Elaiosome =

Fleshy structures attached to the seeds of plants

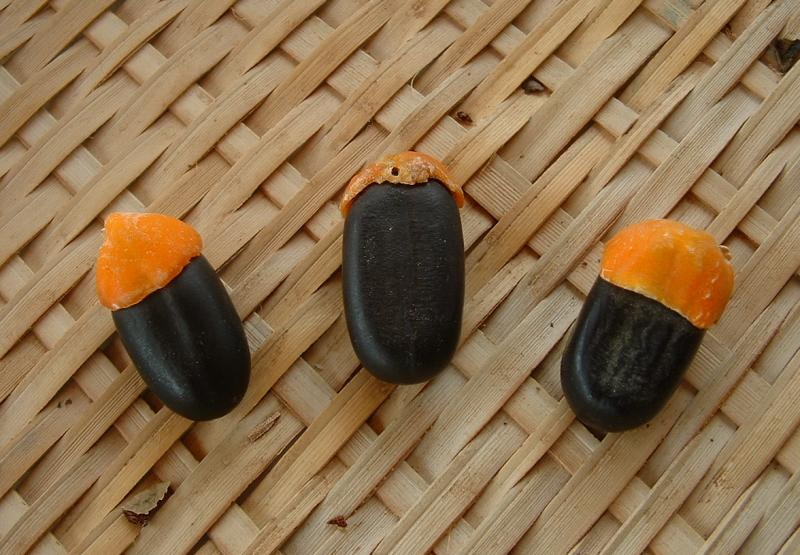
Afzelia africana seeds bearing orange elaiosomes

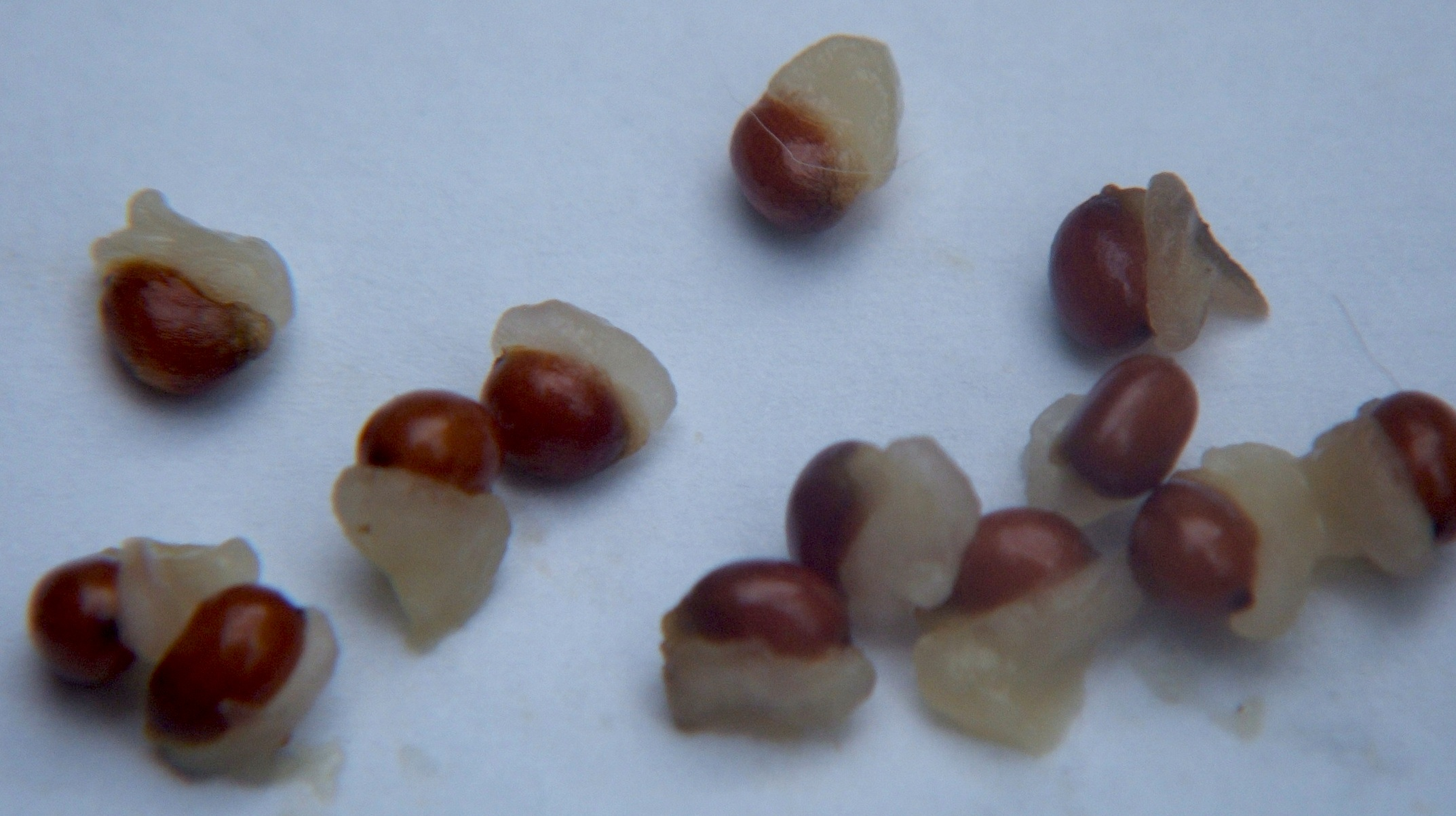
Trillium recurvatum seeds

Elaiosomes (Ancient Greek: ἔλαιον élaion "oil" + σόμα sóma "body") are fleshy structures that are attached to the seeds of many plant species. The elaiosome is rich in lipids and proteins, and may be variously shaped. Many plants have elaiosomes that attract ants, which take the seed to their nest and feed the elaiosome to their larvae. After the larvae have consumed the elaiosome, the ants take the seed to their waste disposal area, which is rich in nutrients from the ant frass and dead bodies, where the seeds germinate. This type of seed dispersal is termed myrmecochory from the Greek "ant" (myrmex) and "circular dance" (khoreíā). This type of symbiotic relationship appears to be mutualistic, more specifically dispersive mutualism according to Ricklefs, R.E. (2001), as the plant benefits because its seeds are dispersed to favorable germination sites, and also because it is planted (carried underground) by the ants.

Elaiosomes develop in various ways either from seed tissues (chalaza, funiculus, hilum, raphe-antiraphe) or from fruit tissues (exocarp, receptacle, flower tube, perigonium, style or spicule). The various origins and developmental pathways apparently all serve the same main function, i.e. attracting ants. Because elaiosomes are present in at least 11,000, but possibly up to 23,000 species of plants, elaiosomes are a dramatic example of convergent evolution in flowering plants.

== Caruncle ==
Caruncle

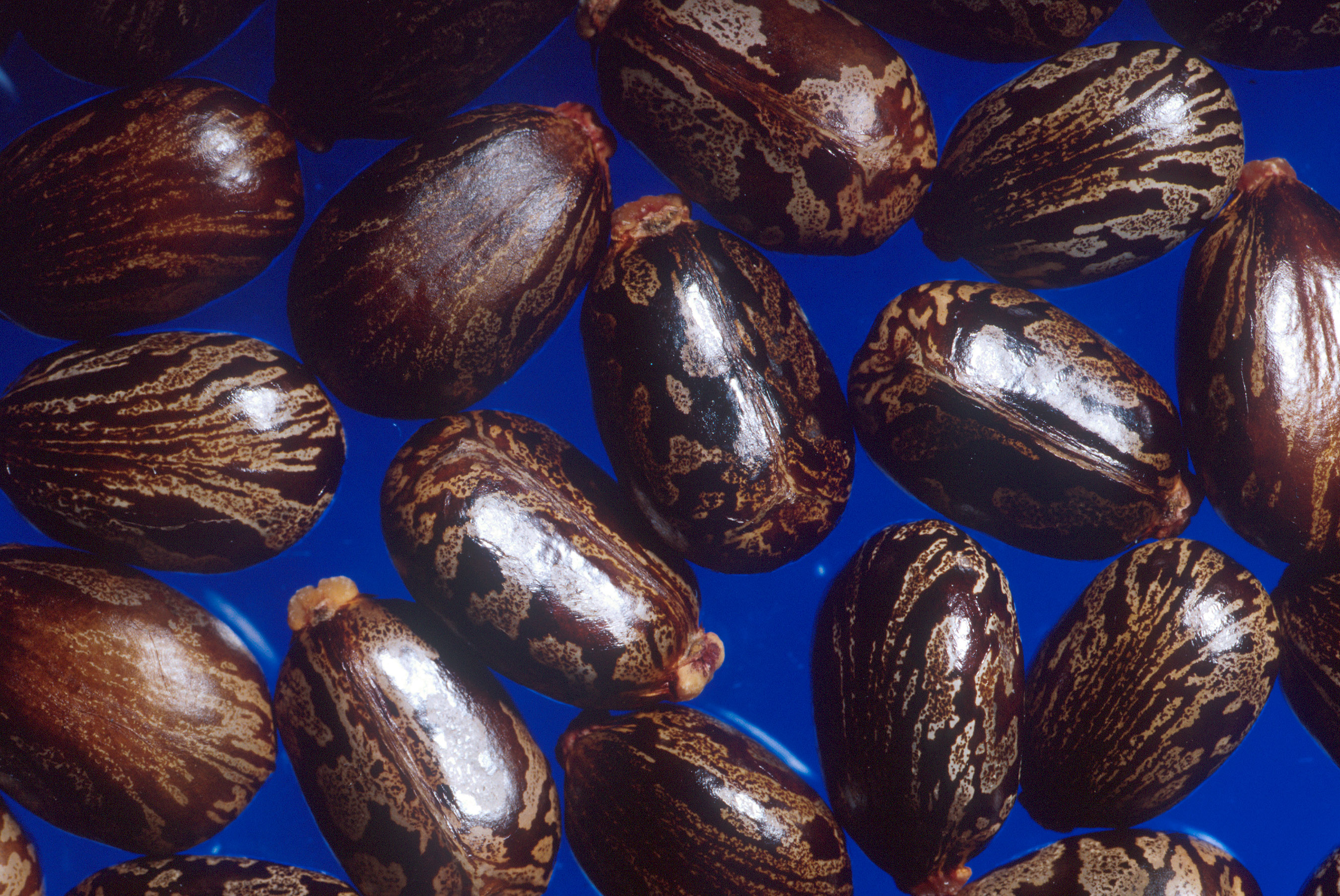
Carunculate seeds of Ricinus communis (Castor beans)

The particular elaiosome in the spurge family Euphorbiaceae is called caruncle (Latin caruncula "wart"). Seeds that have caruncles are carunculate; seeds that do not have caruncles are ecarunculate.

== List ==
A fully referenced current list of plants that have seeds with elaiosomes can be found in Lengyel et al. (2010).

- Chelidonium majus (greater celandine)
- Claytonia virginica
- Cnidoscolus urens
- Corydalis
- Dicentra (bleeding-heart, Dutchman's breeches)
- Hyacinthus (hyacinth)
- Myrtus (myrtle)
- Moehringia (sandworts)
- Ricinus communis (castor oil plant)
- Sanguinaria canadensis (Bloodroot)
- Trillium
- Viola (violet)

== See also ==
- Aril
- Capitulum, a similar appendage with similar purposes found in stick insect eggs.
- Myrmecochory
