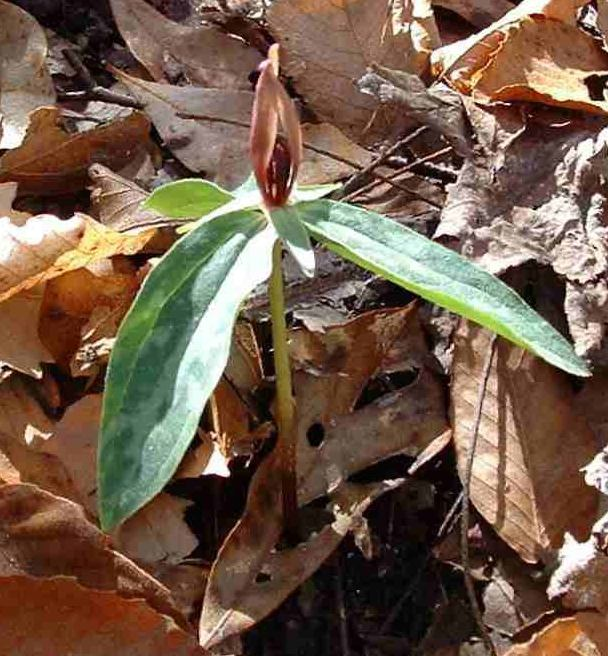
- Gadsden County, Florida

Conservation status
- Vulnerable (NatureServe)

- Endangered (IUCN 3.1)

Scientific classification
- Kingdom: Plantae
- Clade: Tracheophytes
- Clade: Angiosperms
- Clade: Monocots
- Order: Liliales
- Family: Melanthiaceae
- Genus: Trillium
- Species: T. lancifolium

Binomial name
- Trillium lancifolium Raf.

Synonyms
- T. lancifolium: Trillium lanceolatum Boykin ex S.Watson; Trillium recurvatum var. lanceolatum S.Watson; Trillium recurvatum subsp. lanceolatum (S.Watson) A.E.Murray; Trillium tennesseense E.E.Schill. & Floden

= Trillium lancifolium =

Species of flowering plant

Trillium lancifolium, the lanceleaf wakerobin, lance-leaved trillium, or narrow-leaved trillium, is a species of plants native to the southeastern United States. It is known to occur in Alabama, Florida, Georgia, Mississippi, South Carolina, and Tennessee. The species is imperiled in Alabama and Florida, and critically imperiled in South Carolina and Tennessee.

== Description ==
These plants are smaller than most other species in the genus, usually no more than 30 centimetres (12 in) tall, with comparatively inconspicuous flowers and leaves. As implied by both scientific and common names, the (lanceolate) leaves are notably narrow, about 2.5 times as long as they are broad, with the widest portion being more-or-less central. The petals are usually maroon or brownish-maroon, quite erect, and more slender than in most other species of Trillium.

== Taxonomy ==
Trillium lancifolium was first described and named by Constantine Samuel Rafinesque in 1840. As of March 2023, the name Trillium lancifolium Raf. is widely recognized. The species is a member of the sessile-flowered trilliums (Trillium subgen. Sessilia), a group of species typified by Trillium sessile.

== Distribution and habitat ==
Trillium lancifolium typically occurs in shady upland hardwood forests, but can be found in various other communities with some shade. Populations are usually scattered, and the individual plants are often present at low population levels.

== Ecology ==
Trillium lancifolium blooms from February to May.

== Bibliography ==
- Case, Frederick W. [in Spanish]; Case, Roberta B. (1997). Trilliums. Portland, Oregon: Timber Press. ISBN 978-0-88192-374-2.
- Lampley, Jayne A. (2021). A systematic and biogeographic study of Trillium (Melanthiaceae) (PhD). University of Tennessee.
- Lampley, Jayne A.; Gereau, Roy; Floden, Aaron; Schilling, Edward E. (2022-07-05). "A revised subgeneric classification of Trillium (Parideae, Melanthiaceae)". Phytotaxa. 552 (5): 278–286. Bibcode:2022Phytx.552..278L. doi:10.11646/phytotaxa.552.5.1. S2CID 250368253.
