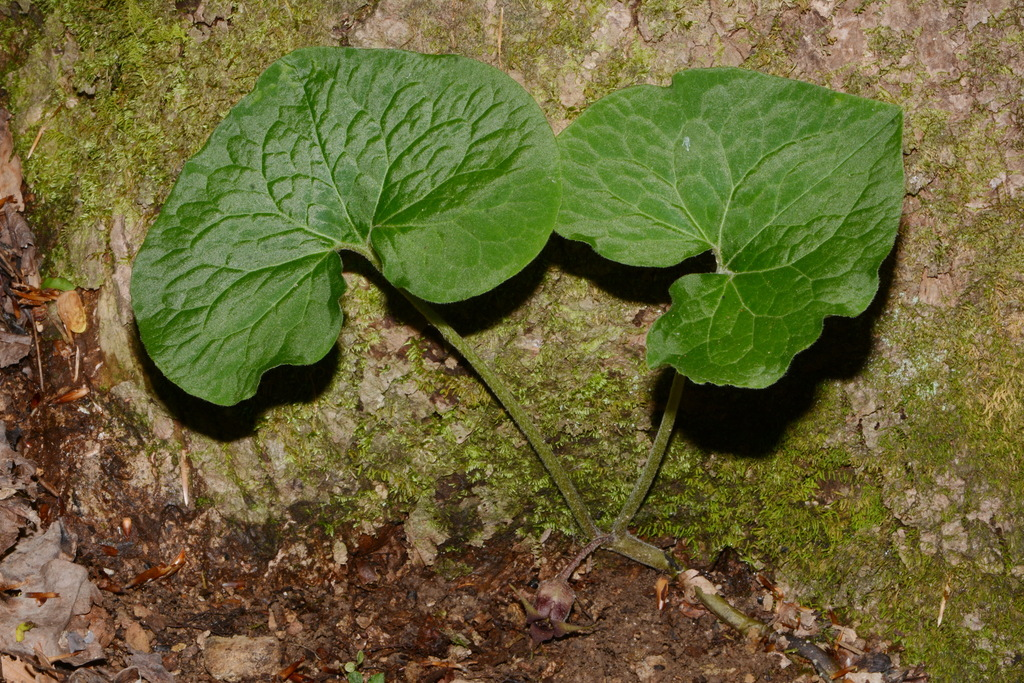
- Full-plant view of Asarum acuminatum
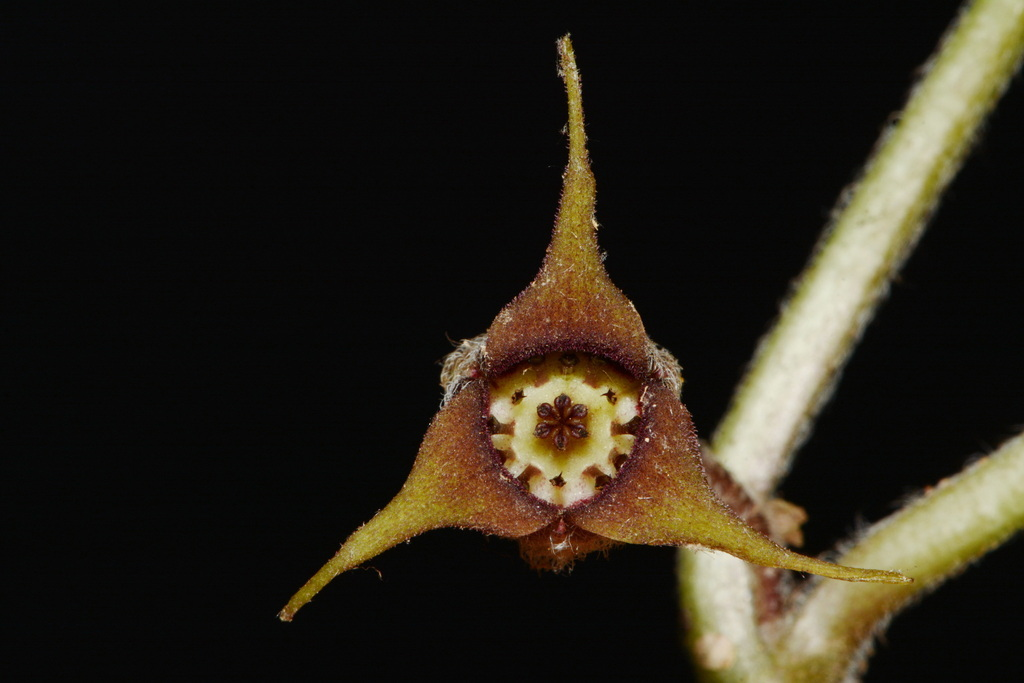
- Close-up view of flower

Scientific classification
- Kingdom: Plantae
- Clade: Tracheophytes
- Clade: Angiosperms
- Clade: Magnoliids
- Order: Piperales
- Family: Aristolochiaceae
- Genus: Asarum
- Species: A. acuminatum

Binomial name
- Asarum acuminatum (Ashe) E.P.Bicknell

Synonyms
- Homotypic synonyms: Asarum canadense var. acuminatum Ashe; Heterotypic synonyms: Asarum rubrocinctum Peattie

= Asarum acuminatum =

Species of flowering plant

Asarum acuminatum, also known as hydra ginger, is a species of flowering plant in the birthwort family Aristolochiaceae. It is native to the north-central and east-central regions of the United States where it occurs primarily in rich deciduous forests.

== Description ==
Asarum acuminatum is a long-lived perennial, herbaceous plant that persists by means of an underground rhizome. Its leaves are typically paired, broadly cordate, and arise directly from the rhizome. The flowers are solitary and borne at ground level. The calyx tube is approximately 10–20 mm long, with calyx lobes that are long-caudate (15–35 mm), initially erect to ascending at anthesis and becoming more spreading as the flower matures.

== Taxonomy ==
Asarum acuminatum was originally described as Asarum canadense var. acuminatum by William Willard Ashe in 1897. It was elevated to species rank by Eugene P. Bicknell in 1898. The epithet acuminatum, which means "with a long, narrow and pointed tip", refers to the tips of the calyx-lobes. Bicknell referred to the plant as the "long-tipped wild ginger".

In the 8th edition of Gray's Manual initially published in 1950, the American botanist Merritt Lyndon Fernald accepted the name Asarum canadense var. acuminatum Ashe. In 1997, the influential Flora of North America considered that name to be a synonym of Asarum canadense L. More recent treatments accept it as a distinct species. However, a 2025 master's thesis by Brett Lambert, using morphological and genome-wide SNP data, concluded that A. acuminatum substantially overlaps with A. canadense and is best treated as Asarum canadense var. acuminatum.

== Distribution and habitat ==
Asarum acuminatum is native to the central and eastern United States, including Alabama, Arkansas, Illinois, Indiana, Iowa, Kentucky, Michigan, Minnesota, Missouri, North Carolina, Tennessee, Virginia, and Wisconsin.

It occurs primarily in rich deciduous forests, often in mesic, shaded habitats with well-developed soils.

== Ecology ==
Like other species in the genus, Asarum acuminatum is a low-growing forest herb adapted to shaded environments. Flowering typically occurs from April to May. Its ground-level flowers are thought to be pollinated by small insects, and its seeds are likely dispersed by ants (myrmecochory), a common trait in the genus.

== Bibliography ==
- Britton, Nathaniel Lord; Brown, Addison (1898). An illustrated flora of the northern United States, Canada and the British possessions. Vol. III, Apocynaceae to Compositae, dogbane to thistle. New York: Charles Scribner's Sons.
- Fernald, Merrit Lyndon (1970) [first published in 1950]. Rollins, R. C. (ed.). Gray's Manual of Botany (8th ed.). D. Van Nostrand Company. ISBN 0-442-22250-5.
- Gledhill, David (2008). The Names of Plants (4th ed.). Cambridge University Press. ISBN 978-0-521-86645-3.
