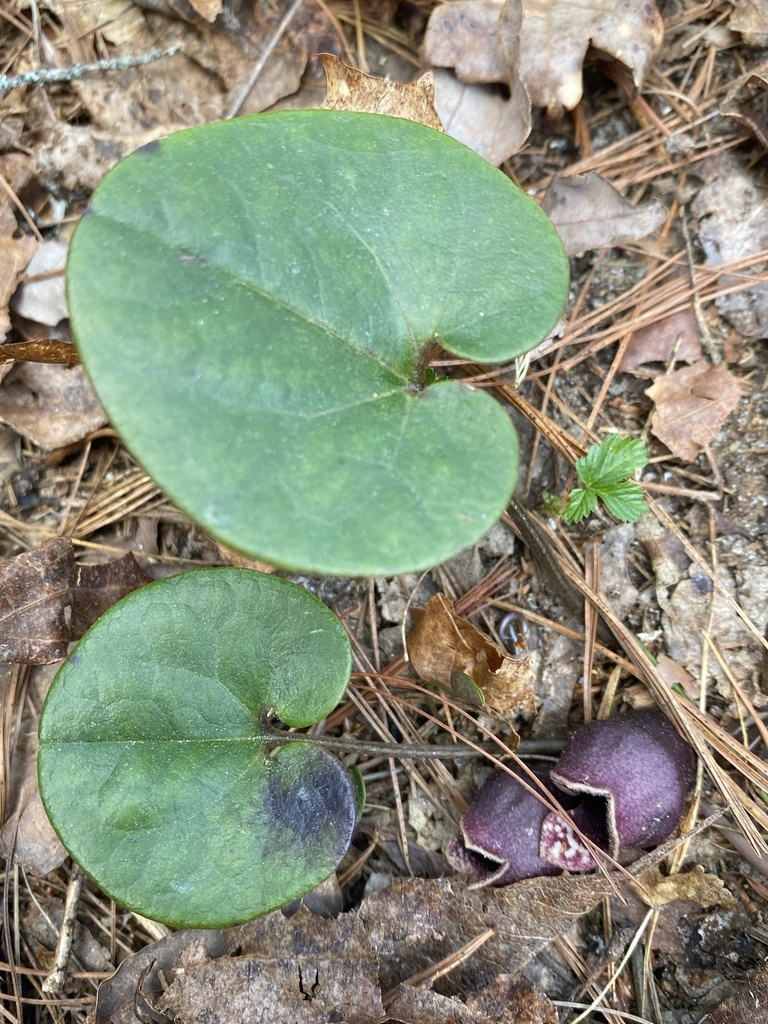
- Asarum rhombiformis in flower

Scientific classification
- Kingdom: Plantae
- Clade: Tracheophytes
- Clade: Angiosperms
- Clade: Magnoliids
- Order: Piperales
- Family: Aristolochiaceae
- Genus: Asarum
- Species: A. rhombiformis

Binomial name
- Asarum rhombiformis (Gaddy) Sinn

Synonyms
- Hexastylis rhombiformis Gaddy

= Asarum rhombiformis =

Species of flowering plant

Asarum rhombiformis, the North Fork heartleaf or French Broad heartleaf, is a wildflower of the family Aristolochiaceae found in North Carolina and South Carolina in the United States. The population of this species discovered in 1982 included about 50 plants. It has been postulated that, due to similarities between the three plants, Asarum rhombiformis may be a natural hybrid between Asarum arifolium and another local Asarum species.

== Description ==
Asarum rhombiformis is an evergreen herb with solitary flowers. Flower colors range from dark purple to white. The leaf blades are not variegated. The stigmas are round.

== Taxonomy ==
Asarum rhombiformis was originally described as Hexastylis rhombiformis, but transferred to the genus Asarum after a study of the internal transcribed spacer region (ITS) of nuclear ribosomal DNA concluded that the previously separate genera Hexastylis was found to be nested within the subgenus Heterotropa under the genus Asarum, though some recent publications still treat Hexastylis as a distinct genus.
