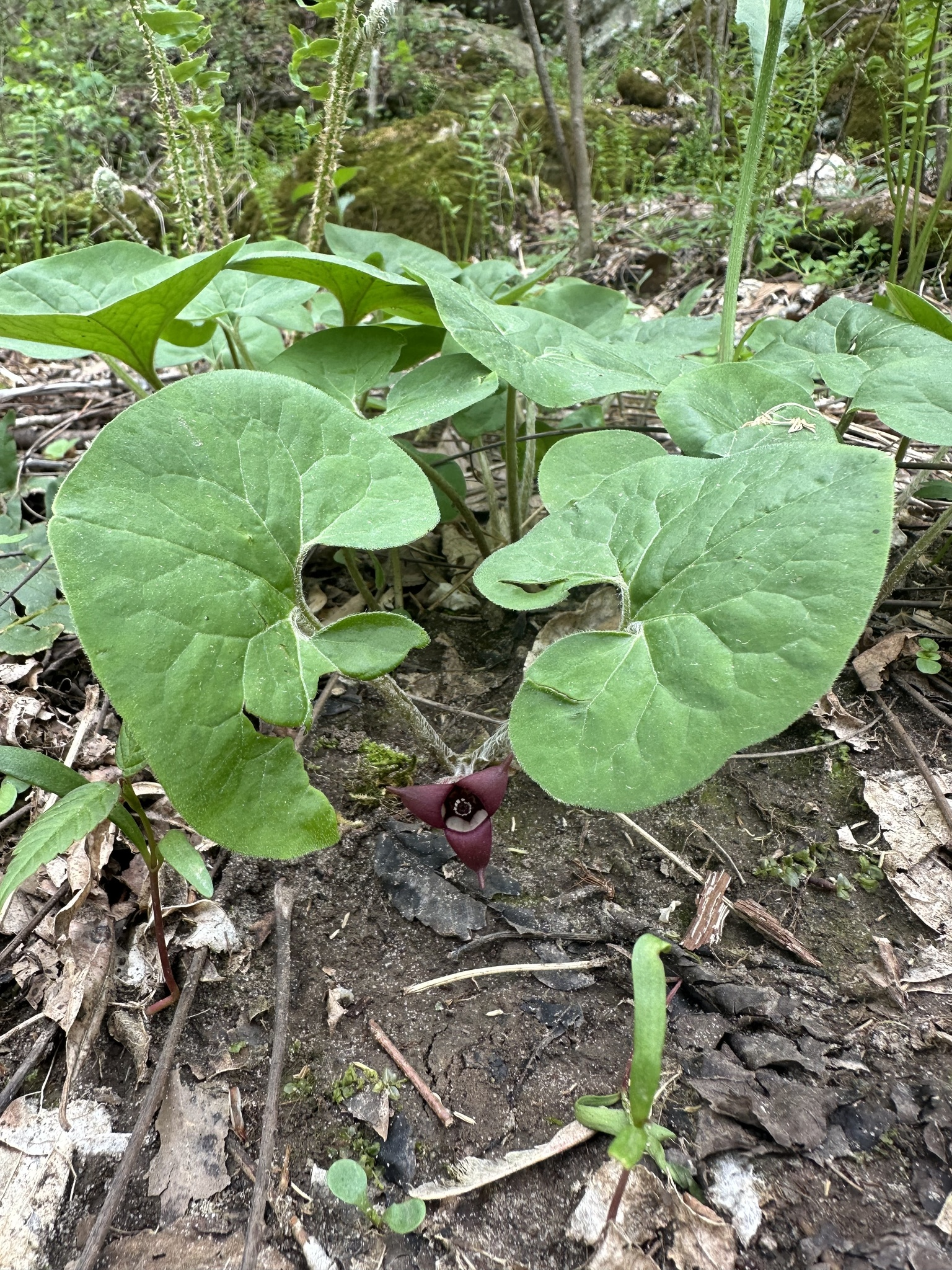
- Buffalo National River (Arkansas, US) in April

Scientific classification
- Kingdom: Plantae
- Clade: Tracheophytes
- Clade: Angiosperms
- Clade: Magnoliids
- Order: Piperales
- Family: Aristolochiaceae
- Genus: Asarum
- Species: A. reflexum

Binomial name
- Asarum reflexum E.P.Bicknell

Synonyms
- Homotypic synonyms: Asarum canadense var. reflexum (E.P.Bicknell) B.L.Rob.; Heterotypic synonyms: Asarum ambiguum (E.P.Bicknell) Daniels; Asarum canadense var. ambiguum (E.P.Bicknell) Farw.; Asarum reflexum var. ambiguum E.P.Bicknell

= Asarum reflexum =

Species of flowering plant

Asarum reflexum, also known as reflexed wild ginger, is a species of flowering plant in the birthwort family Aristolochiaceae. It is native to eastern North America where it is found primarily in rich deciduous forests. Its name refers to the reflexed sepals of the plant's flower, an important distinguishing character.

== Description ==
Asarum reflexum is a long-lived perennial, herbaceous plant that persists by means of an underground rhizome. The leaves are typically paired and basal (i.e., arising directly from the rhizome), each with a long petiole. The solitary flower is borne at ground level. The flower has three sepals that together form the calyx. The base of the calyx is fused to the flower head but the calyx lobes assume various positions depending on the flowering stage. Typically the lobes are strongly reflexed (i.e., bent back toward the base of the calyx), which is where the species gets its name.

== Taxonomy ==
Asarum reflexum was first described by the American botanist Eugene Pintard Bicknell in 1897. Bicknell collected its type specimen in Van Cortlandt Park in New York City. The epithet reflexum, which means "bent back upon itself", refers to its "characteristically reflected calyx-lobes". This is the primary difference between it and Asarum canadense.

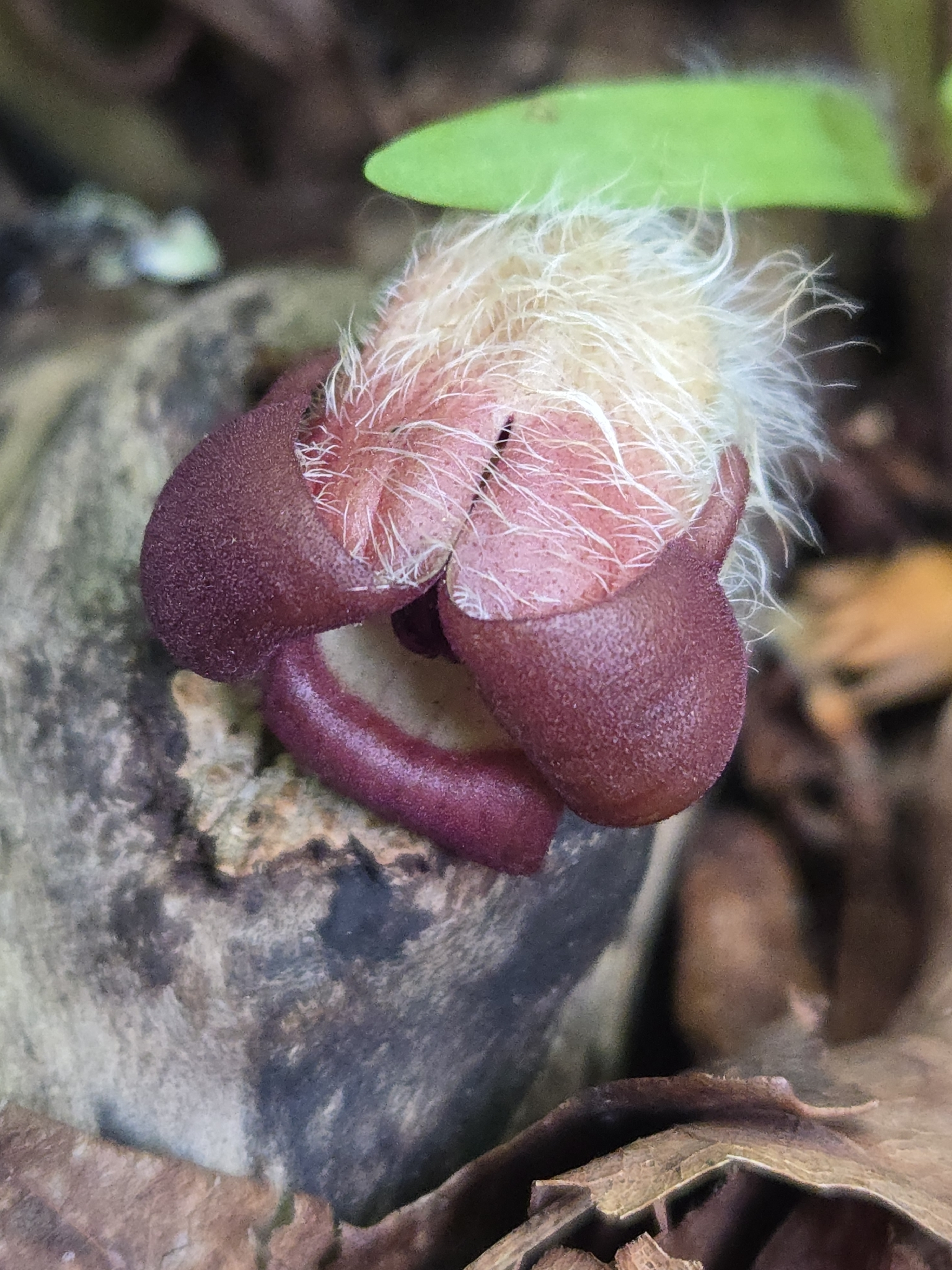
Flower with reflexed sepals in May

The American botanist Benjamin Lincoln Robinson reduced Asarum reflexum E.P.Bicknell to a variety in 1908 after failing to find a "constant distinction" between it and А. canadense. In the 8th edition of Gray's Manual initially published in 1950, the American botanist Merritt Lyndon Fernald accepted the name Asarum canadense var. reflexum (E.P.Bicknell) B.L.Rob. In 1997, the influential Flora of North America considered the latter to be a synonym of Аsarum canadense L. A master's thesis published in 2025 found morphological and genome-wide SNP data that supports Asarum reflexum as a distinct species. As of August 2026, there is growing acceptance of the name Asarum reflexum E.P.Bicknell.

== Distribution and habitat ==
Asarum reflexum is native to eastern North America. It ranges latitudinally from southeastern Ontario in Canada to the Gulf Coastal Plain of the southern United States (US), and longitudinally from the Interior Highlands of Missouri, Arkansas, and Oklahoma eastward to the coastal Atlantic Plain. In the eastern US, it is common in the Piedmont plateau regions of Georgia, South Carolina, North Carolina, Virginia, Maryland, Pennsylvania, and New Jersey. It is found primarily in rich deciduous forests.

== Ecology ==
Asarum reflexum is a spring-flowering species. In New York, for example, it typically flowers from the third week in April to the first week in May. When the flower finally falls, a new bud appears. By late summer that bud encloses fully-formed leaves and a flower that lies dormant under the leaf litter until the following spring.

== Bibliography ==
- Bicknell, Eugene P. (1897). "A new species of wild ginger hitherto confounded with Asarum canadense L.". Bulletin of the Torrey Botanical Club. 24 (11): 528–536. doi:10.2307/2478074. JSTOR 2478074.
- Fernald, Merrit Lyndon (1970) [first published in 1950]. Rollins, R. C. (ed.). Gray's Manual of Botany (8th ed.). D. Van Nostrand Company. ISBN 0-442-22250-5.
- Gledhill, David (2008). The Names of Plants (4th ed.). Cambridge University Press. ISBN 978-0-521-86645-3.
- Robinson, B. L. (1908). "Notes on the vascular plants of the northeastern United States". Rhodora. 10 (110): 29–35.
