= Little Brown Jug =

Little Brown Jug may refer to:

- "Little Brown Jug" (song), an 1869 song by Joseph Winner
- Little Brown Jug (college football trophy), an American award dating to 1892
- Little Brown Jug (horse racing), an American harness race for Standardbreds first run in 1946, or its namesake horse
- Little Brown Jug (actor) or Don Reynolds (1937–2019), American child performer
- Little Brown Jug (plant) or Hexastylis arifolia, a wildflower found in southeast United States
- Little Brown Jug, a 1941 painting by American Thomas Hart Benton

== See also ==
- Little Brown Jugette, a horse race in Delaware, USA
