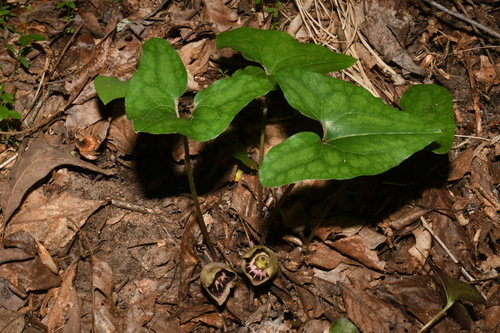
- Asarum finzelii in flower
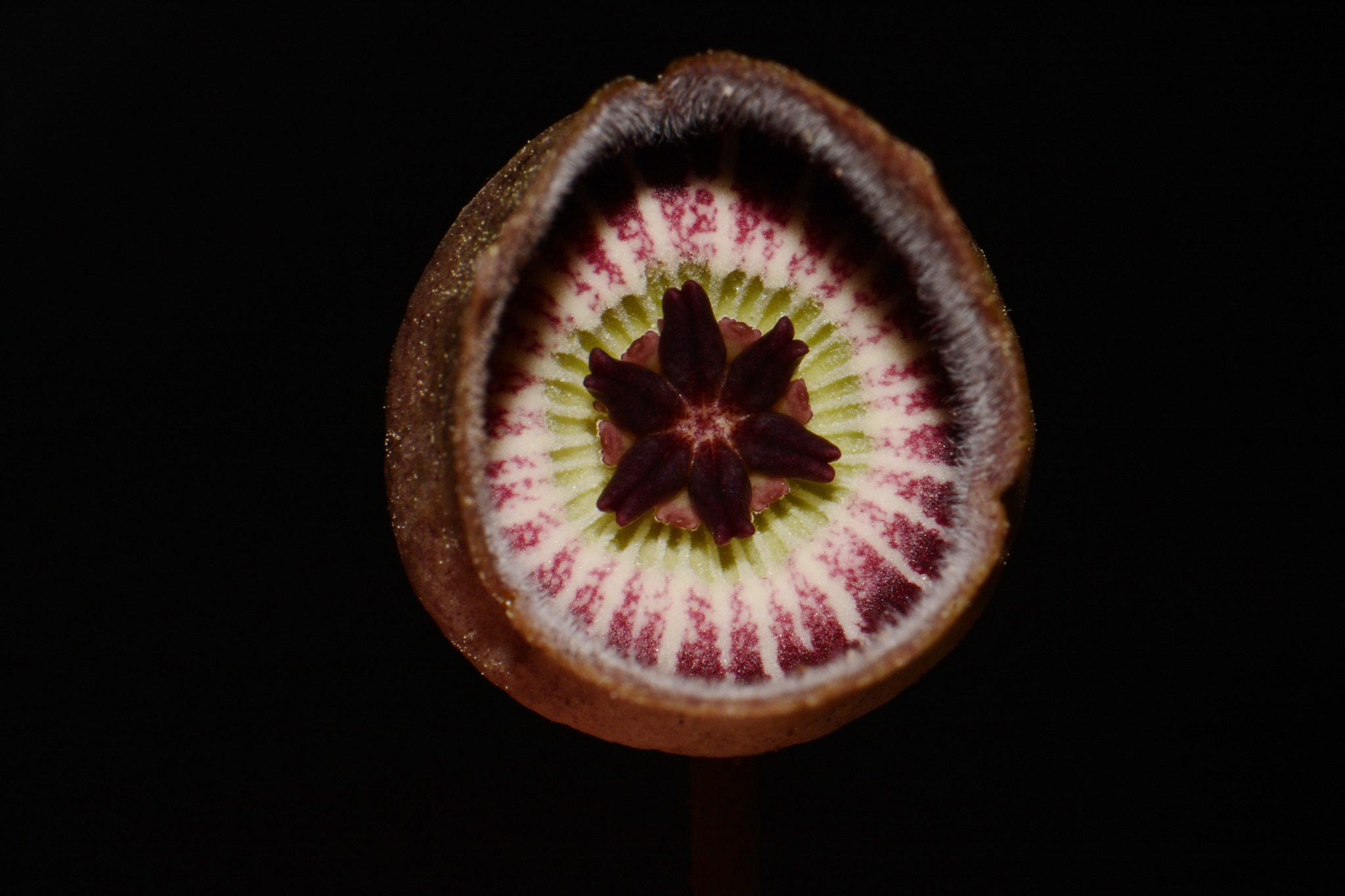
- Asarum finzelii front-view of flower

Conservation status
- Critically Imperiled (NatureServe)

Scientific classification
- Kingdom: Plantae
- Clade: Tracheophytes
- Clade: Angiosperms
- Clade: Magnoliids
- Order: Piperales
- Family: Aristolochiaceae
- Genus: Asarum
- Species: A. finzelii

Binomial name
- Asarum finzelii (B.R.Keener) Diamond

Synonyms
- Hexastylis finzelii B.R.Keener

= Asarum finzelii =

Species of wild ginger

Asarum finzelii, or Finzel's wild ginger, is a species of flowering plant in the family Aristolochiaceae. It is endemic to Marshall County, Alabama. It was formerly known as Hexastylis finzelii.

== Description ==
Asarum finzelii is a terrestrial, acaulescent perennial herb arising from a short rhizome. The leaf petioles are up to 23 cm long, and the blades are hastate-sagittate with rounded basal lobes, though sometimes triangular or nearly cordate; the largest leaves are 8–12(15) cm long and 8–10(12) cm wide.

The flowers are borne on peduncles 2–5 cm long. The calyx is 25–30 mm long and 16–19 mm wide, rounded at the base, and divided into two parts by an abrupt outward flare. The lower calyx tube is campanulate and 4–7 mm long, while the upper tube is more or less cup-shaped or short-cylindric and 10–11 mm long. The three calyx lobes are erect, broadly triangular, wider than long, and 8–12 mm long by 15–16 mm wide.

The flowers are similar to those of A. speciosum and A. arifolium, but differ from A. speciosum in having erect rather than recurved calyx lobes, a distinctly shorter lower calyx tube, and maroon rather than greenish style appendages; they differ from A. arifolium in having an open, cup-shaped calyx rather than an urceolate one.

Hexastylis finzelii is visually similar to H. speciosa and H. arifolia, with the shape of the flowers being the only defining feature. The flowers are difficult to see as they bloom beneath the leaf litter, which is thought to explain why the species went undiscovered for so long. It is hypothesized that they are pollinated by beetles.

== Distribution and habitat ==
Asarum finzelii is known only from two populations on Bishop Mountain in Marshall County, Alabama. The type locality is along the north side of the Tennessee River, west of Hambrick Hollow, northwest of Guntersville. There are thought to only be around 1,000 individuals in the wild.

The species occurs in the Plateau Escarpment portion of the southwestern Appalachians, near the boundary of the Pennington Formation and Bangor Limestone, including Bishop Mountain, with occasional Pottsville Sandstone debris. Its habitat is slightly mesic, with rocky, well-drained soil in regenerated forest several decades old. The canopy is composed mostly of hardwoods, including oaks, hickories, sweetgum, and tulip poplar, with occasional cedar and pine.

It is found growing out of leaf litter in moist, hardwood forests. Soils are rocky and well-draining. The populations are protected as they exist on federal Tennessee Valley Authority lands.

== Taxonomy ==
The species was first described as Hexastylis finzelii by Brian R. Keener in 2020. In 2023, Alvin R. Diamond transferred it to Asarum as Asarum finzelii.

The transfer reflects a broader taxonomic treatment in which Hexastylis is included within a more broadly circumscribed Asarum, based on morphological and molecular evidence indicating that Hexastylis is not monophyletic.

Asarum finzelii belongs to the informal arifolia–speciosa group, whose members are characterized by leaves mottled with lighter green between the primary veins and style extensions bifid to the stigmas.

== Etymology ==
The specific epithet honors Brian Finzel, a photographer who discovered the species in 2019. It was formally described by botanist Brian Keener in 2020. Keener proposed the common name "Finzel's wild ginger".

== Conservation status ==
The species has not been evaluated by the International Union for Conservation of Nature (IUCN). In its original description, Keener recommended that it be considered Endangered under IUCN criteria because of its extremely narrow distribution.
