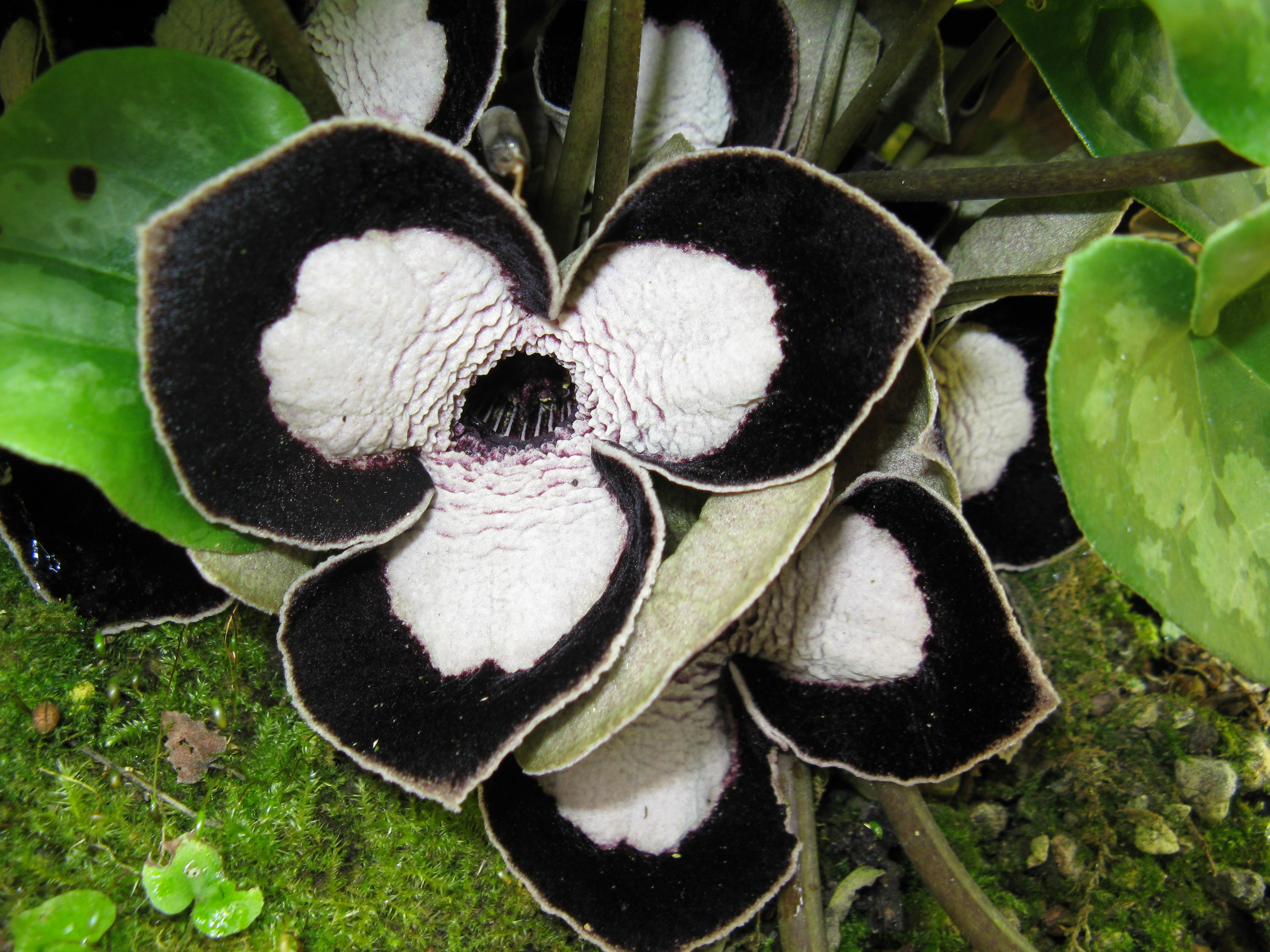

Conservation status
- Vulnerable (IUCN 3.1)

Scientific classification
- Kingdom: Plantae
- Clade: Tracheophytes
- Clade: Angiosperms
- Clade: Magnoliids
- Order: Piperales
- Family: Aristolochiaceae
- Genus: Asarum
- Species: A. maximum

Binomial name
- Asarum maximum Hemsl.

Synonyms
- Heterotropa maxima (Hemsl.) F.Maek.

= Asarum maximum =

Species of plant

Asarum maximum is a species of plant in the family Aristolochiaceae. It is endemic to China. The flowers have a distinct smell of mushrooms.
