= Asarum sorriei =

Conservation status
- Critically Imperiled (NatureServe)

Scientific classification
- Kingdom: Plantae
- Clade: Tracheophytes
- Clade: Angiosperms
- Clade: Magnoliids
- Order: Piperales
- Family: Aristolochiaceae
- Genus: Asarum
- Species: A. sorriei

Binomial name
- Asarum sorriei Gaddy

Species of flowering plant

Asarum sorriei, also known as Sorrie's heartleaf or sandhill heartleaf, is a species of flowering plant in the family Aristolochiaceae. The species was first described by L. L. Gaddy in September 2011.

== Range ==
Asarum sorriei can generally said to be rare and local. Fort Bragg and Camp Mackall in North Carolina, where annual burning is widespread, are the only locations where the Sandhills Heartleaf can said to be common.

== Etymology ==
Asarum sorriei was named after the botanist Bruce Alexander Sorrie.
