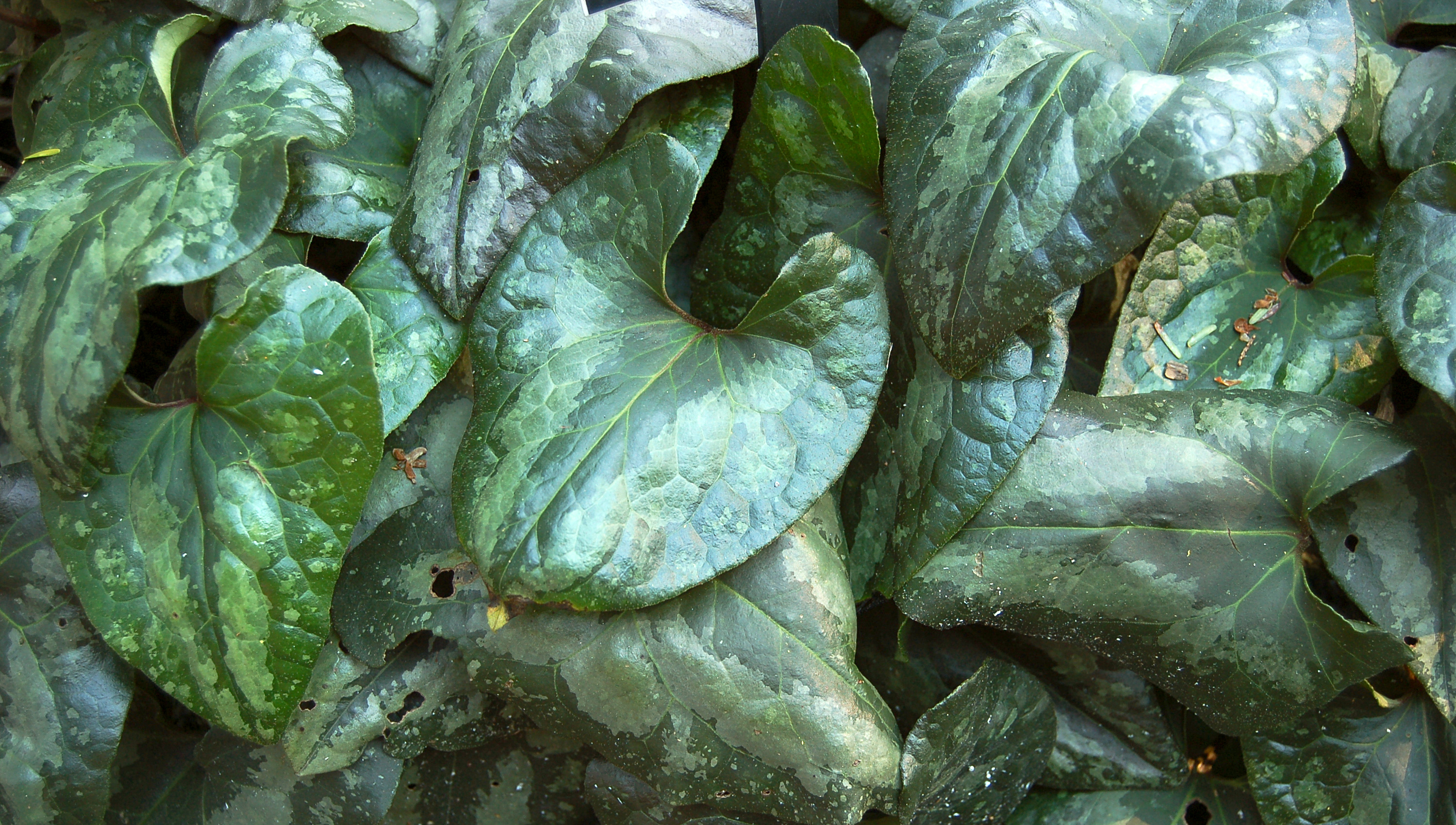

Scientific classification
- Kingdom: Plantae
- Clade: Embryophytes
- Clade: Tracheophytes
- Clade: Angiosperms
- Clade: Magnoliids
- Order: Piperales
- Family: Aristolochiaceae
- Genus: Asarum
- Species: A. splendens

Binomial name
- Asarum splendens (F.Maek.) C.Y.Chen & C.S.Yang

Synonyms
- Asarum chingchengense C.Y.Cheng & C.S.Yang.; Heterotropa splendens F.Maek.

= Asarum splendens =

Chinese wild ginger

Species of flowering plant

Asarum splendens, commonly known Chinese wild ginger or showy Sichuan ginger, is a species of wild ginger native to South Central China

== Images ==
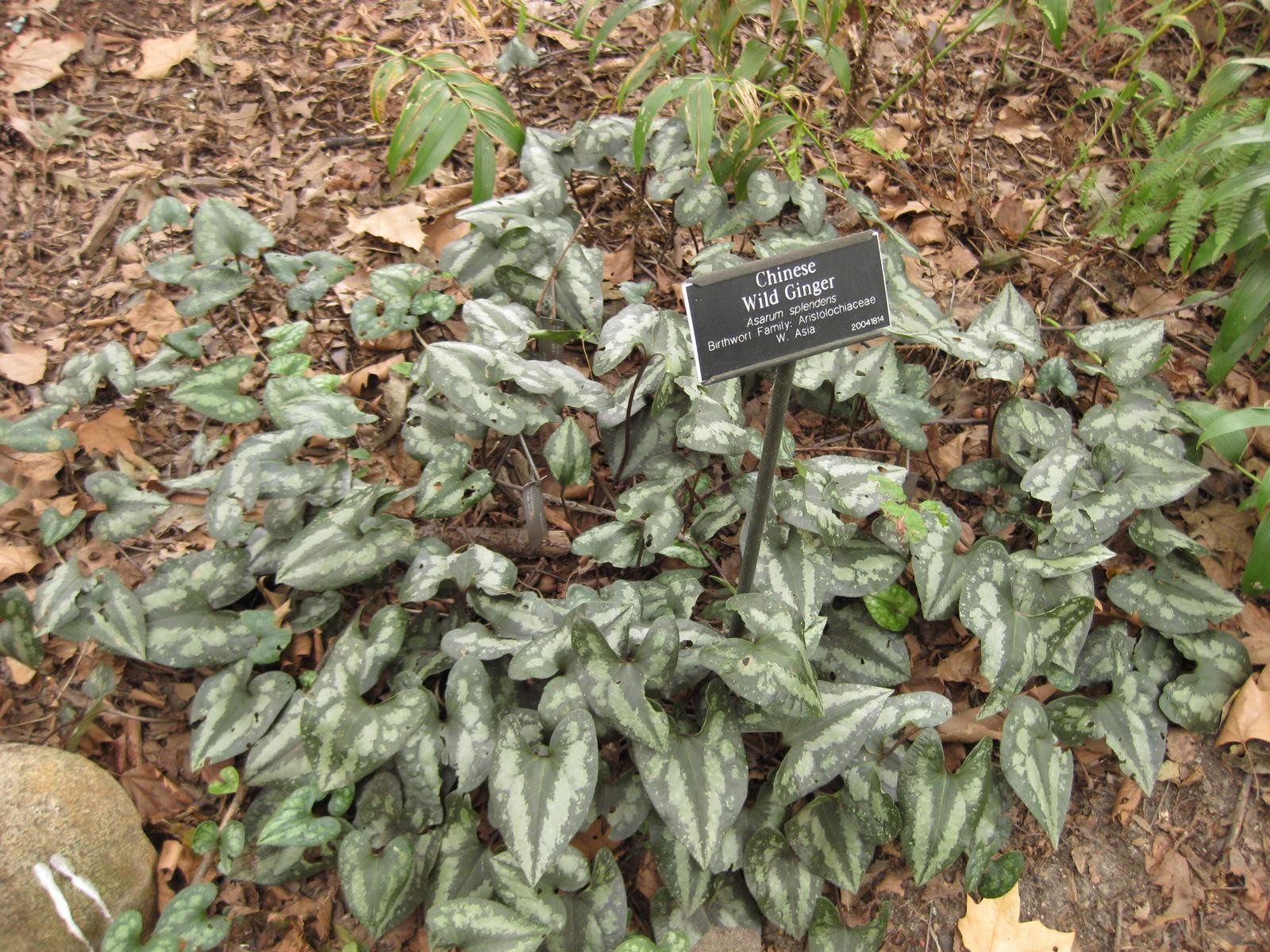
Leaves

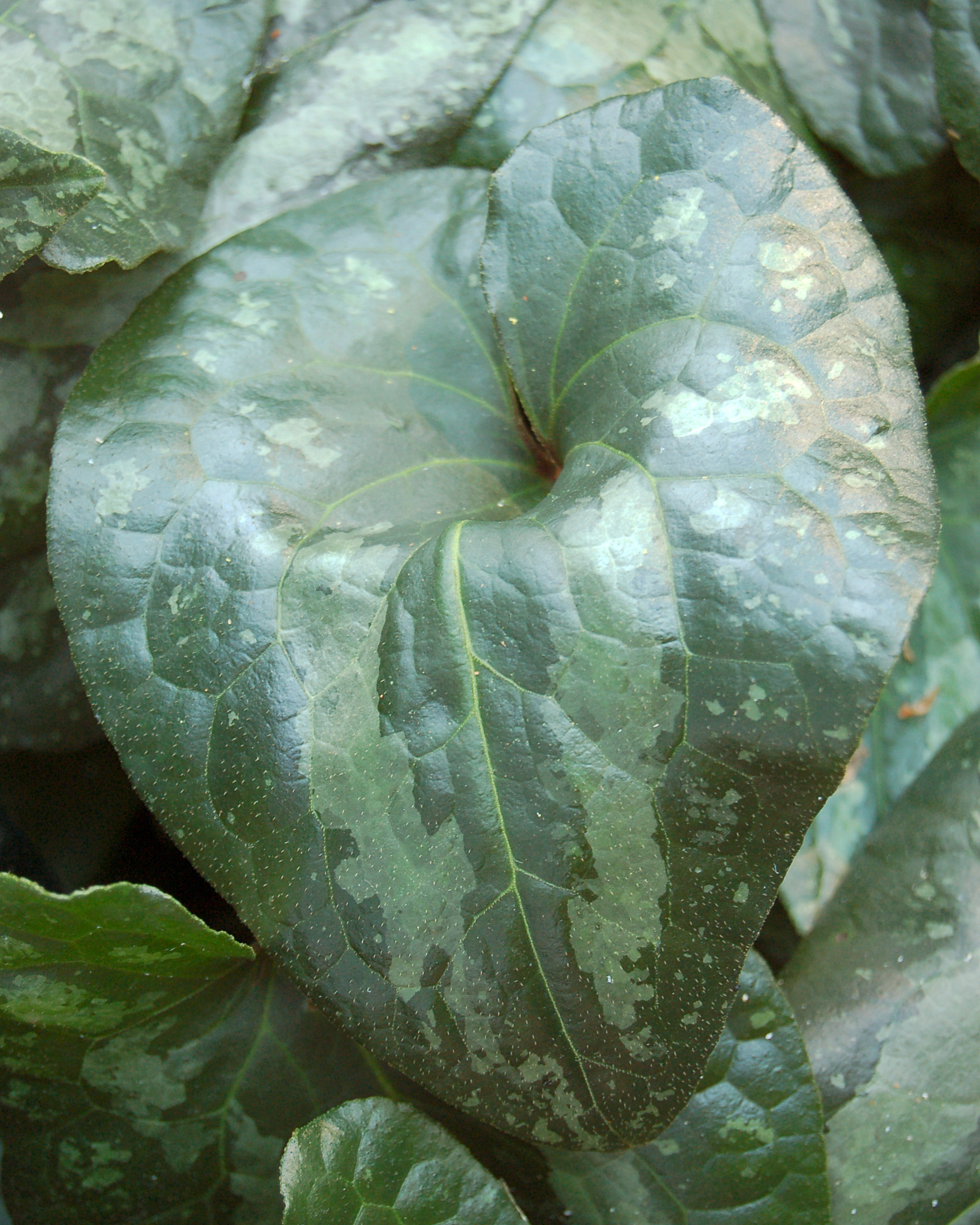
Leaves close up
