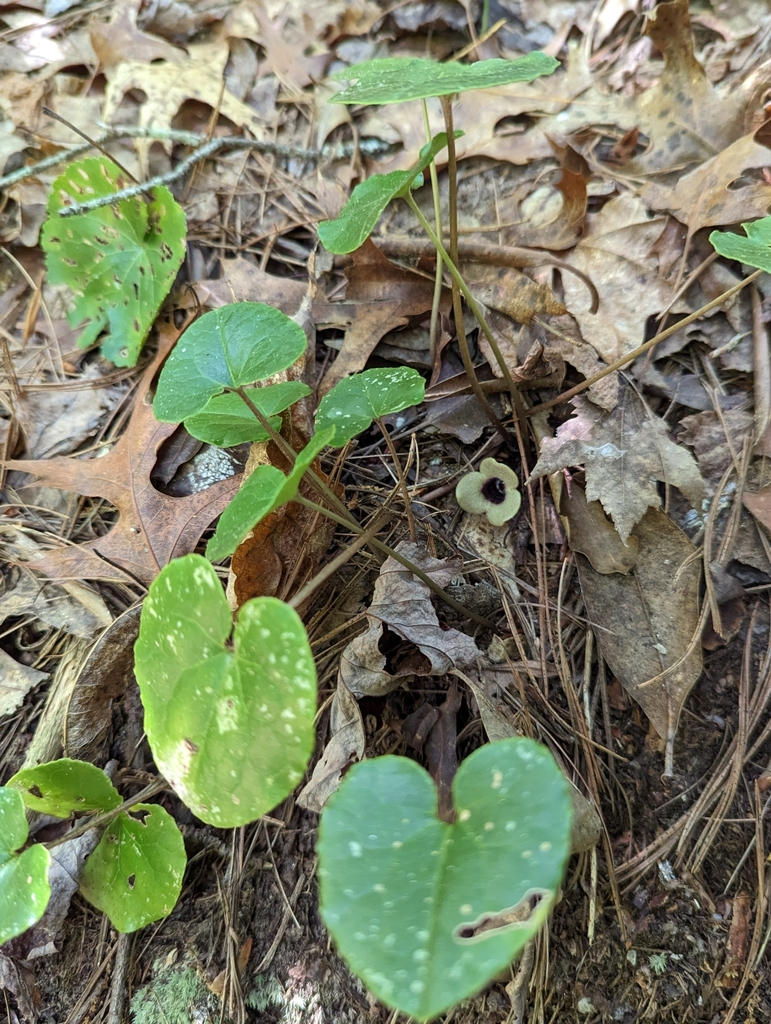

Conservation status
- Critically Imperiled (NatureServe)

Scientific classification
- Kingdom: Plantae
- Clade: Tracheophytes
- Clade: Angiosperms
- Clade: Magnoliids
- Order: Piperales
- Family: Aristolochiaceae
- Genus: Asarum
- Species: A. rosei

Binomial name
- Asarum rosei Sinn

= Asarum rosei =

Species of flowering plant

Asarum rosei is a species of flowering plant endemic to North Carolina in the southeastern United States. It was first formally described in 2017 by Brandon T. Sinn in Phytotaxa. The species is named for Mark Rose, "a respected plant collector, horticulturalist, orchid breeder, and naturalist who discovered and documented the species".

Leaves of Asarum rosei	Asarum rosei front-view of flower	Asarum rosei side-view of flower
Photographs by Eleanor Harris. Released under CC0 1.0.
