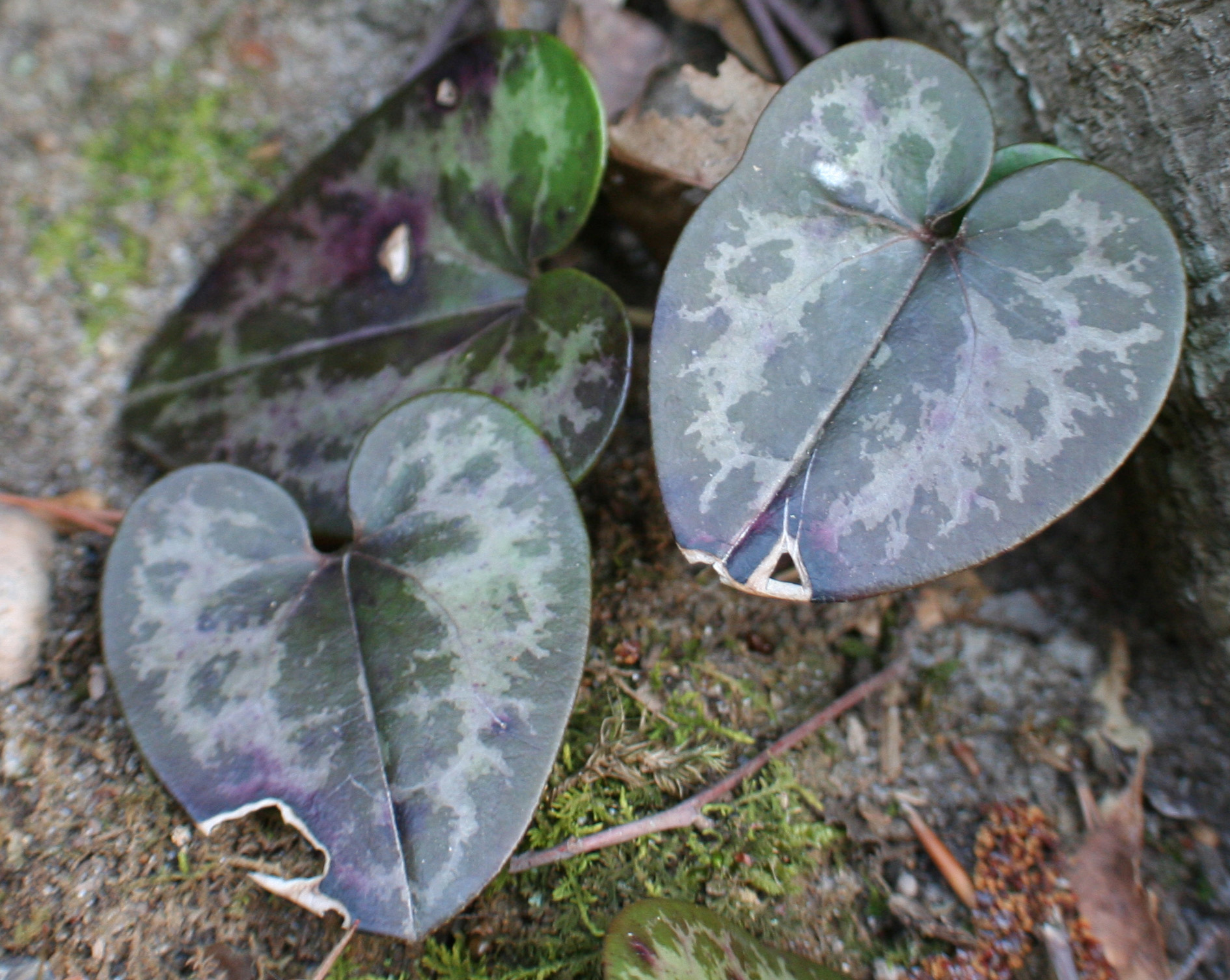
- Leaves in early spring in southeastern Virginia

Conservation status
- Apparently Secure (NatureServe)

Scientific classification
- Kingdom: Plantae
- Clade: Tracheophytes
- Clade: Angiosperms
- Clade: Magnoliids
- Order: Piperales
- Family: Aristolochiaceae
- Genus: Asarum
- Species: A. virginicum

Binomial name
- Asarum virginicum (L.) Small.

Synonyms
- Heterotropa virginica (L.) A.Gray (1841); Hexastylis virginica (L.) Small (1901) Asarum grandiflorum Klotzsch (1859); Asarum macanthum Small (1894) Asarum maculosum Stokes (1812); Asarum memmingeri Ashe (1897) Asarum virginianum Crantz (1766); Hexastylis memmingeri Small (1901)

= Asarum virginicum =

Species of flowering plant

Asarum virginicum, commonly known as Virginia heartleaf, is a prostrate perennial plant in the Aristolochiaceae (birthwort family). It is found in the mideastern United States from Maryland and Virginia in the north, south to North Carolina and Tennessee. The plant is encountered in deciduous and mixed forests. Its flowers emerge in early spring from April through June.
