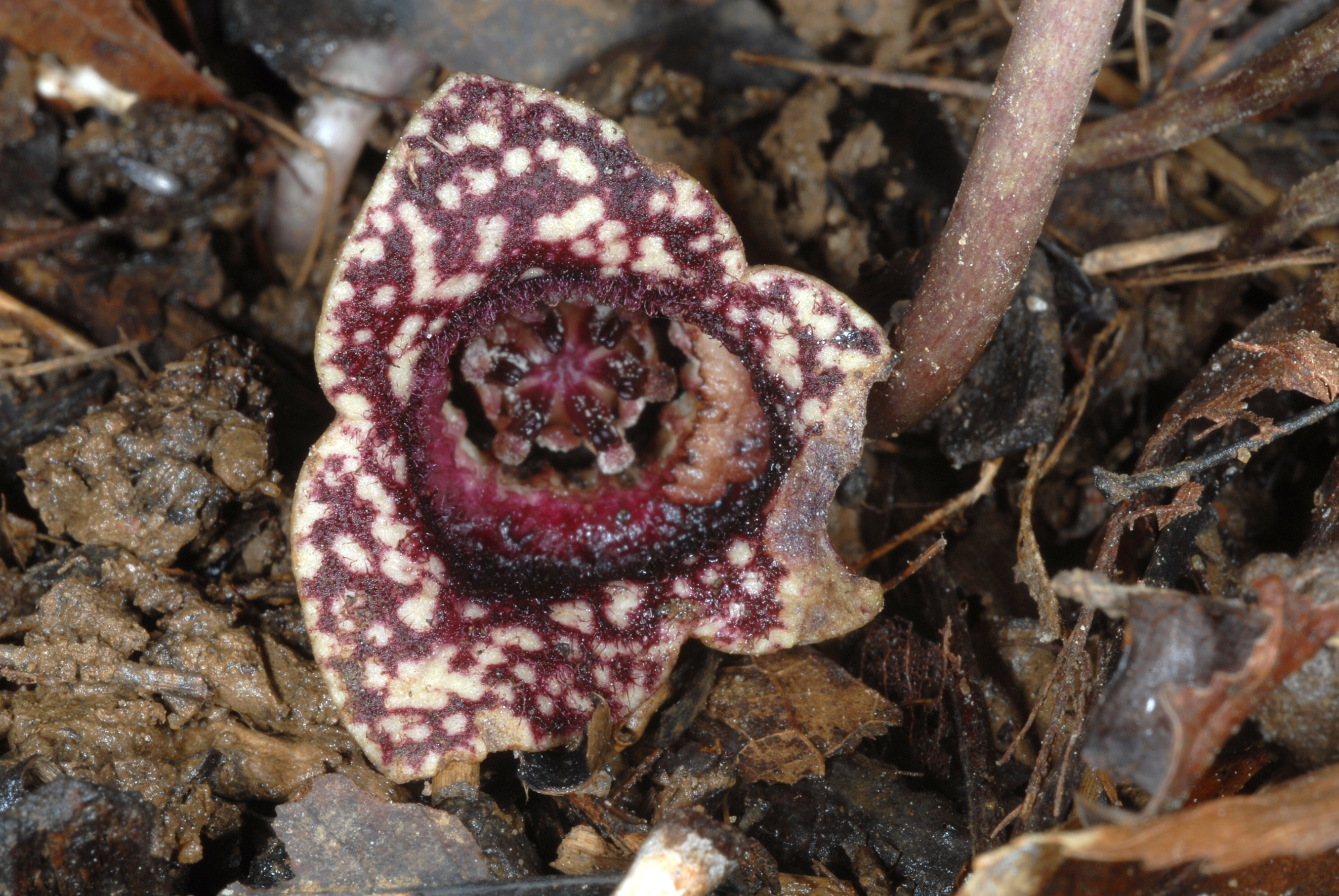
- Asarum minus flowers

Scientific classification
- Kingdom: Plantae
- Clade: Tracheophytes
- Clade: Angiosperms
- Clade: Magnoliids
- Order: Piperales
- Family: Aristolochiaceae
- Genus: Asarum
- Species: A. minus

Binomial name
- Asarum minus Ashe

= Asarum minus =

Species of plant

Asarum minus, the little heartleaf or little brown jug, is a species of flowering plant in the Aristolochiaceae family. It is native to the southeast United States.

== Description ==
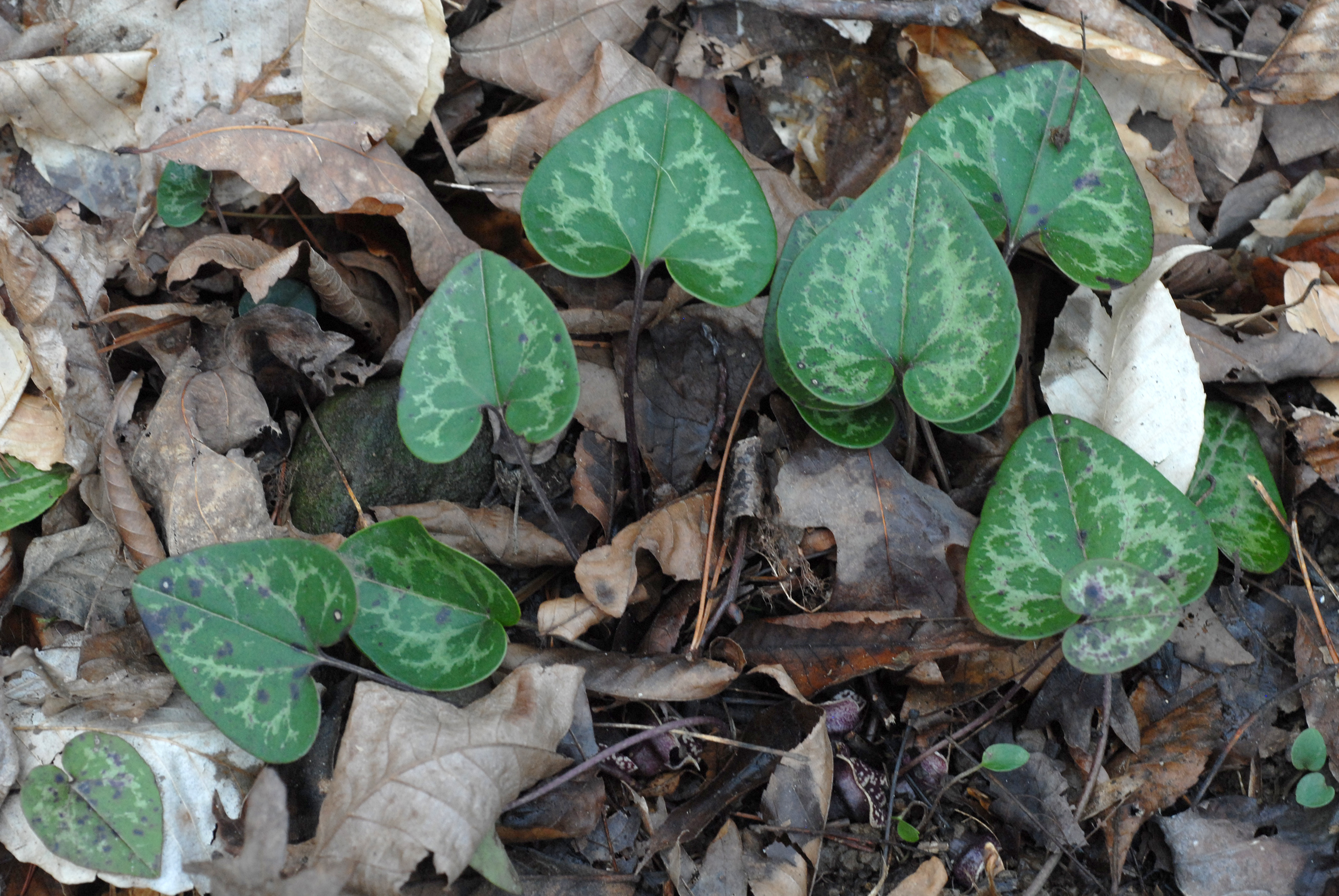
Heart-shaped, variegated leaves of Asarum minus

Asarum minus is a low-growing, stemless perennial. Its leaves and flowers emerge from an underground rhizome. The leaves are long-petioled, heart- to kidney-shaped, 1.5-3 inches long, variegated, evergreen-leathery, and emit a spicy smell when torn. Maroon-brown flowers are situated on short stalks, about 1/2 in. long. Flowers are firm and fleshy and have a weak bell shape that flares out into three triangular, white-mottled lobes. Fruit is a round, fleshy capsule.

== Range ==
Asarum minus is endemic to the piedmont region, coastal plains, and mountains of Virginia, North Carolina, and South Carolina.

== Ecology ==
Flowers are often hidden under leaf litter.

== Taxonomy ==
Asarum minus was first described by William Ashe in 1897. A. minus is the basionym of Hexastylis minor (Ashe) H.L. Blomq.
