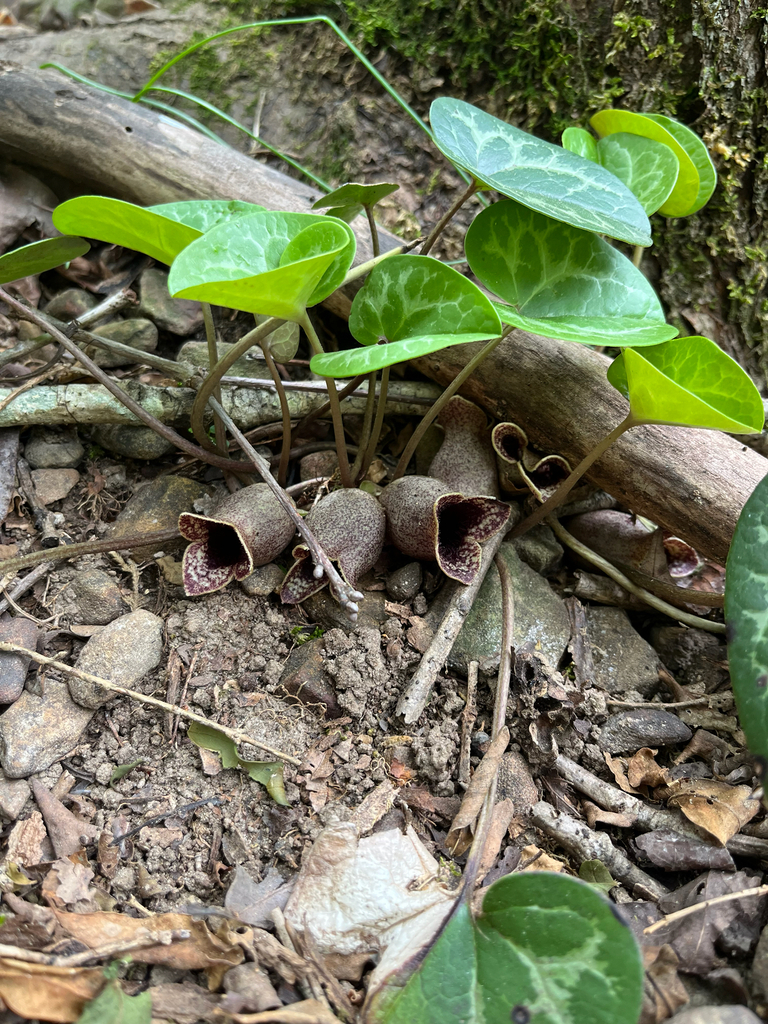
- Full-plant view of Asarum shuttleworthii with flowers found along Duck River in Cullman, Alabama.

Conservation status
- Apparently Secure (NatureServe)

Scientific classification
- Kingdom: Plantae
- Clade: Tracheophytes
- Clade: Angiosperms
- Clade: Magnoliids
- Order: Piperales
- Family: Aristolochiaceae
- Genus: Asarum
- Species: A. shuttleworthii

Binomial name
- Asarum shuttleworthii Britten & Baker f.

Synonyms
- Hexastylis shuttleworthii (Britten & Baker f.) Small; Asarum shuttleworthii var. shuttleworthii A.Gray; Hexastylis shuttleworthii var. shuttleworthii (Britten & Baker f.) Small

= Asarum shuttleworthii =

Species of flowering plant

Asarum shuttleworthii, commonly known as Shuttleworth's ginger or the largeflower heartleaf, is a perennial wildflower in the family Aristolochiaceae. It is native to the southeastern United States, primarily found in the Appalachian foothills of Alabama, Georgia, Tennessee, South Carolina, and North Carolina. It is notable for its large, urceolate (urn-shaped) flowers, which emerge under the leaves directly from the rhizome.

== Description ==
Asarum shuttleworthii is an evergreen, herbaceous plant found in the southeastern US. It has heart-shaped leaves which are variegated along the leaf veins, although northern populations rarely lack variegation. It spreads via thick, branching rhizomes beneath the forest floor. The flowers are solitary, emerging directly from the rhizomes. They are dark purple to brown in color, typically trilobed, and significantly larger than those of most related species. Blooming occurs in early spring.

== Taxonomy ==
Asarum shuttleworthii was first described by American botanist Asa Gray in 1844 in the Boston Journal of Natural History, named after Robert J. Shuttleworth, the English botanist who initially described the species as Homotropa macranthum in 1893. It was later transferred to the genus Hexastylis by John Kunkel Small, but modern phylogenetic studies support its placement within Asarum.

=== Synonymy ===
The name Asarum shuttleworthii has a complex taxonomic history, with multiple synonyms and varietal combinations recognized across different sources:

- Asarum grandiflorum (Michx. ex Duch.) Small (1894)
- Asarum shuttleworthii Britten & Baker f. — Basionym (1901)
- Hexastylis shuttleworthii (Britten & Baker f.) Small — Flora of North America (FNA3); NatureServe; Gaddy (1987a)
- Asarum shuttleworthii var. shuttleworthii — Barringer (1993); Sinn (2015)
- Hexastylis shuttleworthii var. shuttleworthii — FNA3; Keener & Davenport (2015)

The accepted name varies by database. Plants of the World Online (POWO) currently accepts Asarum shuttleworthii Britten & Baker f., following molecular phylogenetic studies (e.g., Kelly 1998) that support the inclusion of Hexastylis within Asarum.

Asarum harperi was previously classified as A. shuttleworthii var. harperi Gaddy (1987) before being classified as a separate species in 2016 by Alvin R. Diamond. A. harperi's flowers are nearly identical to A. shuttleworthii, but grows from a creeping rhizome in a distinct mat-like formation and is narrowly endemic to Alabama and Georgia.

== Conservation status ==
Asarum shuttleworthii is globally ranked as G4 – Apparently Secure by NatureServe, though it may be vulnerable locally due to habitat fragmentation and a relatively restricted range.

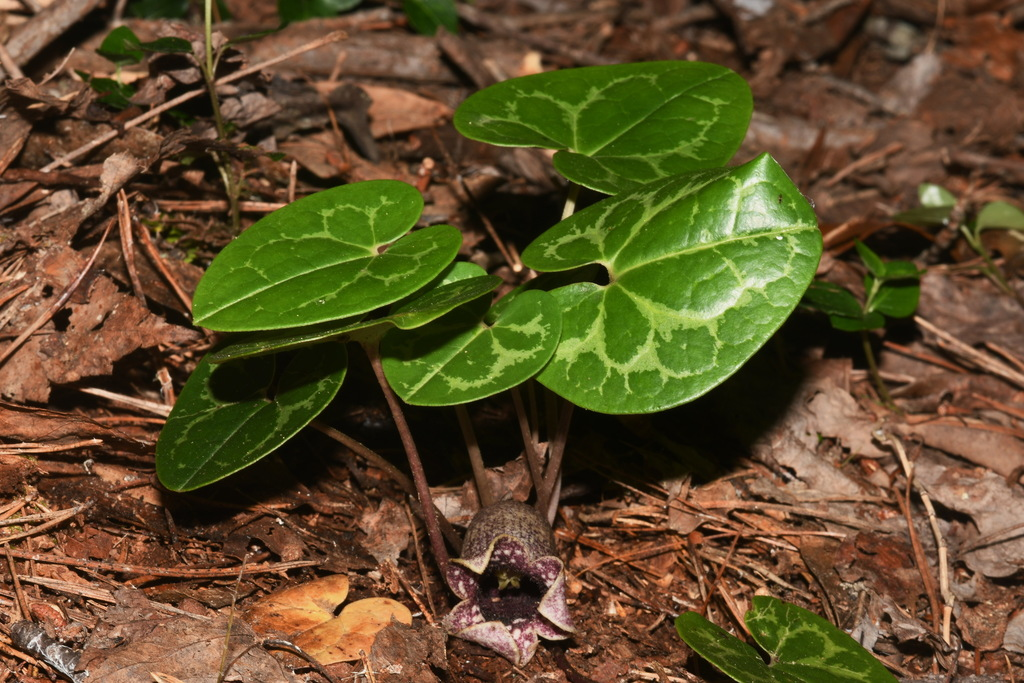
Full plant view showcasing variegation along the veins

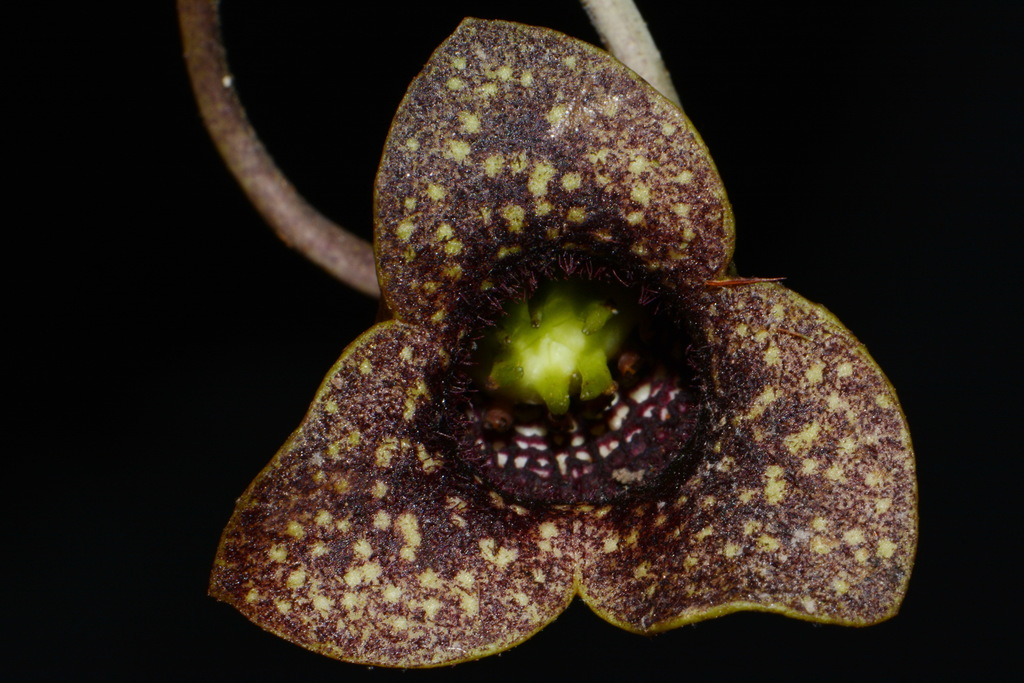
Frontal view of flower

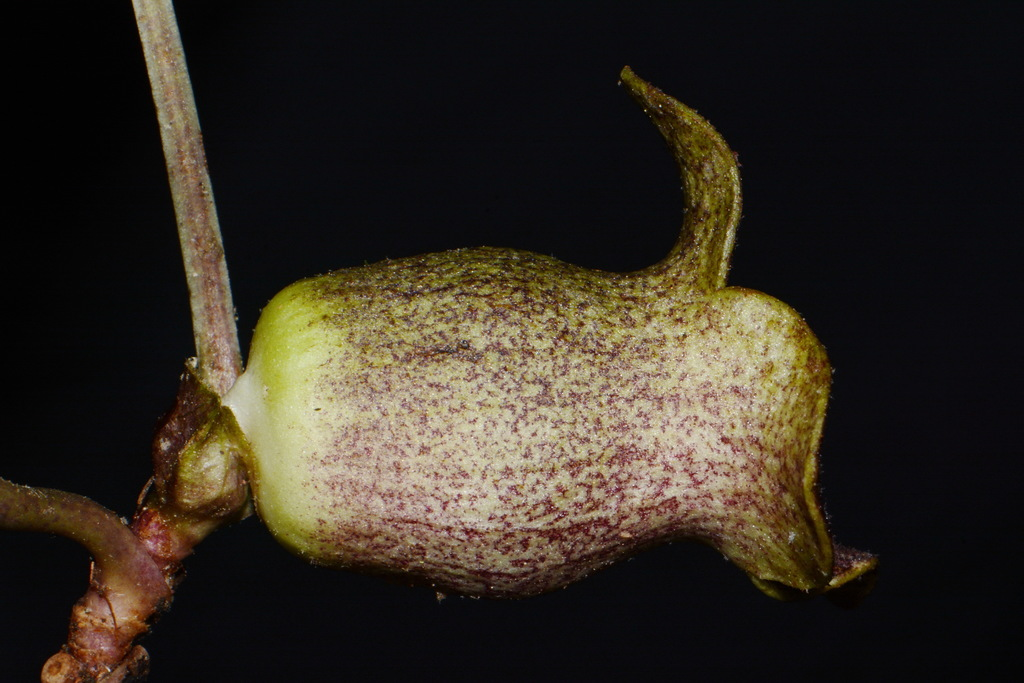
Side view of flower
