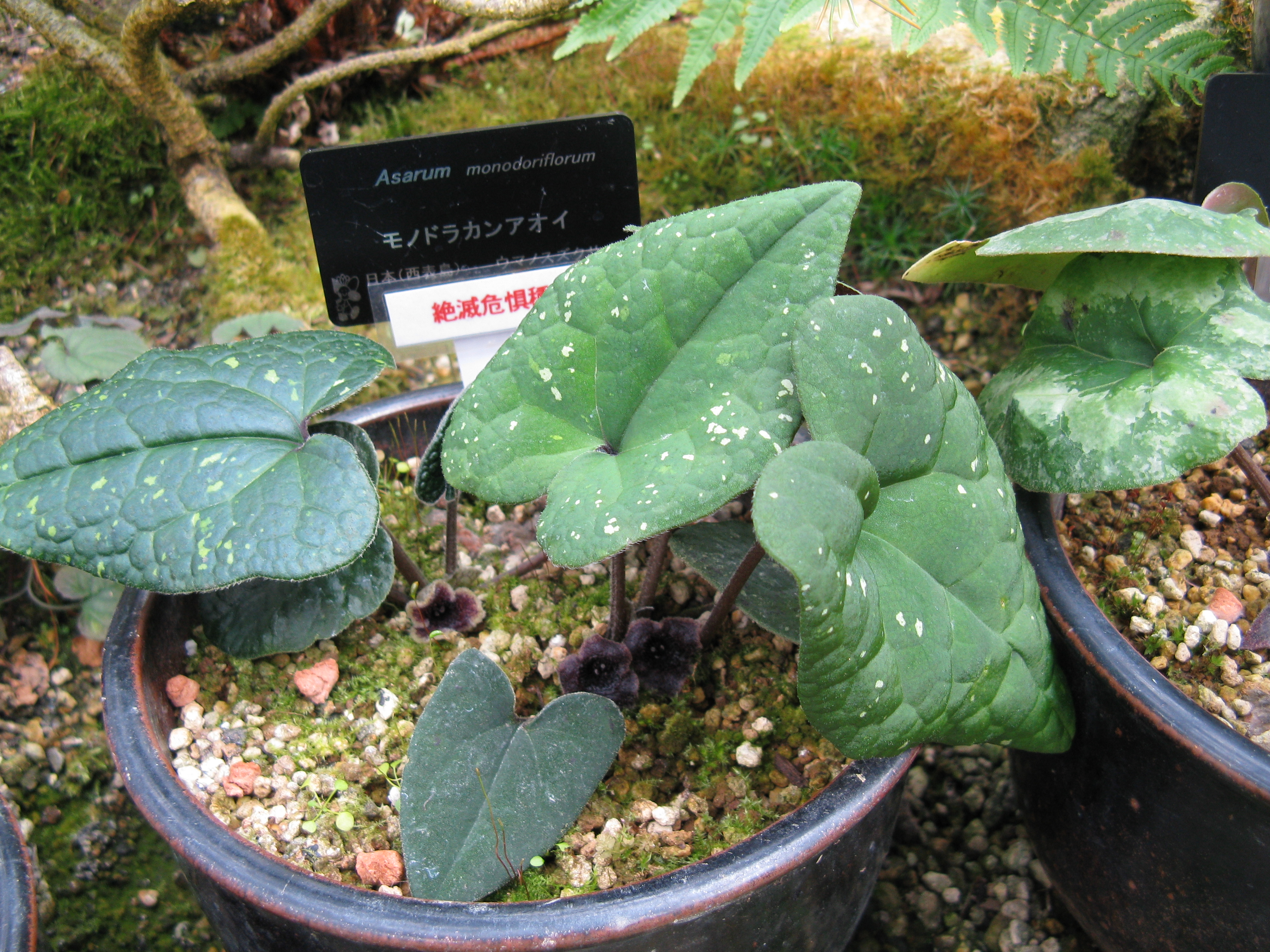

Conservation status
- Critically Endangered (IUCN 3.1)

Scientific classification
- Kingdom: Plantae
- Clade: Embryophytes
- Clade: Tracheophytes
- Clade: Spermatophytes
- Clade: Angiosperms
- Clade: Magnoliids
- Order: Piperales
- Family: Aristolochiaceae
- Genus: Asarum
- Species: A. monodoriflorum

Binomial name
- Asarum monodoriflorum Hatus. & Yamahata

= Asarum monodoriflorum =

Species of perennial plant

Asarum monodoriflorum, also known by the common name Monodora-kan-aoi, is a low-growing, herbaceous perennial plant. It is critically endangered.

== Distribution ==
It is endemic to the Ryukyu Islands of Japan.

== Taxonomy ==
It was described by Sumihiko Hatusima and Eiji Yamahata, and published in J. Phytogeogr. Taxon. 37: 72 in 1989.
