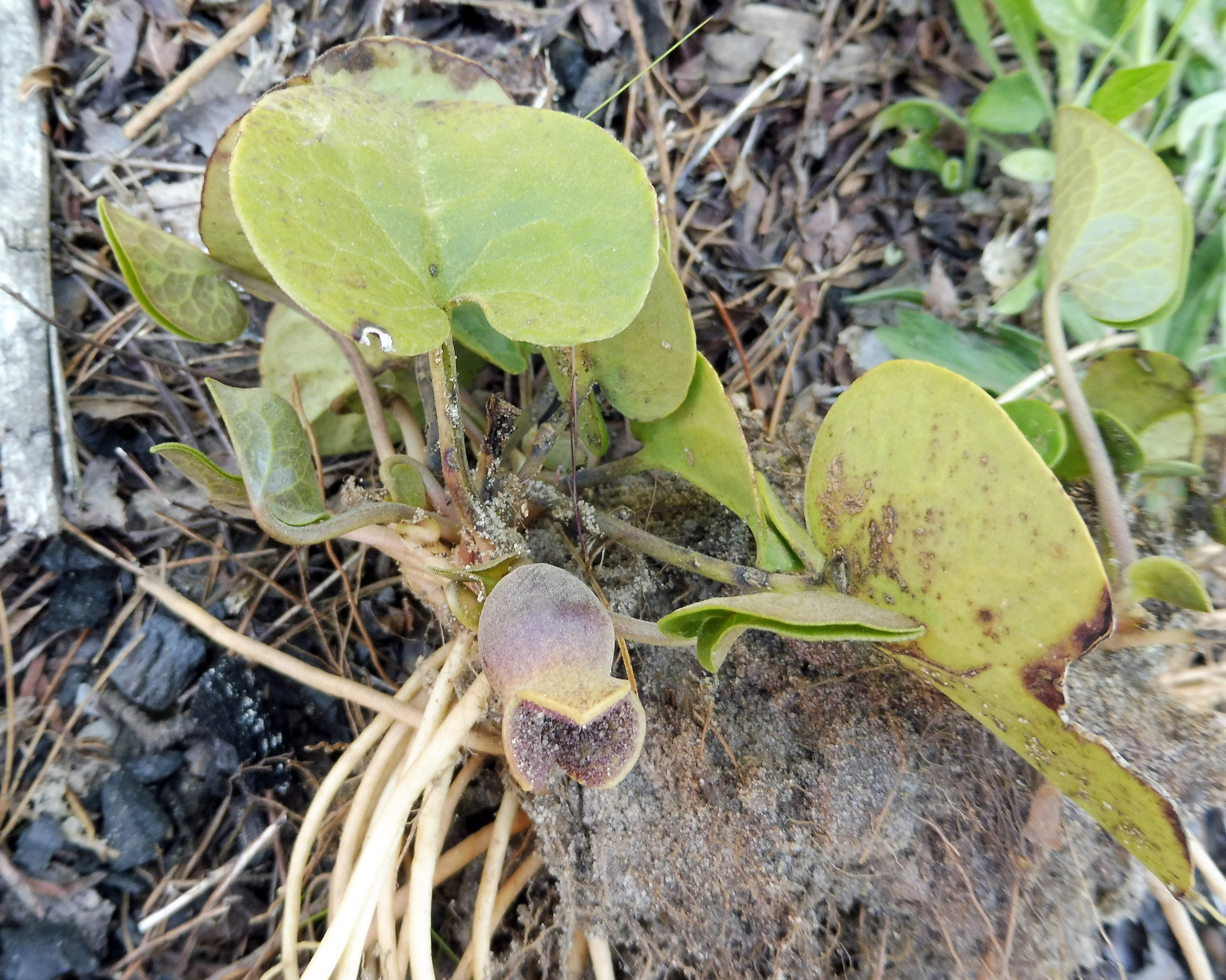

Conservation status
- Vulnerable (NatureServe)

Scientific classification
- Kingdom: Plantae
- Clade: Tracheophytes
- Clade: Angiosperms
- Clade: Magnoliids
- Order: Piperales
- Family: Aristolochiaceae
- Genus: Asarum
- Species: A. contractum

Binomial name
- Asarum contractum (H.L.Blomq.) Barringer

= Asarum contractum =

Species of flowering plant

Asarum contractum, commonly known as the mountain heartleaf, is a species of flowering plant in the pipevine family.

It is native to eastern North America, where it has an unusual distribution. It is nearly endemic to the Cumberland Plateau of Kentucky and Tennessee, but there are disjunct populations in the Blue Ridge Mountains in North Carolina and Virginia. Its preferred habitat is the deep shade of acidic forests, often growing under Kalmia latifolia and Rhododendron maximum. Due to its restricted range, it is considered vulnerable.

It flowers in late spring, where it produces a tube shaped flower at ground level.

Its homotypic synonym is Hexastylis contracta.
