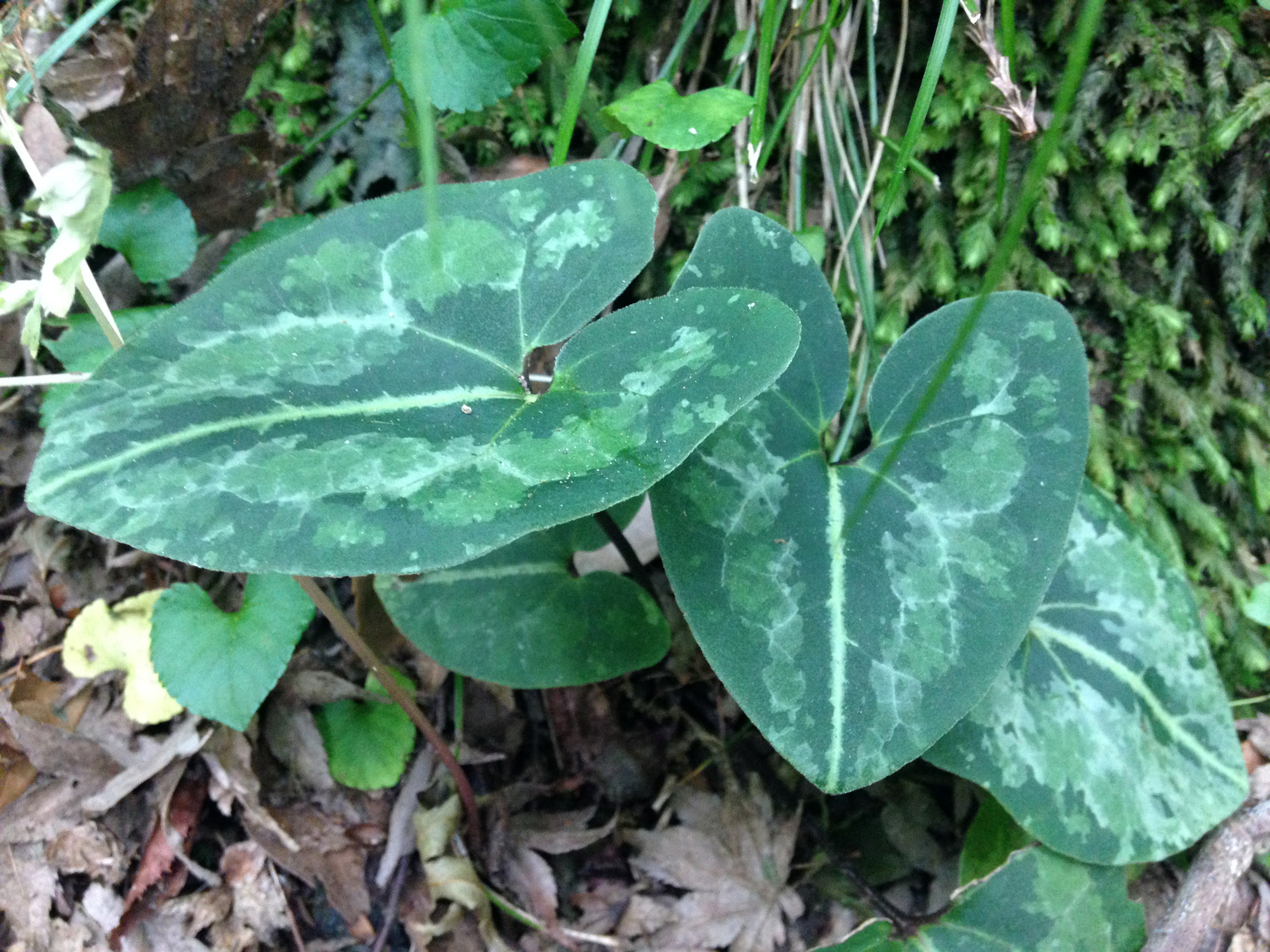

Scientific classification
- Kingdom: Plantae
- Clade: Tracheophytes
- Clade: Angiosperms
- Clade: Magnoliids
- Order: Piperales
- Family: Aristolochiaceae
- Genus: Asarum
- Species: A. asperum

Binomial name
- Asarum asperum F.Maek.

Synonyms
- Heterotropa aspera (F.Maek.) F.Maek.

= Asarum asperum =

Species of flowering plant

Asarum asperum is a species of flowering plant in the pipevine family, Aristolochiaceae. It is endemic to Japan, where it is found on Shikoku and in the western regions of Honshu. It is particularly common in the vicinity of Kyoto and Nara.

It is a perennial that produces thick evergreen leaves, which are ovate-orbicular and have a subhastate base. It produces ground-level maroon flowers, that are pollinated by insects. The flowering tube is prominently constricted at its apex. It blooms in April. It forms colonies on the forest floor, where it often grows co-occurs with Ainsliaea cordifolia, with which it bears a resemblance.

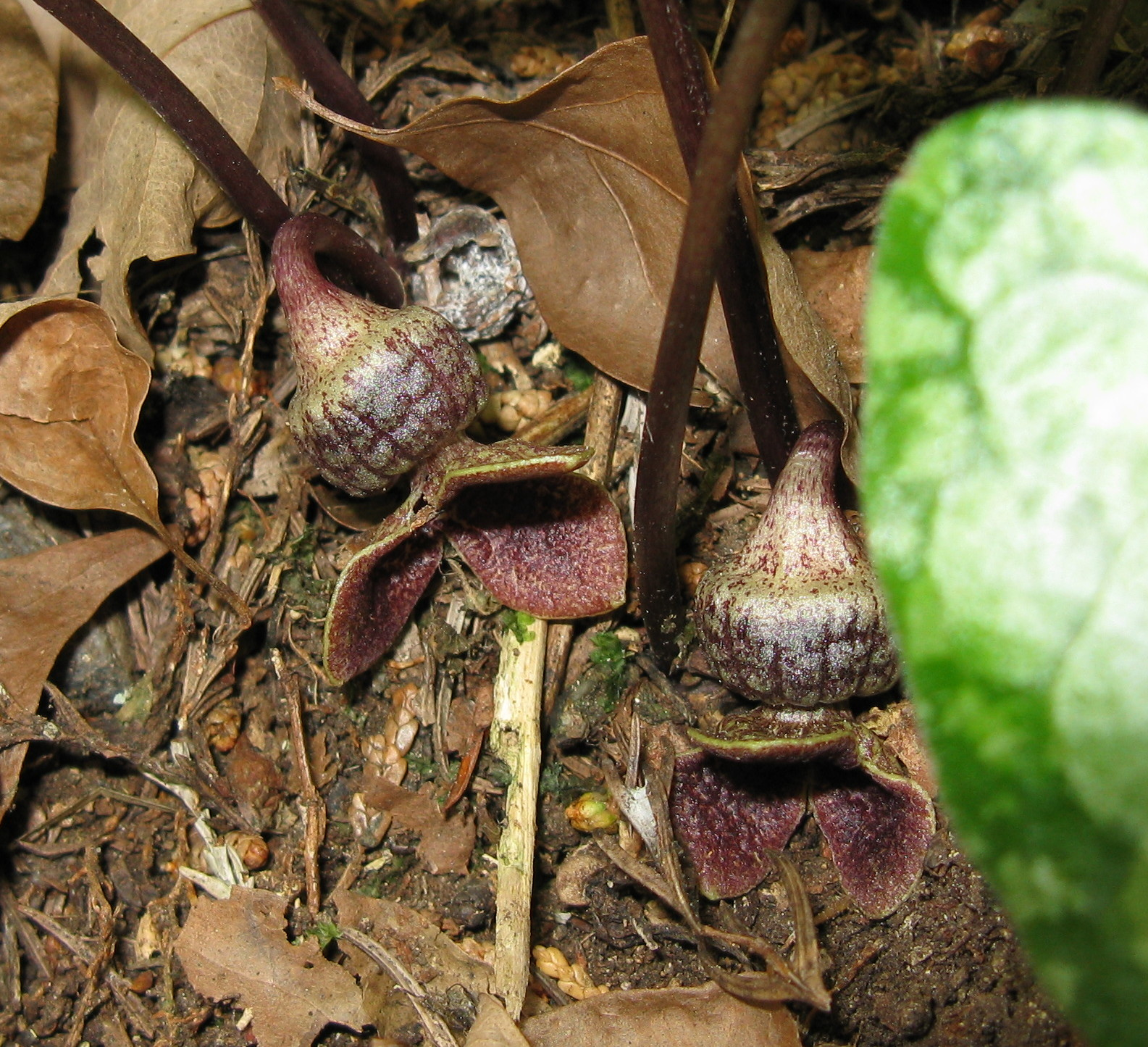
Detail of flowers
