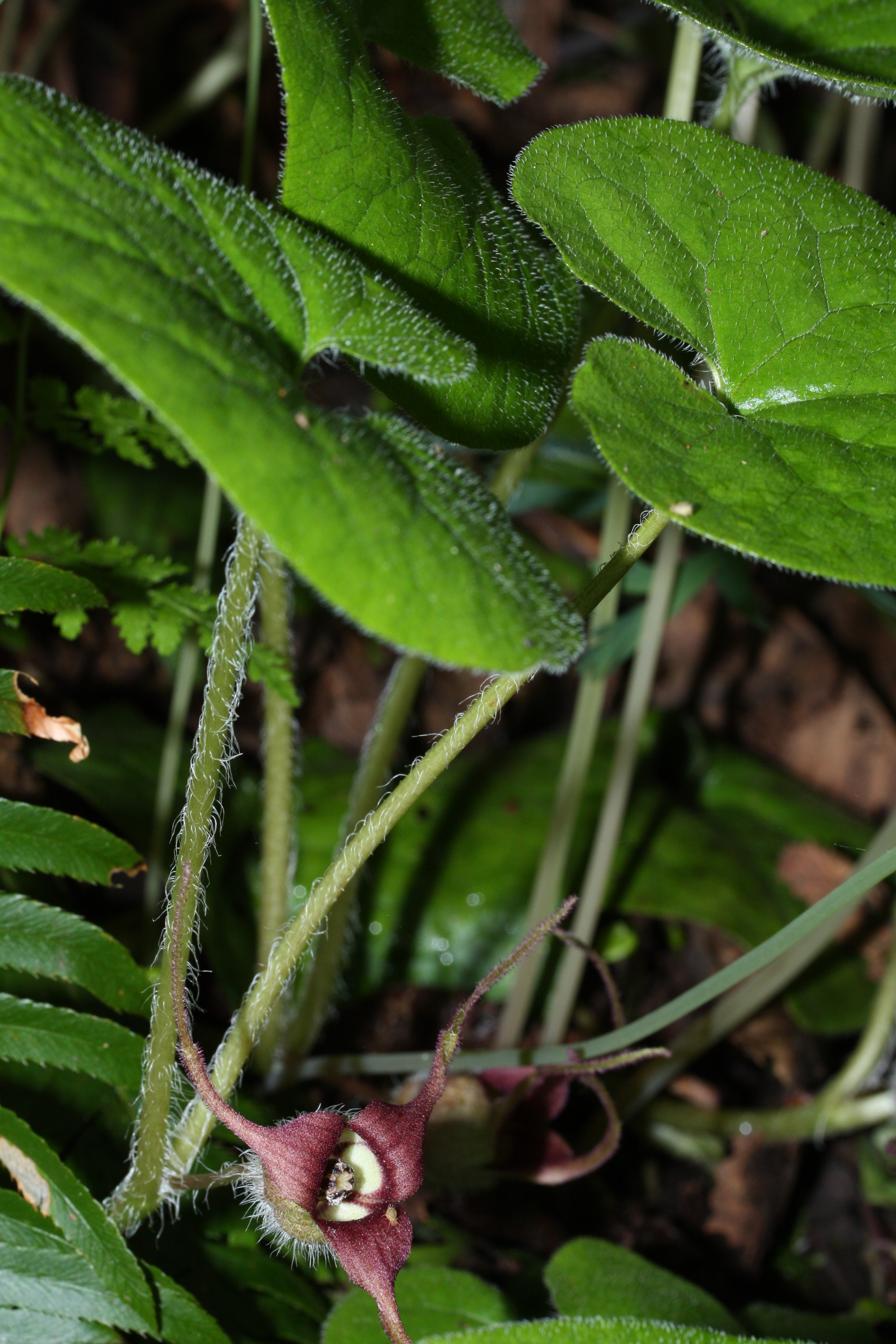
- Asarum caudatum (western wild ginger)

Scientific classification
- Kingdom: Plantae
- Clade: Tracheophytes
- Clade: Angiosperms
- Clade: Magnoliids
- Order: Piperales
- Family: Aristolochiaceae
- Subfamily: Asaroideae
- Genus: Asarum; L.

Type species
- Asarum europaeum

Species
- See text

Synonyms
- Asiasarum F.Maek.; Heterotropa C.Morren & Decne.; Hexastylis Raf.; Japonasarum Nakai

= Asarum =

Genus of flowering plants

Asarum is a genus of plants in the birthwort family Aristolochiaceae, commonly known as wild ginger.

Asarum is from Greek ἄσαρον, a name for Asarum europaeum.

== Description ==
Asarum is a genus of low-growing herbs distributed across the temperate zones of the Northern Hemisphere, with most species in East Asia (China, Japan, and Vietnam) and North America, and one species in Europe. Biogeographically, Asarum originated in Asia.

They have characteristic kidney-shaped leaves, growing from creeping rhizomes, and bear small, axillary, brown or reddish flowers.

The plant is called wild ginger because the rhizomes and leaves taste and smell similar to ginger root, but the two are not particularly related. The FDA warns against consuming Asarum, as it is nephrotoxic and contains the potent carcinogen aristolochic acid. The birthwort family also contains the genus Aristolochia, known for carcinogens.

Wild ginger favors moist, shaded sites with humus-rich soil. The deciduous, heart-shaped leaves are opposite, and borne from the rhizome which lies just under the soil surface. Two leaves emerge each year from the growing tip. The curious jug-shaped flowers, which give the plant an alternate name, little jug, are borne singly in spring between the leaf bases.

Wild ginger can easily be grown in a shade garden, and makes an attractive groundcover.

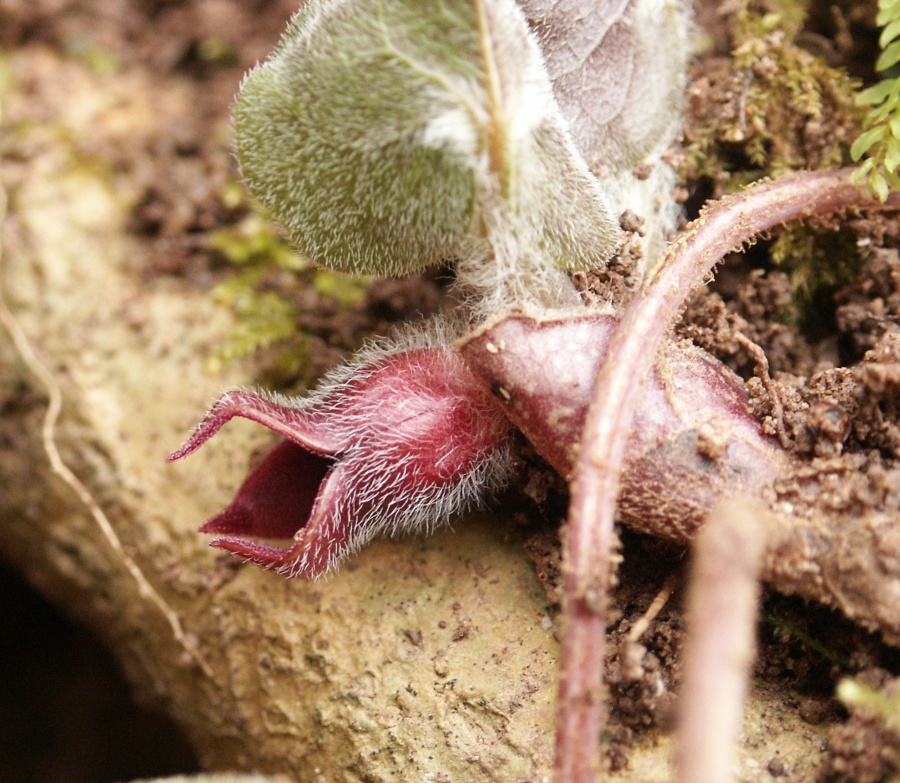
Asarum europaeum flower

== Taxonomy ==
Traditionally, the genus Asarum was considered as a single genus with about 85 species. However, a trend exists among some botanists to segregate the genus into separate genera, based on considerations of chromosome number and floral morphology:

- Asarum sensu stricto (about 17 species), distributed in Asia (mainly China), North America, and Europe
- Heterotropa (about 50 species), distributed in Asia
- siasarum (three or four species), distributed in Asia
- Geotaenium (three or four species), distributed in Asia
- Hexastylis (ten species), distributed in North America

Study of the internal transcribed spacer region (ITS) of nuclear ribosomal DNA, combined with morphological data, has yielded a better-resolved phylogenetic hypothesis, supporting a recognition of two subgenera, Asarum and Heterotropa each containing two sections, rather than the segregated genera above.

- Asarum sensu stricto (s.s.) : the North American species are monophyletic and are derived from within the paraphyletic Asian species group.
- Geotaenium is a sister to Asarum s.s., showing its close relationship to Asarum s.s..
- Asiasarum is a sister to the Hexastylis + Heterotropa clade, showing several synapomorphies with this clade.
- Hexastylis: this genus has been recognized solely on the study by H.L. Blomquist. However, the above-mentioned DNA study provided indications that Hexastylis is not monophyletic and that some species of Hexastylis are more closely related to Asiatic species of Heterotropa than they are to other species of Hexastylis. The recognition of Hexastylis has likely persisted due to regional botanists' contrasting the morphology of that section with the regionally co-occurring Asarum canadense, which is the sole species of Asarum subgenus Asarum in the southeastern United States. However, the morphological character states used to support the recognition of section Hexastylis at the generic level are plesiomorphic. For example, Blomquist provides an enumeration of character states supporting Hexastylis, all of are plesiomorphic with respect to one or another Asarum lineage. The presence of persistent, variegated leaves is often invoked by amateur botanists as a characteristic unique to section Hexastylis amongst North American Asarum species, however Asarum marmoratum, an Asarum Subgenus Asarum species found in the western United States also has persistent and variegated leaves (see Calflora page for detailed photographs)
- Heterotropa: this is a complex monophyletic group, well nested within the Asiasarum + Hexastylis + Heterotropa clade.

== Species ==
137 species are accepted.

- Asarum acuminatum (Ashe) E.P.Bicknell
- Asarum ampulliflorum C.T.Lu & J.C.Wang
- Asarum arifolium Michx.
- Asarum asaroides (C.Morren & Decne.) Makino
- Asarum asperum F.Maek.
- Asarum balansae Franch.
- Asarum bashanense Z.L.Yang
- Asarum blumei Duch.
- Asarum campaniflorum Yong Wang & Q.F.Wang
- Asarum canadense L.
- Asarum cardiophyllum Franch.
- Asarum caucasicum (Duch.) N.Busch
- Asarum caudatum Lindl.
- Asarum caudigerellum C.Y.Chen & C.S.Yang
- Asarum caudigerum Hance
- Asarum caulescens Maxim.
- Asarum celsum F.Maek. ex Hatus. & Yamahata
- Asarum chatienshanianum C.T.Lu & J.C.Wang
- Asarum chengkouense Z.L.Yang
- Asarum chinense Franch.
- Asarum chueyi Sinn
- Asarum contractum (H.L.Blomq.) Barringer
- Asarum cordifolium C.E.C.Fisch.
- Asarum costatum (F.Maek.) T.Sugaw.
- Asarum crassisepalum S.F.Huang, T.H.Hsieh & T.C.Huang
- Asarum crassum F.Maek.
- Asarum crispulatum C.Y.Chen & C.S.Yang
- Asarum curvistigma F.Maek.
- Asarum debile Franch.
- Asarum delavayi Franch.
- Asarum dilatatum (F.Maek.) T.Sugaw.
- Asarum dissitum F.Maek. ex Hatus. & Yamahata
- Asarum epigynum Hayata
- Asarum europaeum L.
- Asarum fauriei Franch.
- Asarum finzelii (B.R.Keener) Diamond
- Asarum forbesii Maxim.
- Asarum fudsinoi T.Itô
- Asarum fukienense C.Y.Chen & C.S.Yang
- Asarum gelasinum Hatus. & Yamahata
- Asarum geophilum Hemsl.
- Asarum glabrum Merr.
- Asarum gusk Hatus. & Yamahata
- Asarum harperi (Gaddy) Diamond
- Asarum hartwegii S.Watson
- Asarum hatsushimae F.Maek. ex Hatus. & Yamahata
- Asarum heterophyllum Ashe
- Asarum heterotropoides F.Schmidt
- Asarum hexalobum F.Maek.
- Asarum himalaicum Hook.f. & Thomson ex Klotzsch
- Asarum hongkongense S.M.Hwang & Wong Sui
- Asarum hypogynum Hayata
- Asarum ichangense C.Y.Chen & C.S.Yang
- Asarum ikegamii (F.Maek. ex Y.Maek.) T.Sugaw.
- Asarum inflatum C.Y.Chen & C.S.Yang
- Asarum insigne Diels
- Asarum kinoshitae (F.Maek. ex Kinosh.) T.Sugaw.
- Asarum kiusianum F.Maek.
- Asarum kooyanum Makino
- Asarum koreanum J.G.Kim & C.S.Yook ex B.U.Oh
- Asarum kumageanum Masam.
- Asarum kurosawae Sugim.
- Asarum lemmonii S.Watson
- Asarum leucosepalum Hatus. ex Yamahata
- Asarum lewisii Fernald
- Asarum longerhizomatosum C.F.Liang & C.S.Yang
- Asarum lutchuense (Honda) Koidz.
- Asarum macranthum Hook.f.
- Asarum magnificum Tsiang ex C.Y.Cheng & C.S.Yang
- Asarum majale T.Sugaw.
- Asarum marmoratum Piper
- Asarum maruyamae Yamaji & Ter.Nakam.
- Asarum maximum Hemsl.
- Asarum megacalyx (F.Maek.) T.Sugaw.
- Asarum mikuniense Yamaji & Ter.Nakam.
- Asarum minamitanianum Hatus.
- Asarum minus Ashe
- Asarum misandrum B.U.Oh & J.G.Kim
- Asarum mitoanum T.Sugaw.
- Asarum monodoriflorum Hatus. & Yamahata
- Asarum muramatsui Makino
- Asarum nanchuanense C.S.Yang & J.L.Wu
- Asarum nazeanum T.Sugaw.
- Asarum nipponicum F.Maek.
- Asarum nobilissimum Z.L.Yang
- Asarum nomadakense Hatus.
- Asarum okinawense Hatus.
- Asarum parviflorum Regel
- Asarum pellucidum Hatus. & Yamahata
- Asarum petelotii O.C.Schmidt
- Asarum porphyronotum C.Y.Chen & C.S.Yang
- Asarum pubitessellatum C.T.Lu & J.C.Wang
- Asarum pulchellum Hemsl.
- Asarum reflexum E.P.Bicknell
- Asarum renicordatum C.Y.Chen & C.S.Yang
- Asarum reticulatum Merr.
- Asarum rhombiformis (Gaddy) Sinn
- Asarum rigescens F.Maek.
- Asarum robilissimum Z.L.Yang
- Asarum rollinsiae (B.R.Keener & Todia) Diamond
- Asarum rosei Sinn
- Asarum sagittarioides C.F.Liang
- Asarum sakawanum Makino
- Asarum satsumense F.Maek.
- Asarum savatieri Franch.
- Asarum senkakuinsulare Hatus.
- Asarum shoukaense S.S.Ying
- Asarum shuttleworthii Britten & Baker f.
- Asarum sieboldii Miq.
- Asarum simile Hatus. & Yamahata
- Asarum sorriei (Gaddy) Sinn
- Asarum splendens (F.Maek.) C.Y.Chen & C.S.Yang
- Asarum sprengeri Pamp.
- Asarum subglobosum F.Maek. ex Hatus. & Yamahata
- Asarum tabatanum T.Sugaw.
- Asarum taipingshanianum S.F.Huang, T.H.Hsieh & T.C.Huang
- Asarum tamaense Makino
- Asarum tawushanianum C.T.Lu & J.C.Wang
- Asarum tohokuense Yamaji & Ter.Nakam.
- Asarum tokarense Hatus. & Yamahata
- Asarum tongjiangense Z.L.Yang
- Asarum trigynum (F.Maek.) Araki
- Asarum trinacriforme Hatus. & Yamahata
- Asarum tungyanshanianum S.S.Ying
- Asarum unzen (F.Maek.) Kitam. & Murata
- Asarum villisepalum C.T.Lu & J.C.Wang
- Asarum virginicum L.
- Asarum viridiflorum Regel
- Asarum wagneri K.L.Lu & M.R.Mesler
- Asarum wannanense Lu Q.Huang & H.S.Peng
- Asarum wulingense C.F.Liang
- Asarum yaeyamense Hatus.
- Asarum yakusimense Masam.
- Asarum yentuense N.A.Tuan & Sasamoto
- Asarum yeonbyeonense M.Kim & S.So
- Asarum yoshikawae T.Sugaw.
- Asarum yunnanense T.Sugaw., Ogisu & C.Y.Cheng

== Uses ==
The FDA warns against consuming Asarum, as it is nephrotoxic and contains the potent carcinogen aristolochic acid. Before this was known, sources said that wild ginger can be cooked in the same fashion as ginger root, and can also be candied or used to make medicine.
