= Asarum crispulatum =

Conservation status
- Vulnerable (IUCN 3.1)

Scientific classification
- Kingdom: Plantae
- Clade: Tracheophytes
- Clade: Angiosperms
- Clade: Magnoliids
- Order: Piperales
- Family: Aristolochiaceae
- Genus: Asarum
- Species: A. crispulatum

Binomial name
- Asarum crispulatum C.Y.Cheng & C.S.Yang

Species of plant

Asarum crispulatum is a species of plant in the family Aristolochiaceae. It is endemic to China.
