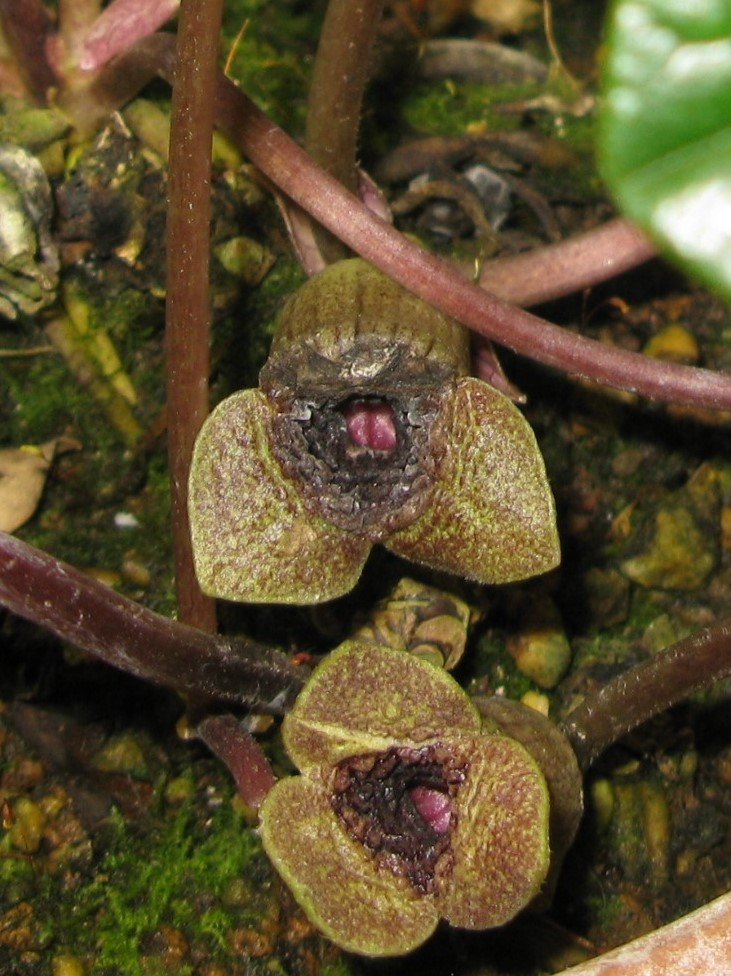

Scientific classification
- Kingdom: Plantae
- Clade: Tracheophytes
- Clade: Angiosperms
- Clade: Magnoliids
- Order: Piperales
- Family: Aristolochiaceae
- Genus: Asarum
- Species: A. senkakuinsulare

Binomial name
- Asarum senkakuinsulare Hatus.

Synonyms
- Heterotropa senkakuinsularis (Hatus.) F.Maek. ex Y.Maek.

= Asarum senkakuinsulare =

Species of flowering plants

Asarum senkakuinsulare is a species of Asarum found in Nansei-shoto (Senkaku Islands, Uotsuri-jima).
