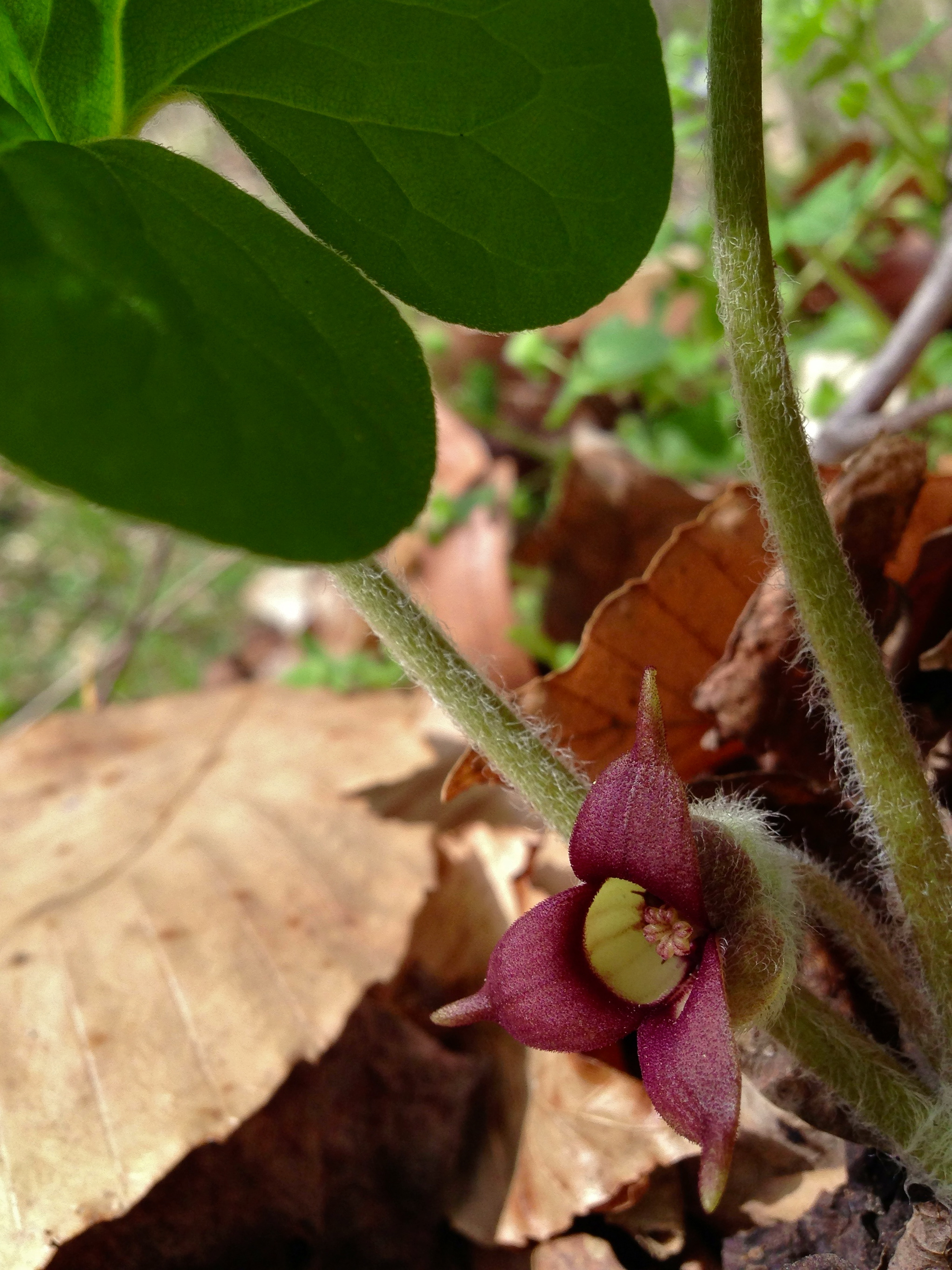

Conservation status
- Secure (NatureServe)

Scientific classification
- Kingdom: Plantae
- Clade: Tracheophytes
- Clade: Angiosperms
- Clade: Magnoliids
- Order: Piperales
- Family: Aristolochiaceae
- Genus: Asarum
- Species: A. canadense

Binomial name
- Asarum canadense L.

Synonyms
- A. canadense var. acuminatum A. canadense var. ambiguum A. rubrocinctum

= Asarum canadense =

Species of flowering plant

Asarum canadense, commonly known as Canada wild ginger, Canadian snakeroot, Indian Ginger, Coltsfoot, and Broad-Leaved Asarabacca, is a herbaceous, perennial plant. It should not be confused for Asarum reflexum, a closely related species, or Asarum acuminatum, a variety of A. canadense.

It forms dense colonies in the understory of deciduous forests throughout its native range in eastern North America. It is protected as a threatened species in Maine due to habitat loss. The species has been used by Native Americans for cooking and medicine, although recent research has suggested that compounds within the plant could cause negative health problems.

== Description ==
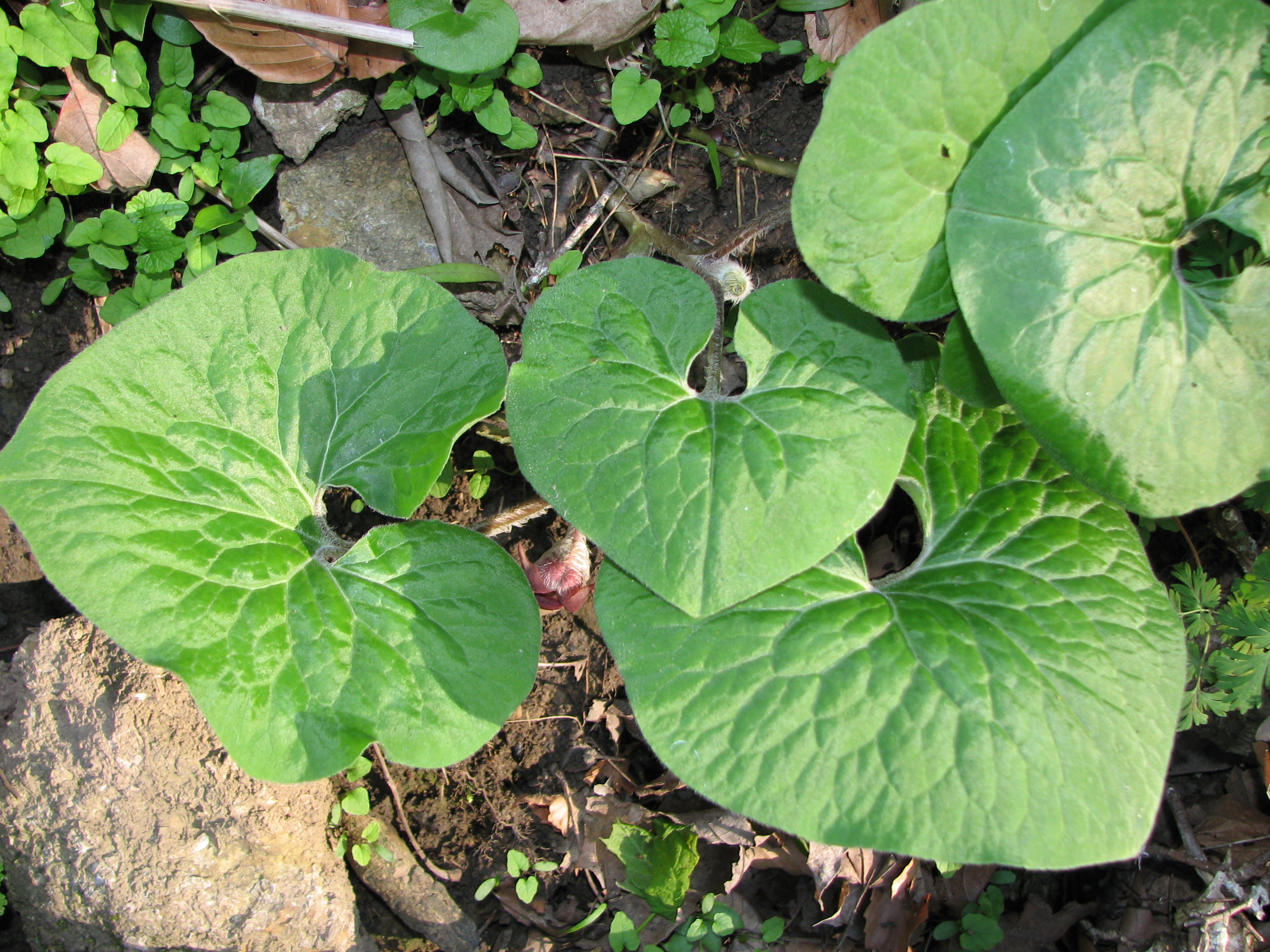
Leaves

=== Non-Reproductive Structures ===
Its leaves are velvety, kidney-shaped, and persistent, exhibiting a unique iridescence when in full sun. Underground shoots are shallow-growing, fleshy rhizomes that branch to form a clump.

=== Flowers and Fruit ===
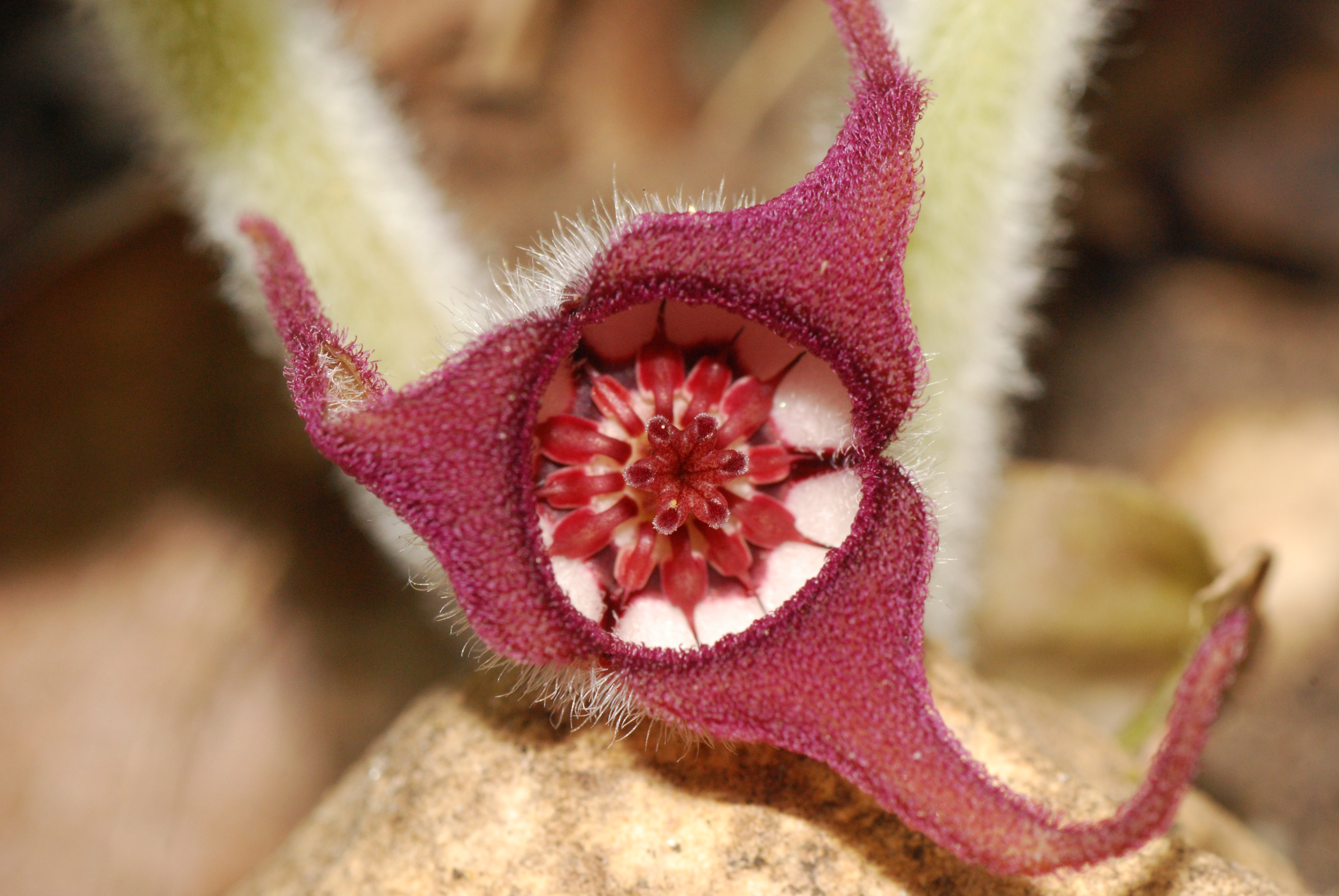
Flower

It has bisexual flowers that bloom from April through June. They are hairy and have three sepals. The flowers are tan to purple in color on the outside and lighter on the inside, with tapered tips and bases fused into a cup. There are two sets of stamens within flowers, with one being longer than the other (heterostyly). Pollinated flowers develop into a pod, which splits open when ripe to reveal seeds with elaiosomes, structures that are eaten by ants (myrmecochory).

== Distribution and Reproduction ==
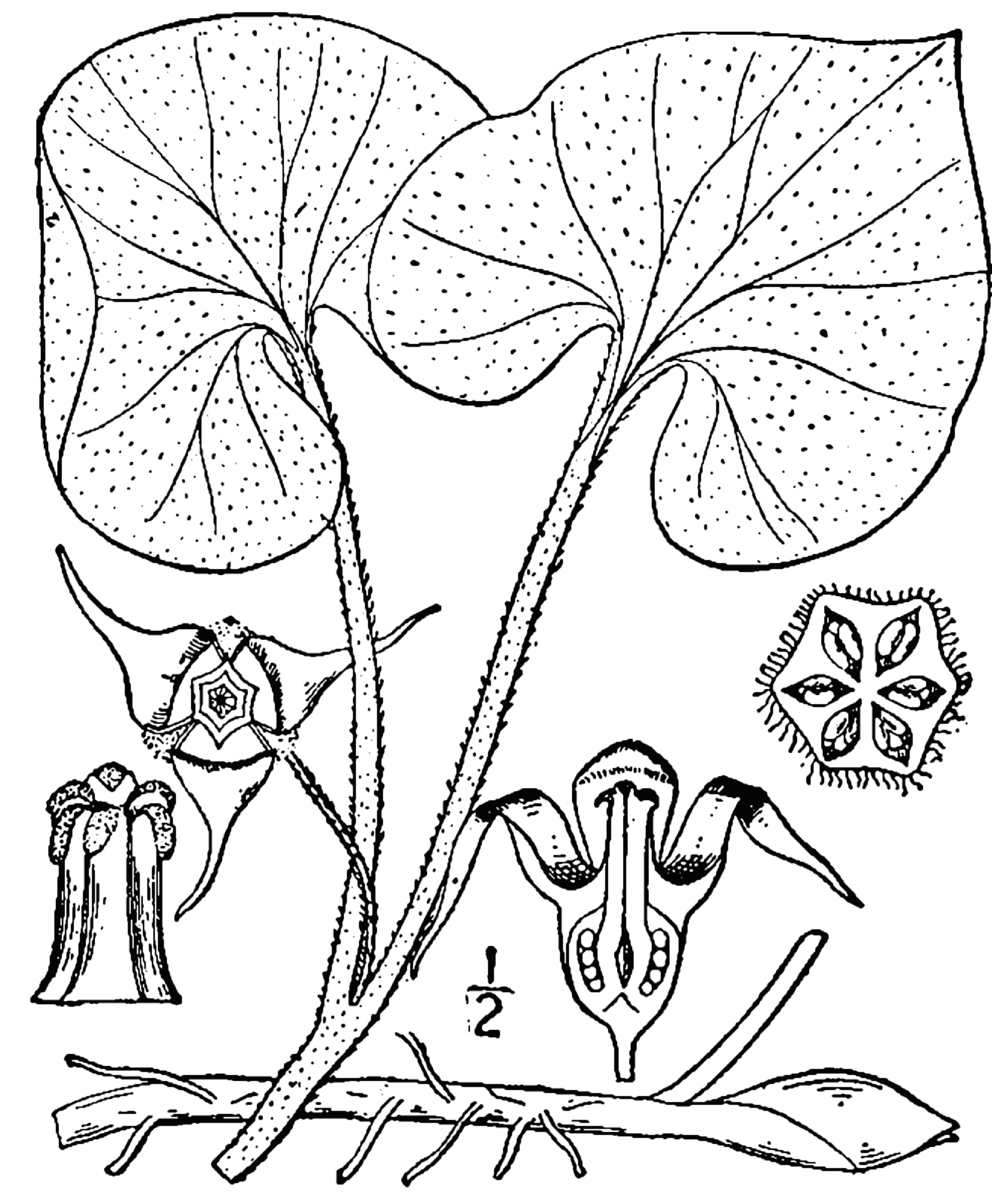
Drawing of the structure of Asarum canadense including features such as flower, ovule placentation, leaves, and rhizomes.

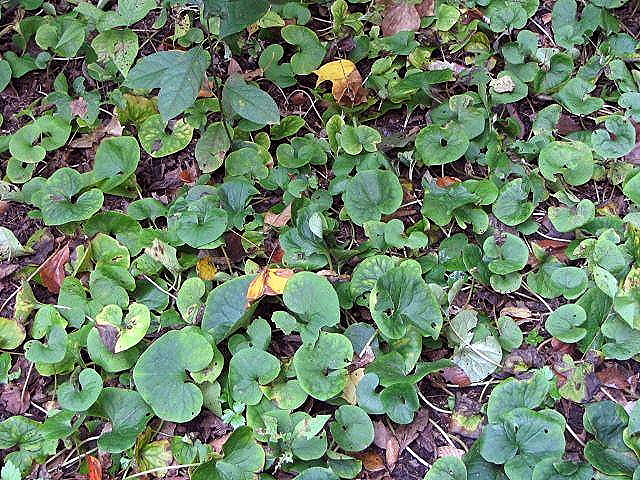
Dense patch of Asarum canadense

=== Habitat ===
The plant forms dense colonies in the understory of deciduous forests throughout its native range in eastern North America, from the Great Plains east to the Atlantic Coast, and from southeastern Canada south to around the Fall Line in the southeastern United States. Shaded habitats lead to longer surviving ramets and more genetically unique genets. Yet, individuals within environments with more shade are thought to have less energy to devote towards defenses against herbivores. Extensive logging in Maine is thought to be the reason for the species' threatened status in the state.

=== Reproduction ===
The species' primary form of reproduction is through clones spread via rhizomes, although it can also produce genetically different seedlings via self-pollination. Individuals produced by asexual reproduction are able to use energy more efficiently and develop larger leaves, but the trade-offs between sexual reproduction and asexual are thought to be insignificant. Although some local populations are at risk of extirpation, they can be reestablished even through low initial plantings.

=== Seed Dispersion ===
They have a mutualistic relationship with ants, as their seeds are primarily dispersed by the insects. Seeds are brought back to ant nests where elaisomes are removed and fed to larvae. Once elaisomes are consumed, ants will relocate the seeds away from the nest to avoid the risk of fungal spread. Removal of seeds from the parent plant helps to reduce seed predation from predators and may also place seeds in a more optimum germination environment. Seeds are on average transported a distance of 32 - 39 centimeters from the parent plant, although large distances up to 36 meters have been reported. Although seeds are primarily dispersed short distances, research suggests seeds were dispersed long distances through large-scale meteorological events or via birds in the past. The seeds exhibit morphophysiological dormancy, requiring a period of both warm and cold stratification (epicotyl dormancy). Seeds are at a moderate to high risk of seed predation primarily by rodents and slugs.

== Composition ==
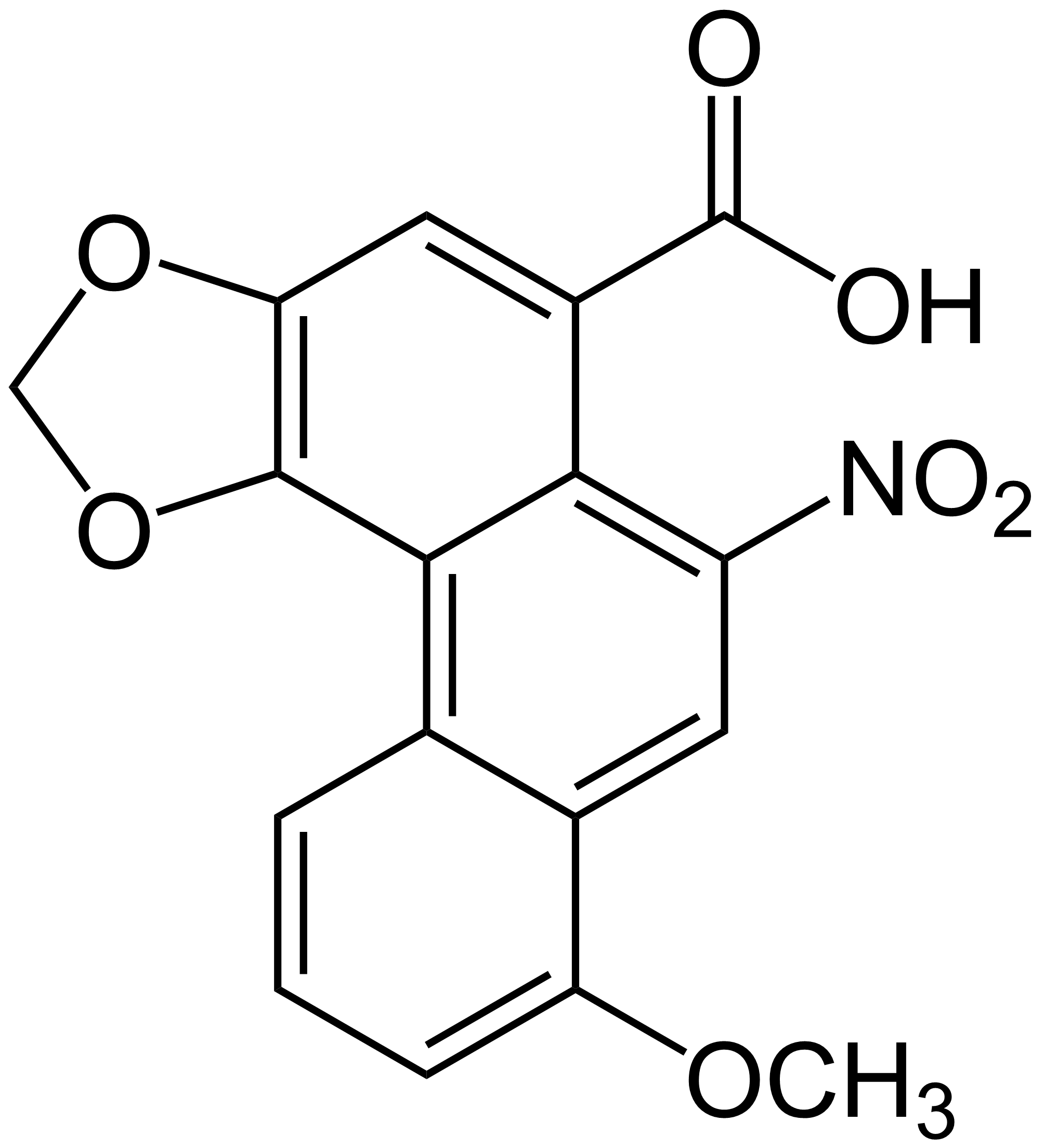
Chemical diagram of aristolochic acid.

The oil within rhizomes and roots is known as Canadian snakeroot oil. Although it contains many compounds, the two primary compounds are methyleugenol and linalool. The oil also contains aristolochic acid I in high quantities, which is thought to cause hephrotoxic and carcinogenic effects.

== Uses ==
=== Cooking ===
The long rhizomes of A. canadense were historically used by Native Americans as a seasoning. The odor and flavor of Canadian snakeroot oil are spicy and has been used in many flavor preparations. However, due to it containing aristolochic acid I, it is not recommended for consumption.

=== Medicinal Uses ===
Historically, Native Americans used the plant as a medicinal herb to treat a number of ailments including dysentery, digestive problems, swollen breasts, coughs and colds, typhus, scarlet fever, nerves, sore throats, cramps, heaves, earaches, headaches, convulsions, asthma, tuberculosis, urinary disorders, and venereal disease. In addition, they also used it as a stimulant, appetite enhancer, charm and an admixture to strengthen other herbal preparations.

Tribes that used the species medicinally and culinarily include the Chippewa, the Iroquois, the Ojibwe, the Meskwaki, the Menomini, the Potawatomi, the Cherokee, the Abnaki, and the Micmac.

=== Other Uses ===
More recently, it has been recommended as a native ground cover that can tolerate shade. Because it can reproduce asexually, it can be propagated by cutting the rhizomes where a dormant shoot bud and roots exist.
