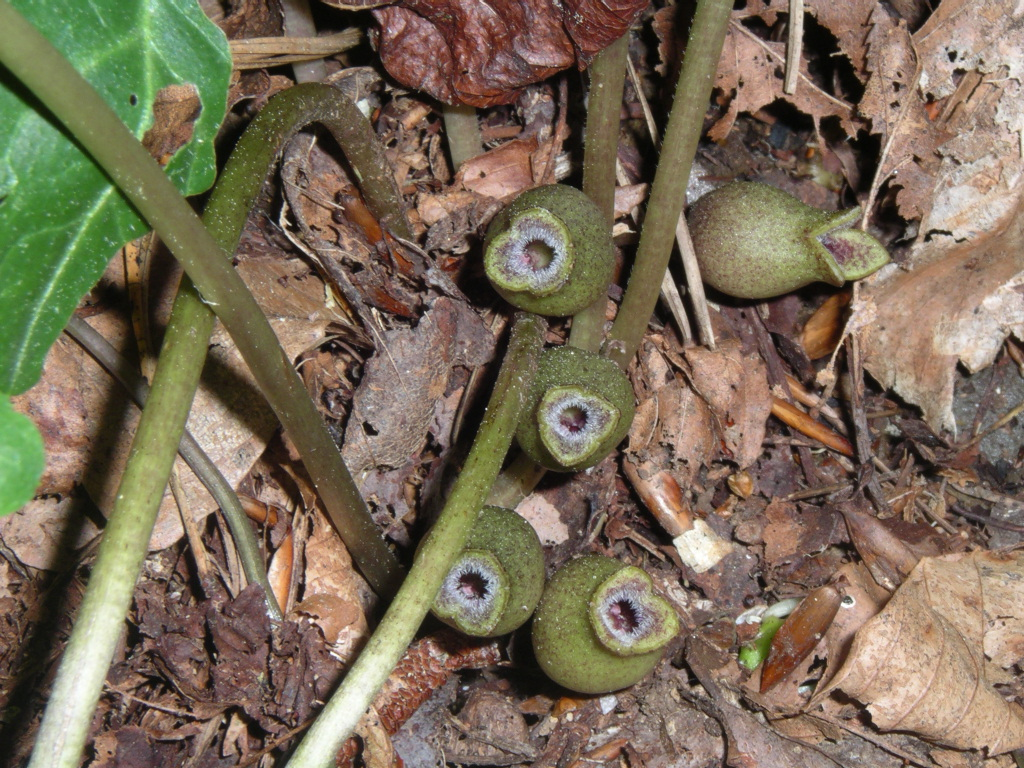
- The unique inflorescence of Asarum arifolia which inspire its common name, "little brown jug."

Conservation status
- Secure (NatureServe)

Scientific classification
- Kingdom: Plantae
- Clade: Tracheophytes
- Clade: Angiosperms
- Clade: Magnoliids
- Order: Piperales
- Family: Aristolochiaceae
- Genus: Asarum
- Species: A. arifolia

Binomial name
- Asarum arifolia Michx. 1803

Synonyms
- Hexastylis arifolium Michx. Small

= Asarum arifolium =

Species of flowering plant

Asarum arifolia (common names the little brown jug, arrowleaf, and heartleaf) is a perennial wildflower in the family Aristolochiaceae found in the southeastern United States, from Louisiana to Virginia, inland as far as Kentucky. It is considered a threatened species in Florida. The appearance of the flowers of Asarum arifolia, growing near the ground at the base of the plant, give it the common name "little brown jug."

== Description ==
Asarum arifolia is an evergreen, perennial herb with no above-ground stems, spreading by means of underground rhizomes.

Leaves are hairless, of two sorts. Small, scale-like leaves adhere to the underground rhizomes, while larger green, heart-shaped leaves emerge above ground. Flowers are formed one at a time, on the ends of the rhizomes.

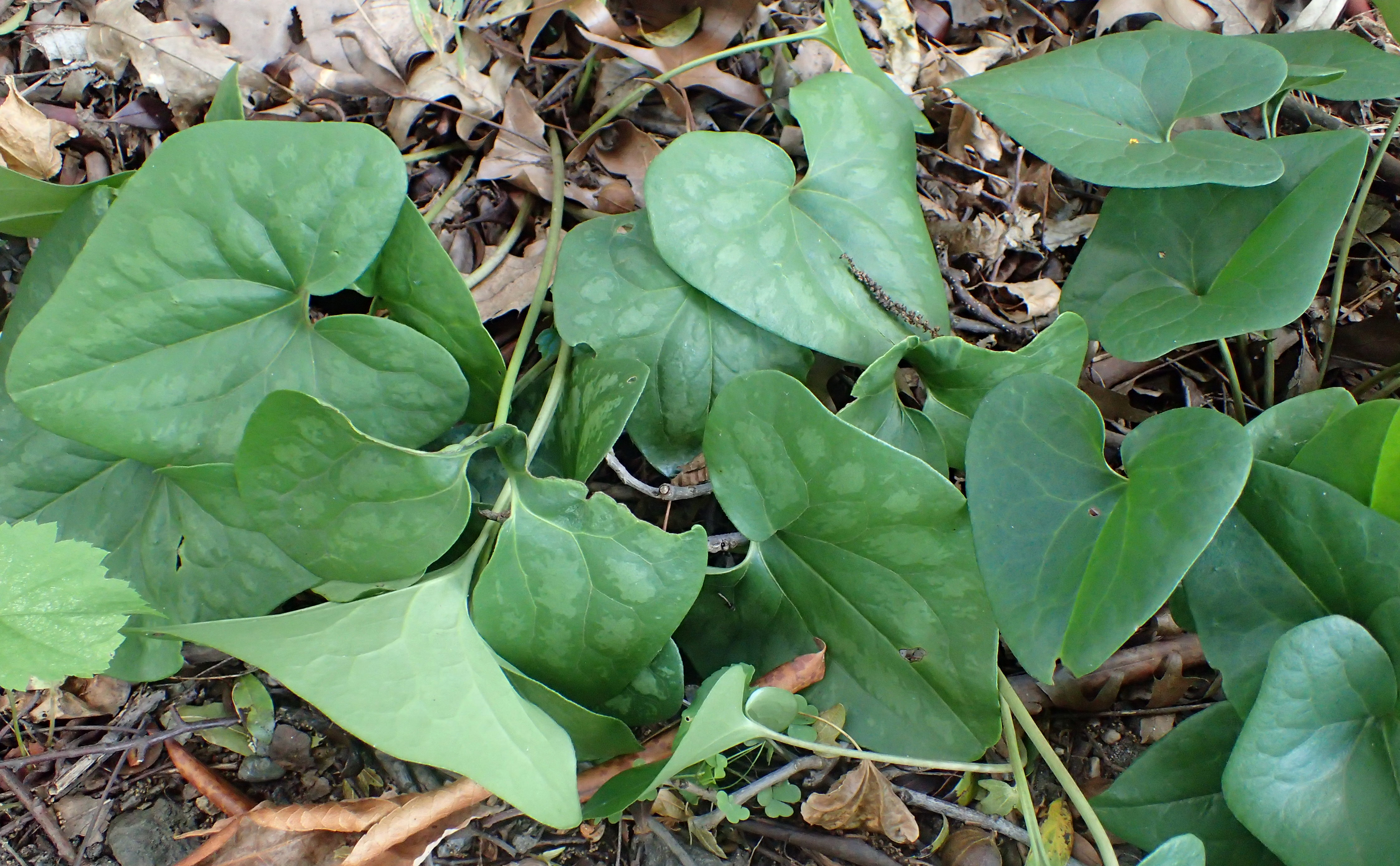
Foliage

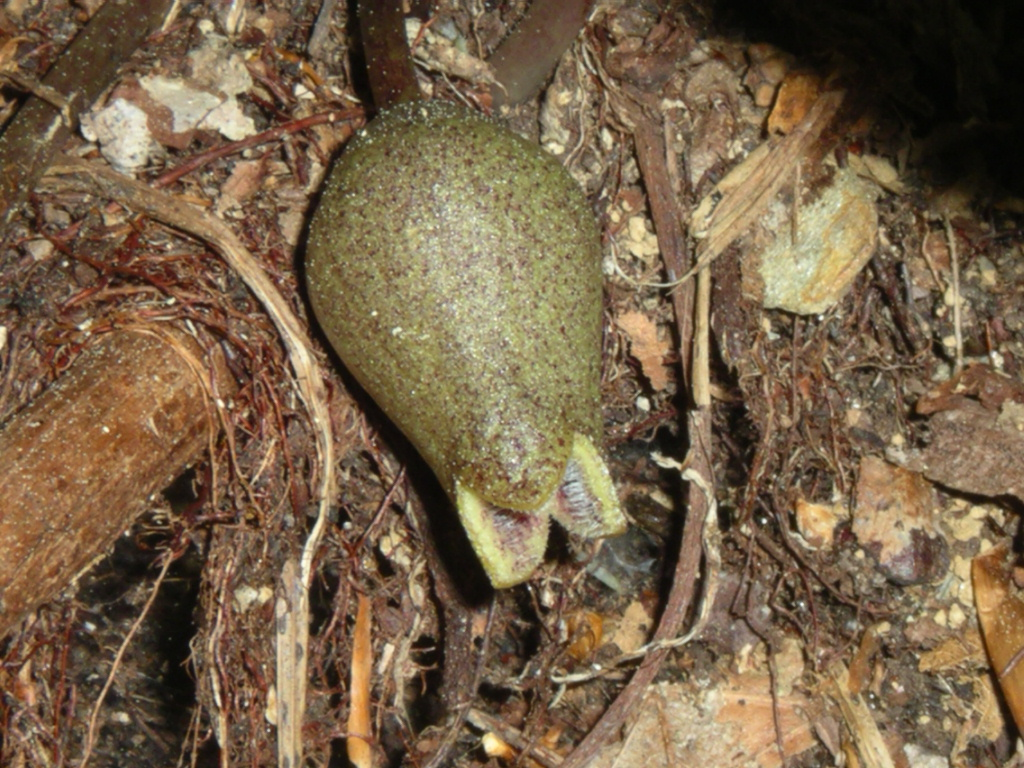
Asarum arifolia

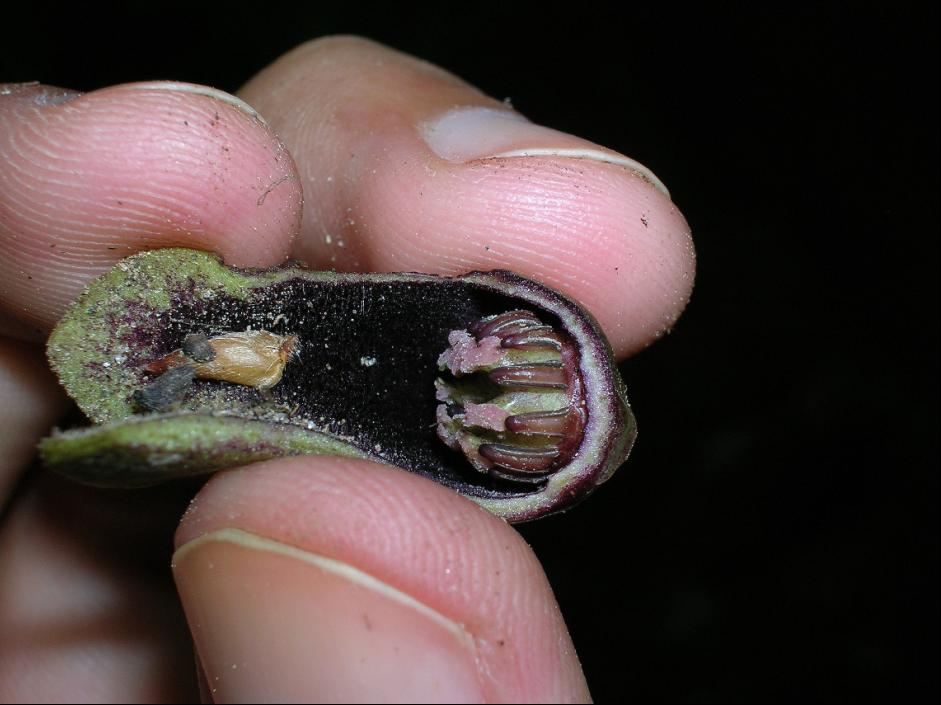
Asarum arifolia flower, cut to reveal the internal structures.
