= List of plants endemic to the Appalachian Mountains =

This is a list of plants that are endemic to the Appalachian Mountains of North America.

== Significance ==
The Appalachian Mountains of Eastern North America are a biodiversity hotspot. Like other mountains, the Appalachians have high rates of endemism because they create isolated "islands" of unique habitat conditions distant from other, similar habitats. The high elevations of the Appalachians functioned as refugia at the end of the last ice age, and house many relict taxa that were more widespread in Southeastern North America when the climate was cooler. Together with the rugged, heterogenous topography and mild, wet climate, these factors make the Appalachians one of the most biodiverse temperate regions in the world.

== List ==
- Abies fraseri - Fraser fir.Endemic to high elevations of the Appalachian mountains.
- Aconitum reclinatum - trailing white monkshood.
- Actaea podocarpa - mountain bugbane.
- Ageratina luciae-brauniae - endemic to sandstone rockhouses in Tennessee and Kentucky.
- Ageratina roanensis
- Allium allegheniense
- Allium keeverae
- Allium oxyphilum
- Ambrosia porcheri- exists only in Pickens County and Greenville County of South Carolina.
- Amorpha glabra - Appalachian indigo-bush. It grows in the mountains of western North Carolina.
- Anemone minima - tiny anemone.
- Angelica triquinata
- Astilbe crenatiloba
- Blephilia subnuda
- Borodinia serotina- shale-barrens rockcress. It is found only in Virginia and West Virginia.
- Boykinia aconitifolia
- Bryodesma tortipilum - twisted-hair spikemoss, found only in a narrow range from western North Carolina to north Georgia.
- Buckleya distichophylla- piratebush. It is a hemiparasitic shrub that is only found in the Appalachian Mountains of Virginia, North Carolina, and Tennessee.
- Calamagrostis cainii
- Campanula divaricata- small bonny bellflower.
- Cardamine clematitis
- Cardamine flagellifera
- Cardamine micranthera- small-anther bittercress, found only in Virginia and North Carolina.
- Cardamine rotundifolia
- Carex aestivalis
- Carex austrocaroliniana
- Carex austrolucorum
- Carex biltmoreana
- Carex fraseriana
- Carex fumosimontana
- Carex manhartii
- Carex misera
- Carex radfordi
- Carex roanensis
- Carex ruthii
- Clematis addisoni
- Clematis albicoma
- Clematis coactilis
- Clematis morefieldii
- Clematis terminalis
- Clematis vinacea
- Clematis viticaulis - Millboro leather flower. It is found only in Bath, Augusta, and Rockbridge counties of the U.S. state of Virginia.
- Clethra acuminata- mountain pepperbush.
- Clinopodium talladeganum
- Clintonia umbellulata- white clintonia. It is found in the Appalachian mountains, from as far south as Georgia to as far north as New York.
- Conradina verticillata
- Convallaria pseudomajalis - American lily-of-the-valley. It is found in the Southern Appalachians, in mountain forests at elevations between 700 and 1,500 feet.
- Convolvulus sericatus
- Corallorhiza bentleyi -Bentley's coralroot. It is found only in the mountains of West Virginia and Virginia.
- Coreopsis latifolia
- Crataegus austromontana
- Crataegus buckleyi
- Crataegus pallens
- Cuscuta rostrata
- Dicentra eximia
- Dichanthelium appalachiense
- Diervilla rivularis
- Diervilla sessilifolia
- Diphylleia cymosa
- Draba ramosissima- branched draba or rocktwist. It is found in the central area of the southern Appalachian mountains, mainly on rocky outcrops of limestone or mafic rocks.
- Eriogonum alleni
- Eubotrys recurva- mountain fetterbush. It is common at higher elevations of the southern Appalachian mountains.
- Eutrochium steelei - Appalachian Joe Pye weed.
- Eurybia chlorolepis - Mountain wood aster. It is found in the red spruce-Fraser fir forests of the high elevation Appalachian mountains.
- Eurybia saxicastelli- Rockcastle aster. It is found only in Tennessee and Kentucky.
- Eurybia surculosa
- Galium latifolium
- Gaylussacia orocola
- Gaylussacia ursina
- Gentiana austromontana- Appalachian gentian. It is found only in mountainous areas of West Virginia, Virginia, Tennessee, and North Carolina, with populations in Roan Mountain State Park and Cherokee National Forest.
- Gentiana decora
- Gentiana latidens
- Geocarpon cumberlandensis
- Geum geniculatum
- Geum radiatum
- Glyceria nubigena
- Gymnocarpium appalachianum - Appalachian oakfern.
- Helianthus glaucophyllus
- Heuchera aceroides
- Heuchera alba
- Heuchera villosa
- Hexastylis chueyi
- Hexastylis contracta
- Hexastylis heterophylla
- Hexastylis rhombiformis
- Hexastylis ruthii
- Hexastylis shuttleworthii
- Houstonia montana
- Houstonia serpyllifolia
- Hudsonia montana
- Hydrangea radiata
- Hydrophyllum atranthum
- Hymenophyllum tayloriae
- Hypericum buckleyi
- Hypericum graveolens
- Hypericum mitchelianum
- Ilex collina- Hill Holly or longstalk holly. It is found at high elevations in North Carolina, Virginia, West Virginia, Tennessee, and Georgia.
- Ilex montana
- Iliamna corei
- Isoetes tennesseensis
- Isotrema macrophyllum
- Krigia montana
- Leptogramma burksiorum
- Leucothoe fontanesiana
- Liatris helleri- Heller's blazing star. It grows only on high rocky cliffs and grassy balls of the Blue Ridge Mountains of North Carolina.
- Lilium grayi- Gray's lily.
- Magnolia fraseri
- Marshallia grandiflora (Presumed extinct)
- Marshallia mohrii
- Marshallia pulchra
- Meehania cordata
- Melanthium parviflorum
- Micranthes careyana
- Micranthes caroliniana
- Micranthes micranthidifolia
- Monarda austroappalachiana
- Monarda brevis
- Nabalus cylindricus
- Nabalus roanensis
- Narthecium montanum (presumed extinct in North Carolina)
- Neottia smalli
- Oenothera argillicola
- Oenothera glauca
- Oenothera hybrida
- Orbexilum macrophyllum (possibly extinct)
- Packera antennarifolia
- Packera millefolium
- Packera serpenticola
- Packera schweinitziana
- Paronychia argyrocoma
- Paxistima canbyi
- Penstemon kralii
- Penstemon smallii
- Phacelia fimbriata - fringed phacelia. It is found only in the southern Appalachian mountains, at elevations above 3,500 feet.
- Phlox buckleyi
- Phlox stolonifera
- Pieris floribunda
- Pityopsis ruthii
- Pinus pungens
- Platanthera shriveri
- Platanus occidentalis
- Polymnia johnbeckii
- Pycnanthemum beadlei - Beadle's mountainmint, found only in the Southern Appalachian mountains.
- Pycnanthemum montanum
- Pyrularia pubera
- Ranunculus allegheniensis
- Rhododendron carolinianum
- Rhododendron catawbiense
- Rhododendron cumberlandense
- Rhododendron pilosum
- Rhododendron smokianum
- Rhododendron vaseyi
- Ribes rotundifolium
- Rudbeckia truncata
- Rugelia nudicaulis
- Sagittaria fasciculata
- Sagittaria secundifolia
- Sarracenia jonesii
- Sarracenia oreophila
- Scirpus ancistrochaetus
- Scutellaria montana
- Sedum glaucophyllum
- Sedum nevii
- Shortia brevistyla
- Shortia galacifolia
- Silphium wasiotense
- Sisyrinchium dichotomum
- Spiraea corymbosa
- Spiraea virginiana
- Solidago albopilosa
- Solidago arenicola
- Solidago faucibus
- Solidago curtissii
- Solidago glomerata
- Solidago harrisii
- Solidago lancifolia
- Solidago roanensis
- Solidago simulans
- Solidago spithamaea
- Stachys appalachiana
- Stachys clingmanii
- Stachys eplingii
- Stachys glandulosissima
- Stachys latidens
- Stachys nelsonii
- Stachys subcordata - Blue Ridge hedgenettle.
- Steironema gramineum
- Stenanthium diffusum
- Synandra hispidula
- Symphyotrichum retroflexum
- Symphyotrichum rhiannon
- Symphyotrichum schistosum
- Taenidia montana - mountain parsley. It is found only in the mountains of Pennsylvania, Virginia, West Virginia, and Maryland.
- Thalictrum clavatum
- Thalictrum coriaceum
- Thalictrum hepaticum
- Thermopsis fraxinifolia
- Thermopsis villosa
- Tiarella austrina
- Tiarella nautila
- Trautvetteria fonticalcarea
- Trillium georgianum
- Trillium persistens
- Trillium simile
- Trillium tennesseense
- Tsuga caroliniana
- Vaccinium altomontanum- Blue Ridge blueberry. It is found strictly in the high elevations of the Appalachian mountains in a narrow range.
- Vaccinium erythrocarpum
- Vaccinium hirsutum
- Vaccinium simulatum
- Viburnum alabamense
- Viola appalachiensis - Appalachian violet.
- Viola monacanora
- Viola tenuisecta
- Vittaria appalachiana
- Xyris spathifolia
