= Creeping mint =

Creeping mint is a common name for several plants and may refer to:

- Meehania cordata, native to the eastern United States
- Mentha satureioides, native to Australia
