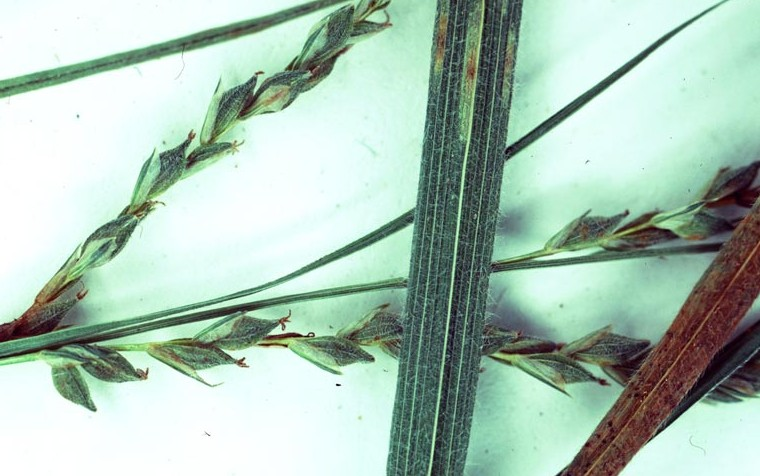

Conservation status
- Vulnerable (NatureServe)

Scientific classification
- Kingdom: Plantae
- Clade: Embryophytes
- Clade: Tracheophytes
- Clade: Angiosperms
- Clade: Monocots
- Clade: Commelinids
- Order: Poales
- Family: Cyperaceae
- Genus: Carex
- Subgenus: Carex subg. Carex
- Section: Carex sect. Hymenochlaenae
- Species: C. roanensis

Binomial name
- Carex roanensis F.J.Herm.

= Carex roanensis =

Species of grass-like plant

Carex roanensis is a species of sedge known by the common name Roan Mountain sedge. It is endemic to the eastern United States, where it can be found in the Blue Ridge, Ridge and Valley, and Central Appalachian ecoregions. It was first collected on Roan Mountain in Tennessee in 1936. It was not collected again for fifty years. Now it is known from Georgia, Kentucky, North Carolina, Pennsylvania, Tennessee, Virginia, and West Virginia.

This plant forms small clumps of stems up to 85 centimeters tall. The stem bases and leaf sheaths are tinged maroon. The leaf blades are hairy. The inflorescence contains a terminal spike and two to three lateral spikes. There has been some question as to whether this plant is a true species, or perhaps a hybrid. Genetic analysis confirms that it is a species in its own right.

This plant grows in forests at moderate or higher elevations, sometimes in wooded areas but more often in the open. It may grow alongside the similar Carex species C. aestivalis and C. virescens.
