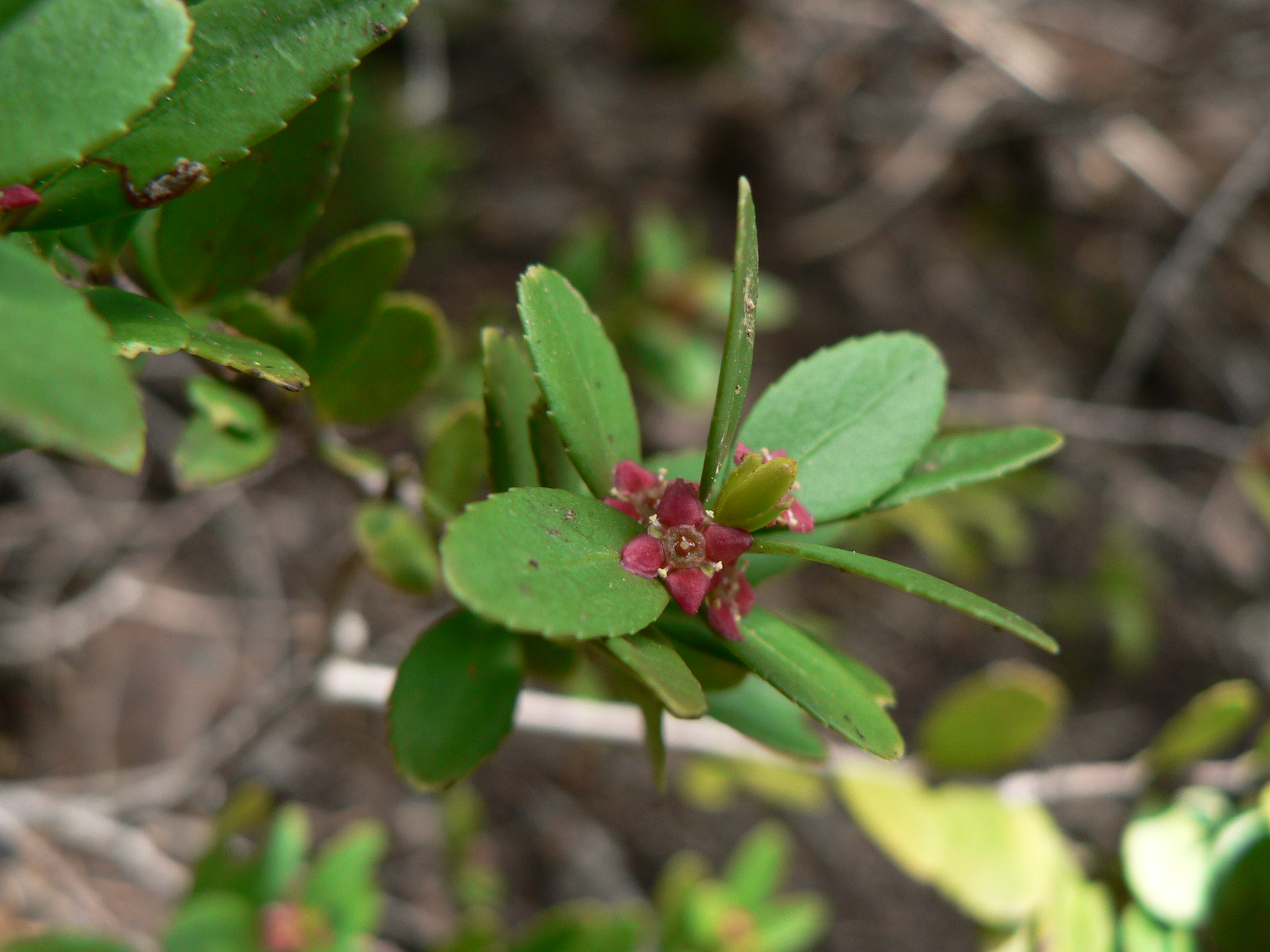
- Paxistima myrsinites

Scientific classification
- Kingdom: Plantae
- Clade: Tracheophytes
- Clade: Angiosperms
- Clade: Eudicots
- Clade: Rosids
- Order: Celastrales
- Family: Celastraceae
- Genus: Paxistima; Raf.

Species
- 2 (see text)

Synonyms
- Oreophila Nutt.; Pachistima Raf.

= Paxistima =

Genus of shrubs

Paxistima is a small genus of shrubs in the family Celastraceae containing two North American species.

- Paxistima canbyi (Canby's mountain-lover) is an uncommon shrub native to the Appalachians and surrounding areas in the United States.
- Paxistima myrsinites (Oregon boxleaf) is widespread across western North America.
