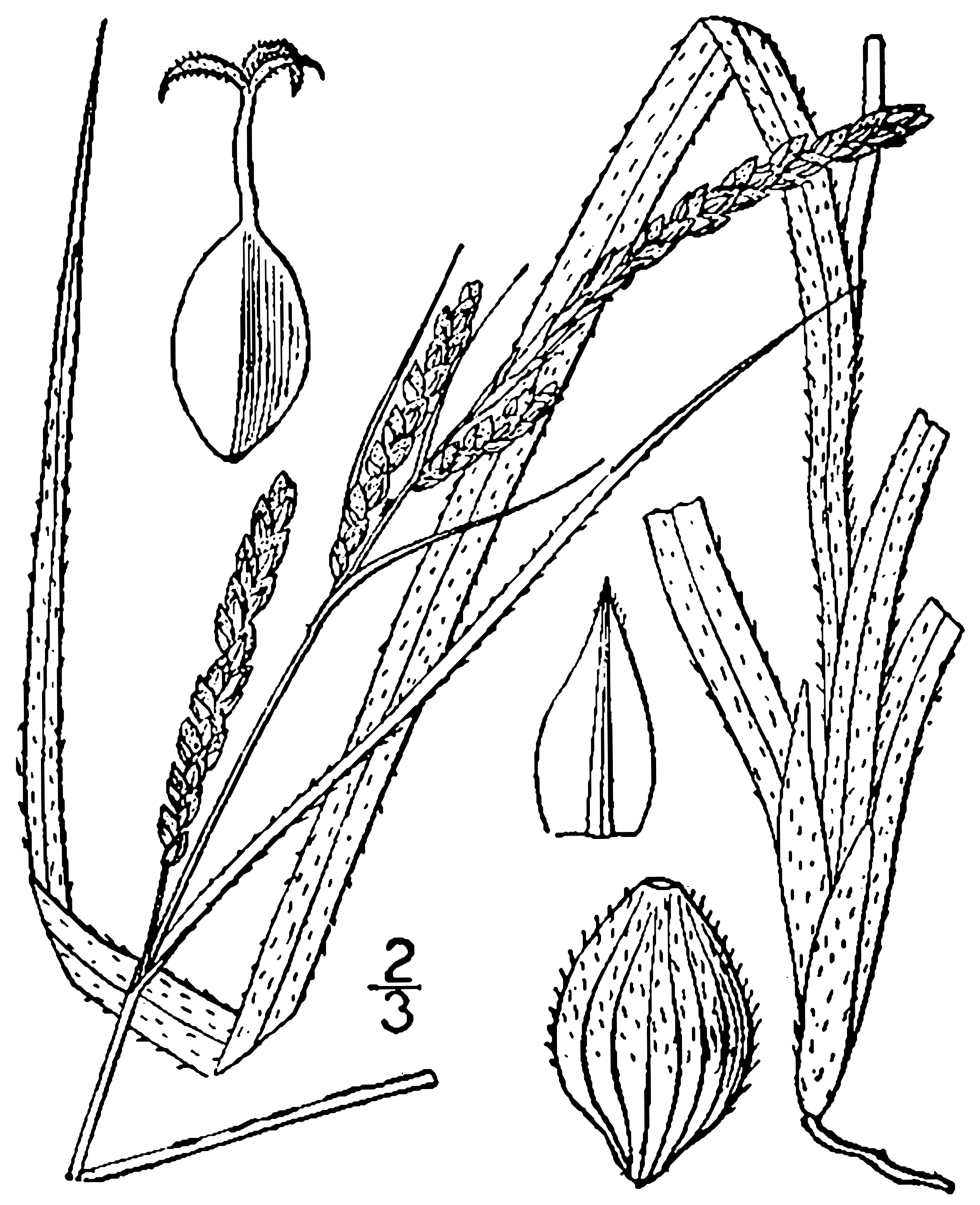
- Botanical illustration

Scientific classification
- Kingdom: Plantae
- Clade: Tracheophytes
- Clade: Angiosperms
- Clade: Monocots
- Clade: Commelinids
- Order: Poales
- Family: Cyperaceae
- Genus: Carex
- Species: C. virescens

Binomial name
- Carex virescens Muhl. ex Willd.

Synonyms
- Carex costata Schwein.; Carex virescens var. costata Dewey; Carex virescens var. enormis Farw.; Olamblis virescens (Muhl. ex Willd.) Raf.

= Carex virescens =

Species of grass-like plant

Carex virescens, the ribbed sedge, is a species of flowering plant in the family Cyperaceae, native to eastern North America. It strongly resembles and has nearly the same range as Carex swanii.

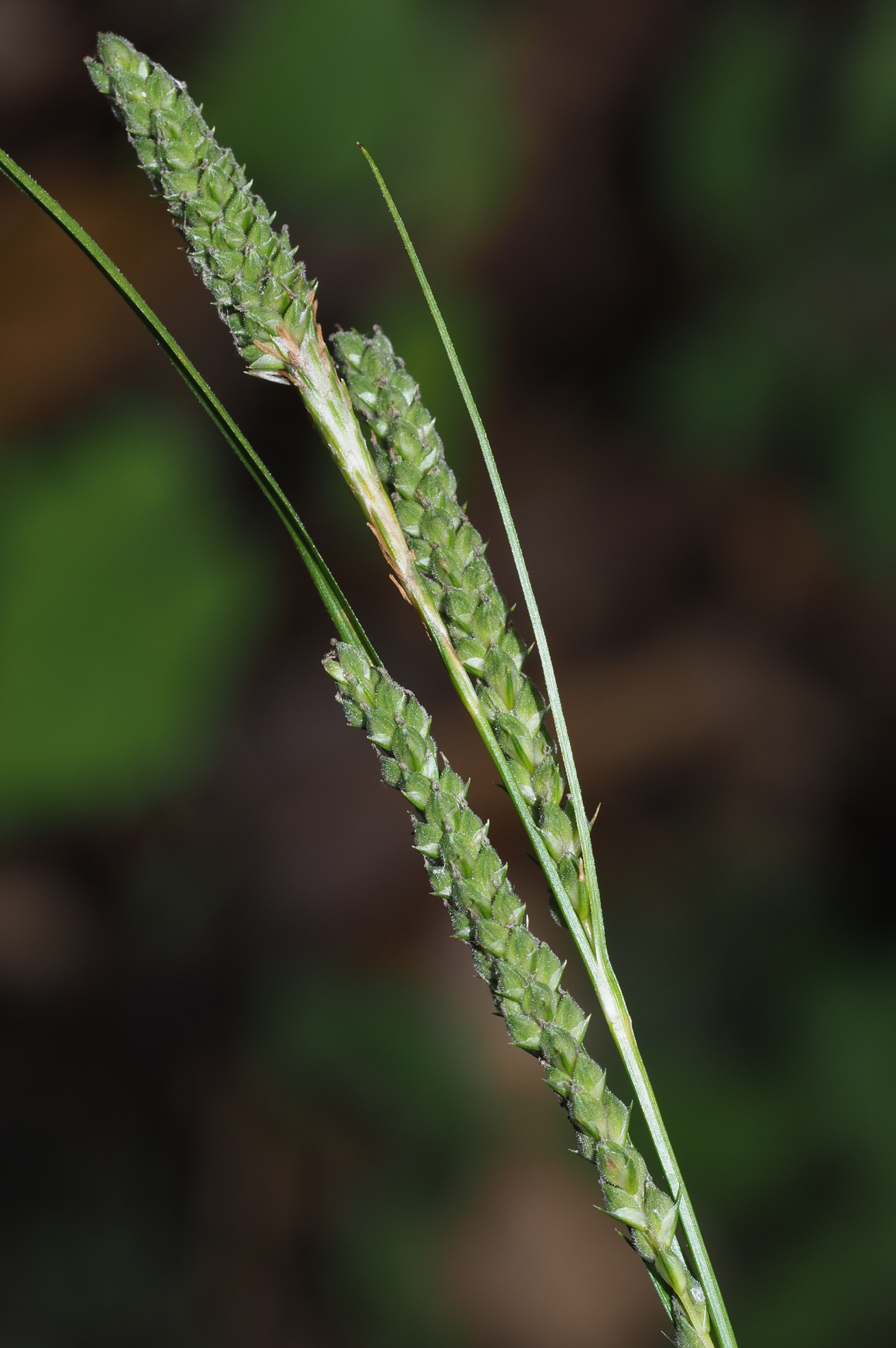
Inflorescence
