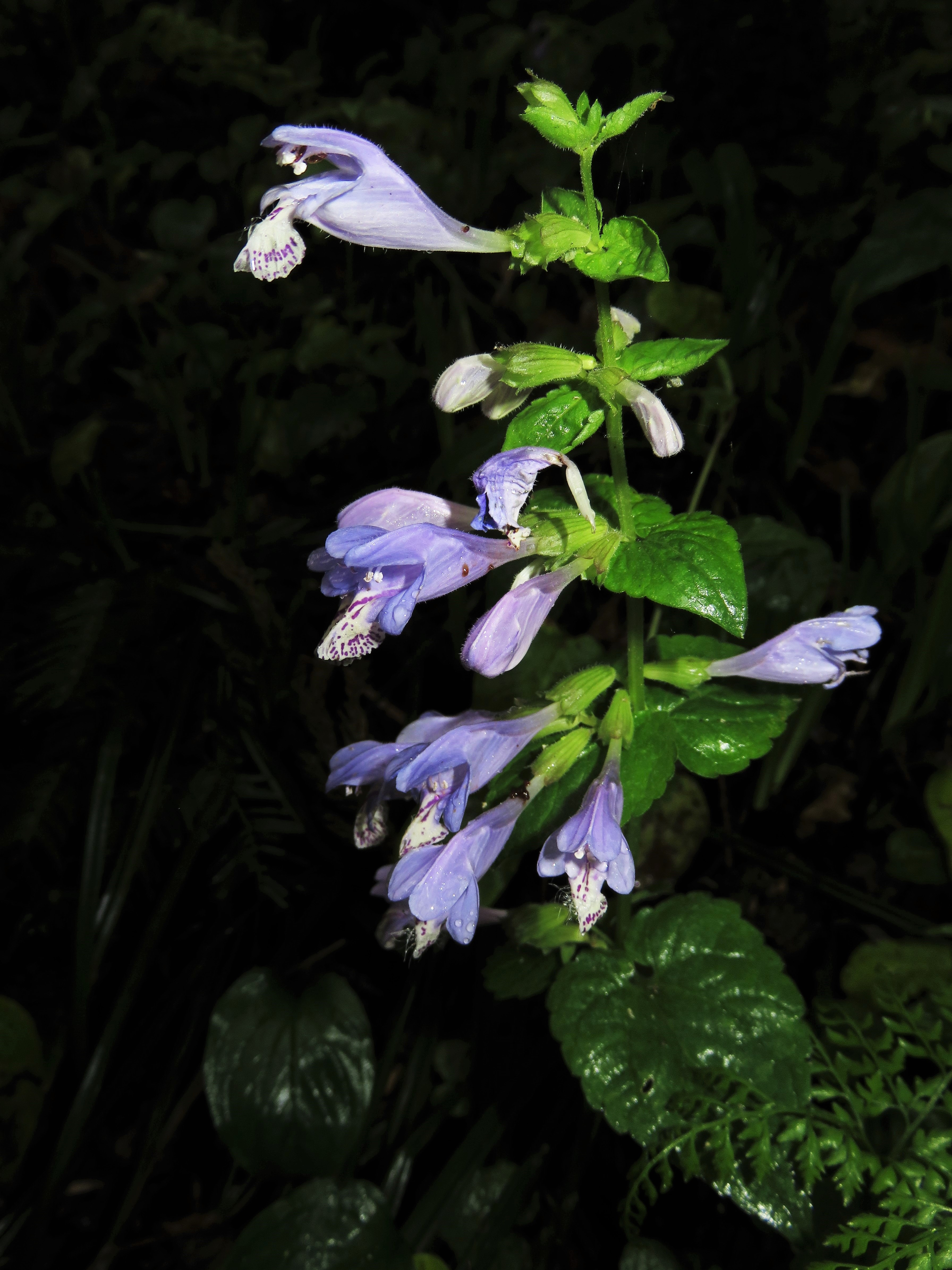
- Meehania urticifolia

Scientific classification
- Kingdom: Plantae
- Clade: Tracheophytes
- Clade: Angiosperms
- Clade: Eudicots
- Clade: Asterids
- Order: Lamiales
- Family: Lamiaceae
- Subfamily: Nepetoideae
- Tribe: Mentheae
- Genus: Meehania; Britton

= Meehania =

Genus of flowering plants

Meehania is a genus of flowering plants in the family Lamiaceae, first described in 1894. It is native to China, Japan, and the eastern United States.

Species

1. Meehania cordata (Nutt.) Britton - Appalachian Mountains of eastern United States (Tennessee, North Carolina, Kentucky, Virginia, West Virginia, Pennsylvania, Ohio)
2. Meehania faberi (Hemsl.) C.Y.Wu - Gansu, Sichuan
3. Meehania fargesii (H.Lév.) C.Y.Wu - Guangdong, Guangxi, Guizhou, Hubei, Hunan, Jiangxi, Sichuan, Yunnan, Zhejiang
4. Meehania henryi (Hemsl.) Y.Z.Sun ex C.Y.Wu - Guizhou, Hubei, Hunan, Sichuan
5. Meehania montis-koyae Ohwi - Honshu, Fujian, Zhejiang
6. Meehania pinfaensis (H.Lév.) Y.Z.Sun ex C.Y.Wu - Guizhou
7. Meehania urticifolia (Miq.) Makino - Japan, Korea, Russian Far East, Jilin, Liaoning
