= Elsie Quarterman =

American plant ecologist (1910–2014)

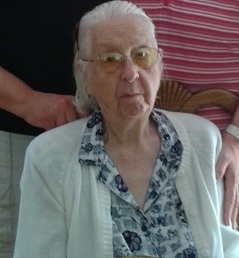
Quarterman in 2012

Elsie Quarterman (November 28, 1910 – June 9, 2014) was a prominent plant ecologist. She was a professor emerita at Vanderbilt University.

Quarterman was born on November 28, 1910, in Valdosta, Georgia. She earned a B.A. from Georgia State Women's College (now Valdosta State University) in 1932 and earned an M.A. in botany from Duke University in 1943. She completed her PhD at Duke University in 1949 with Henry J. Oosting. During her graduate work and afterward, she also collaborated extensively with Catherine Keever.

Quarterman is best known for her work on the ecology of Tennessee cedar glades. These herb-dominated plant communities on the shallow soils of limestone outcrops are globally rare habitats and contain many endemic plant species. She is also credited with rediscovering the native Tennessee coneflower, Echinacea tennesseensis, which was thought to be extinct, in 1969. Conservation efforts for the coneflower were successful, and it was delisted as an endangered species in 2011.

She supervised seven doctoral students, including Stewart Ware, a plant ecologist at the College of William and Mary, and Carol and Jerry Baskin, professors at the University of Kentucky.

== Death ==
She died on June 9, 2014, aged 103, in Nashville.

== Honors ==
Quarterman became the first woman department chair at Vanderbilt when she chaired the Biology Department in 1964.

The Tennessee Academy of Science honored Quarterman with the 2003 Distinguished College/University Scientist Award.

The Southeastern Chapter of the Ecological Society of America gives an annual Quarterman-Keever Award to the best student poster in ecology. The Elsie Quarterman Cedar Glade, a 185-acre (0.75 km^{2}) natural area that is part of the U.S. Army Corps of Engineers Percy Priest Reservoir and Wildlife Management Area near La Vergne, Tennessee, is named in her honor.

In 2008, an annual spring wildflower event at Cedars of Lebanon State Park, celebrated annually for over 30 years, was renamed the Elsie Quarterman Wildflower Weekend.

== Selected works ==
- Quarterman, Elsie. 1950. Major plant communities of Tennessee cedar glades. Ecology 31: 234–254.
- Quarterman, Elsie. 1957. Early Plant Succession on Abandoned Cropland in the Central Basin of Tennessee. Ecology 38: 300–309.
- Quarterman, Elsie, and Catherine Keever. 1962. Southern mixed hardwood forest: climax in the southeastern Coastal Plain. Ecological Monographs 32: 167–185.
- Quarterman, Elsie, Barbara Holman Turner, and Thomas E. Hemmerly. 1972. Analysis of virgin mixed mesophytic forests in Savage Gulf, Tennessee. Bulletin of the Torrey Botanical Club 99: 228–232.
- Quarterman, Elsie and Richard L. Powell. 1978. Potential ecological/geological natural landmarks on the interior low plateaus. National Park Service. Interagency Resource Management Division.
