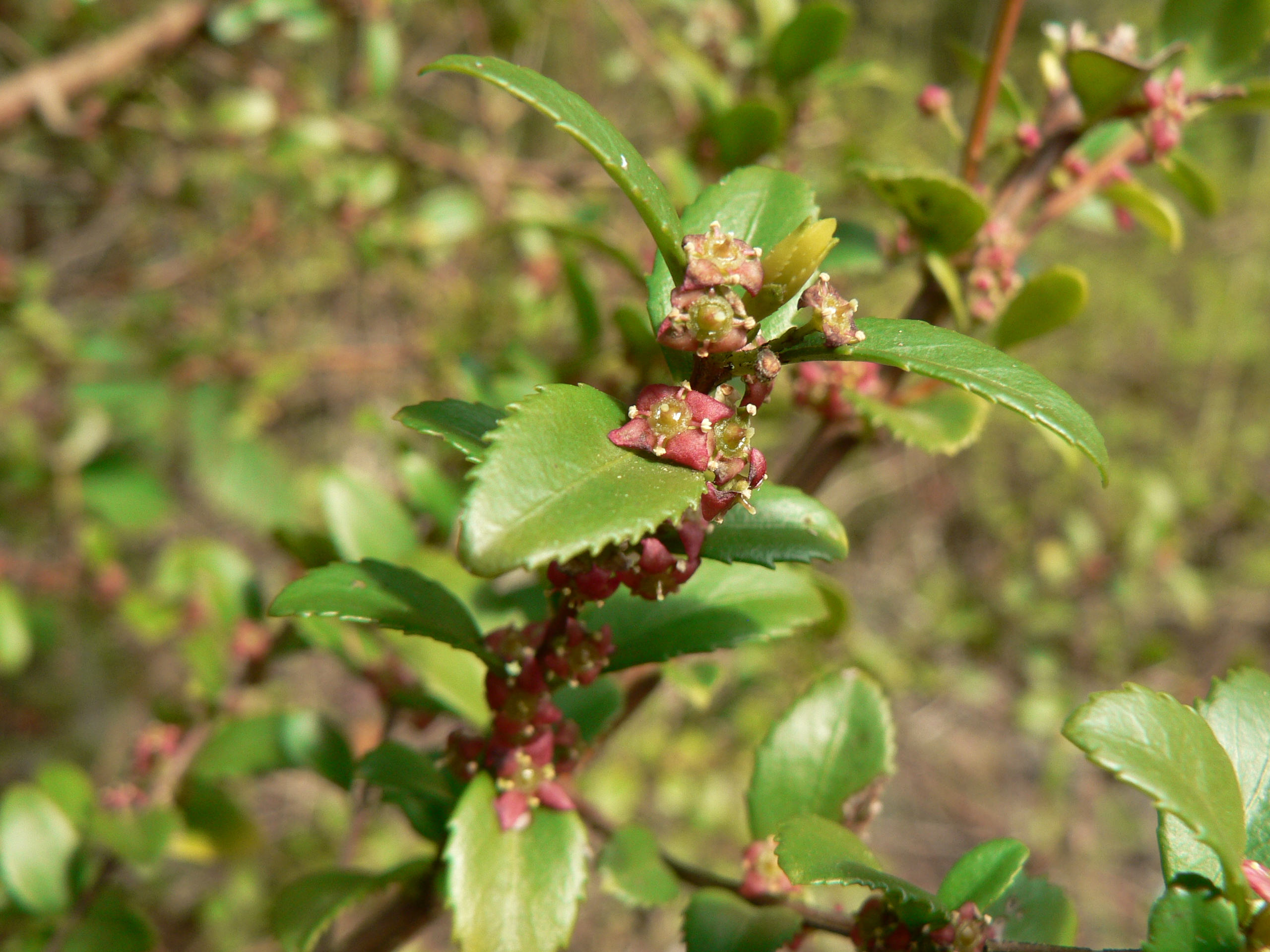

Conservation status
- Apparently Secure (NatureServe)

Scientific classification
- Kingdom: Plantae
- Clade: Tracheophytes
- Clade: Angiosperms
- Clade: Eudicots
- Clade: Rosids
- Order: Celastrales
- Family: Celastraceae
- Genus: Paxistima
- Species: P. myrsinites

Binomial name
- Paxistima myrsinites (Pursh) Raf.

= Paxistima myrsinites =

Species of flowering plant

Paxistima myrsinites (Oregon boxleaf, Oregon boxwood, mountain lover, box, or hedge, false box, myrtle box leaf; syn. Pachistima myrsinites) is a species of shrub in the family Celastraceae. It is native to western North America from British Columbia south to northern Mexico and east to the Rocky Mountains, where it grows in forests, often in the understory.

== Description ==
Paxistima myrsinites is a low prostrate or spreading evergreen shrub growing to 1 metre (3 ft 3 in) in maximum height. The stems have many four-angled branches lined with oppositely arranged oval leaves roughly 1–3 centimetres (0.39–1.18 in) long. The leaves are thick, leathery, toothed, and pointed or round-tipped. They are light green when new and shiny dark green when mature. Blossoming occurs from June to August. The inflorescences occur in the leaf axils, where there appears a single flower or cluster of up to three. The small flat flower has four dark red oval petals about a 1 millimetre (0.039 in) long. The fruit is an oblong capsule under 1 centimetre (0.39 in) long containing usually one seed in each of its two valves. The seed is dark and shiny and partly covered in a white aril. The shrub reproduces via seed, but it can also be propagated with cuttings.

== Ecology ==
The wild shrub is a good food source for wild animals such as elk and moose, which browse its evergreen leaves in the winter, as well as grouse.

== Uses ==
Paxistima myrsinites has been utilized by Native American groups for various medicinal and ceremonial uses.
