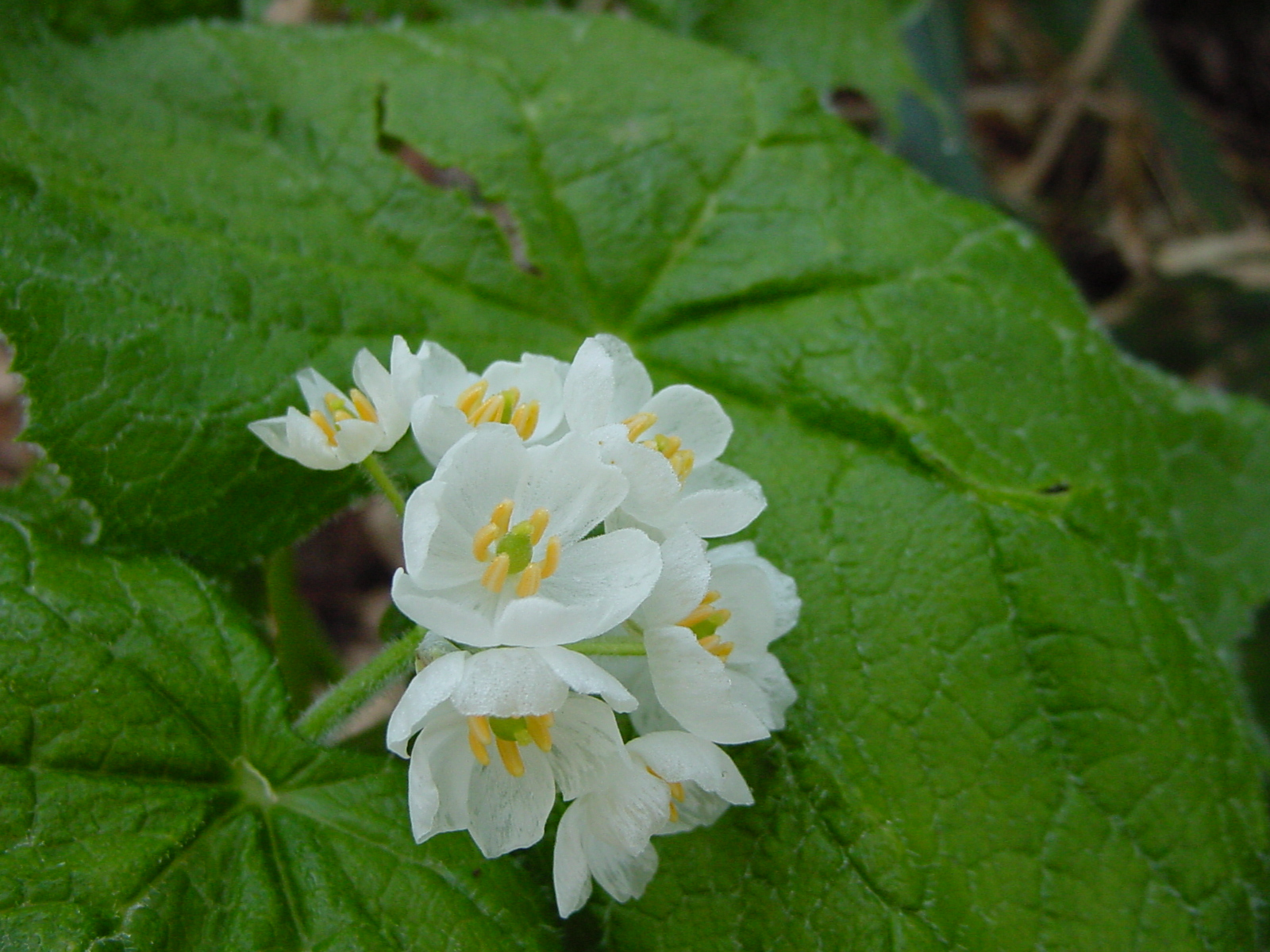

Scientific classification
- Kingdom: Plantae
- Clade: Tracheophytes
- Clade: Angiosperms
- Clade: Eudicots
- Order: Ranunculales
- Family: Berberidaceae
- Genus: Diphylleia
- Species: D. grayi

Binomial name
- Diphylleia grayi F.Schmidt

= Diphylleia grayi =

Skeleton flower

Species of flowering plant

Diphylleia grayi, also known as the skeleton flower, is a species of perennial plant in the family Berberidaceae. It is native to northern and central Japan.

Other regions and languages have common names for this plant; In Japan, it is commonly referred to as Japanese: サンカヨウ, romanized: sankayō, lit. 'lotus of mountain'. In China, it is commonly referred to as Chinese: 冰莲, romanized: bīng lián, lit. 'ice lotus'.

== Description ==
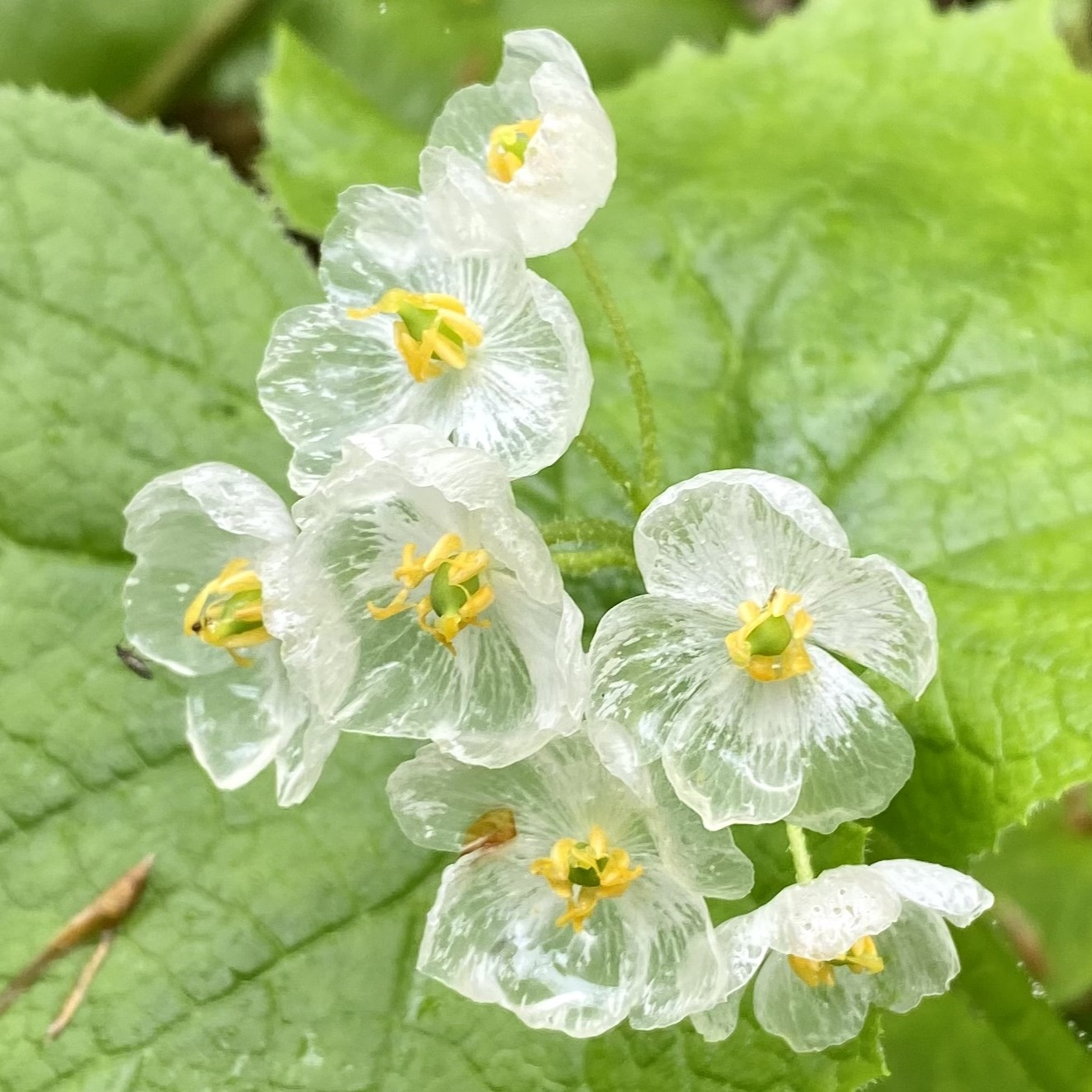
Wet flowers with transparent petals

The plant grows up to 0.4 m (1.3 ft). The flowers are white, pedicellate, with six obovate petals and bloom from May to July. After it flowers, it bears dark blue/purple fruit with a white powdery coating from June to August. Its stems are terete and grow 30–60 cm (12–24 in) long. Its rhizomes are stout and knotty. The plant is known to have petals that become transparent when in contact with water, giving it its common name. After they dry, the petals return to their white coloration.

== Distribution and habitat ==
The plant is distributed from north to central Honshu, Hokkaido, Mount Daisen, and Sakhalin. It grows in slightly moist places in the woods of high mountains.

== Medical uses ==
In the 1960s, botanist Yanagi Kimura discovered that D. grayi crude extracts contain substances similar to but more powerful than podophyllin and colchicine. The extract had anti-tumor effects on transplantable animal tumors.

== Gallery ==
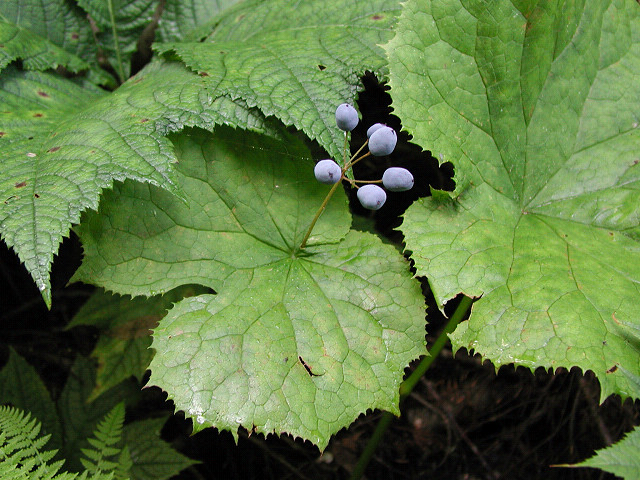
Fruit

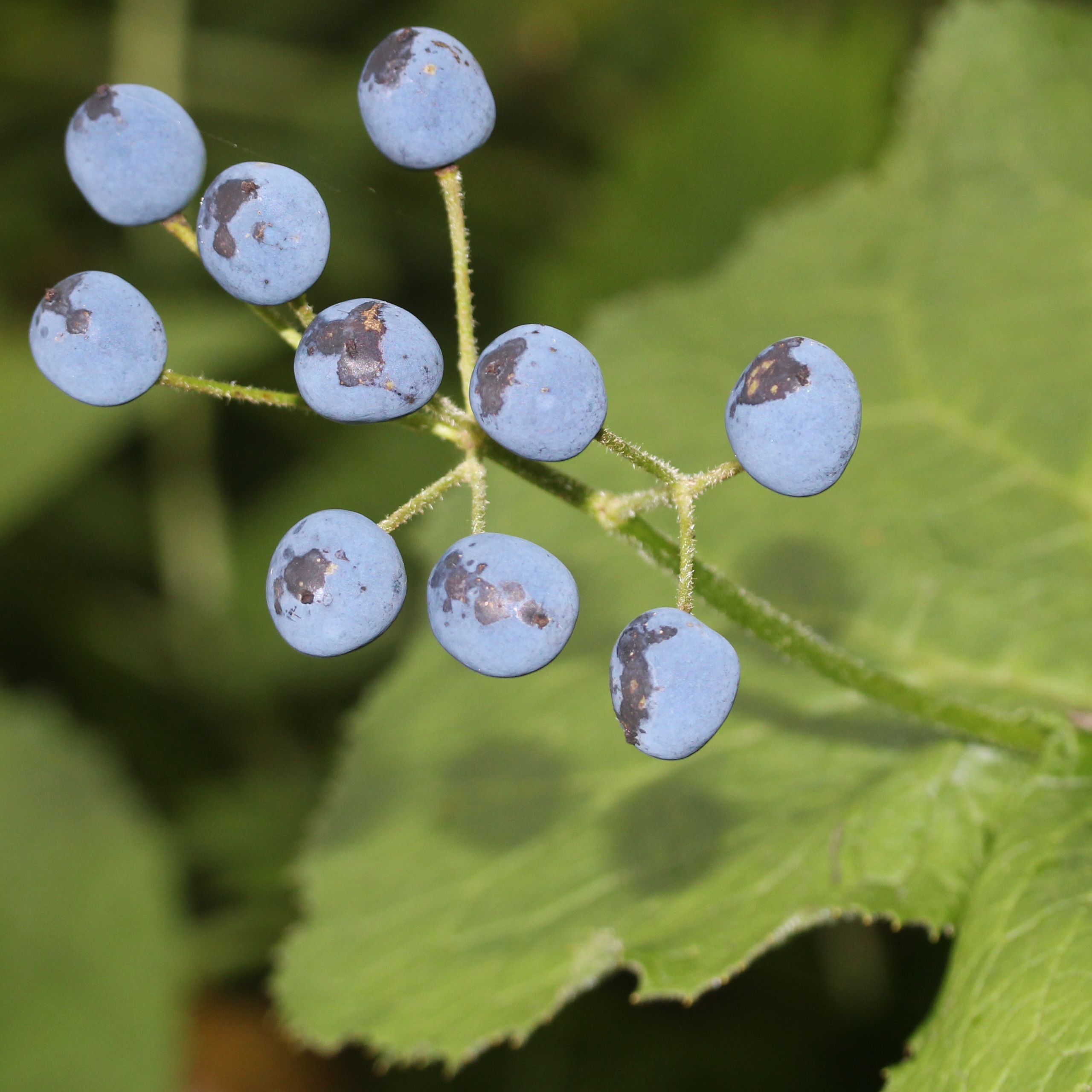
Close-up of fruit

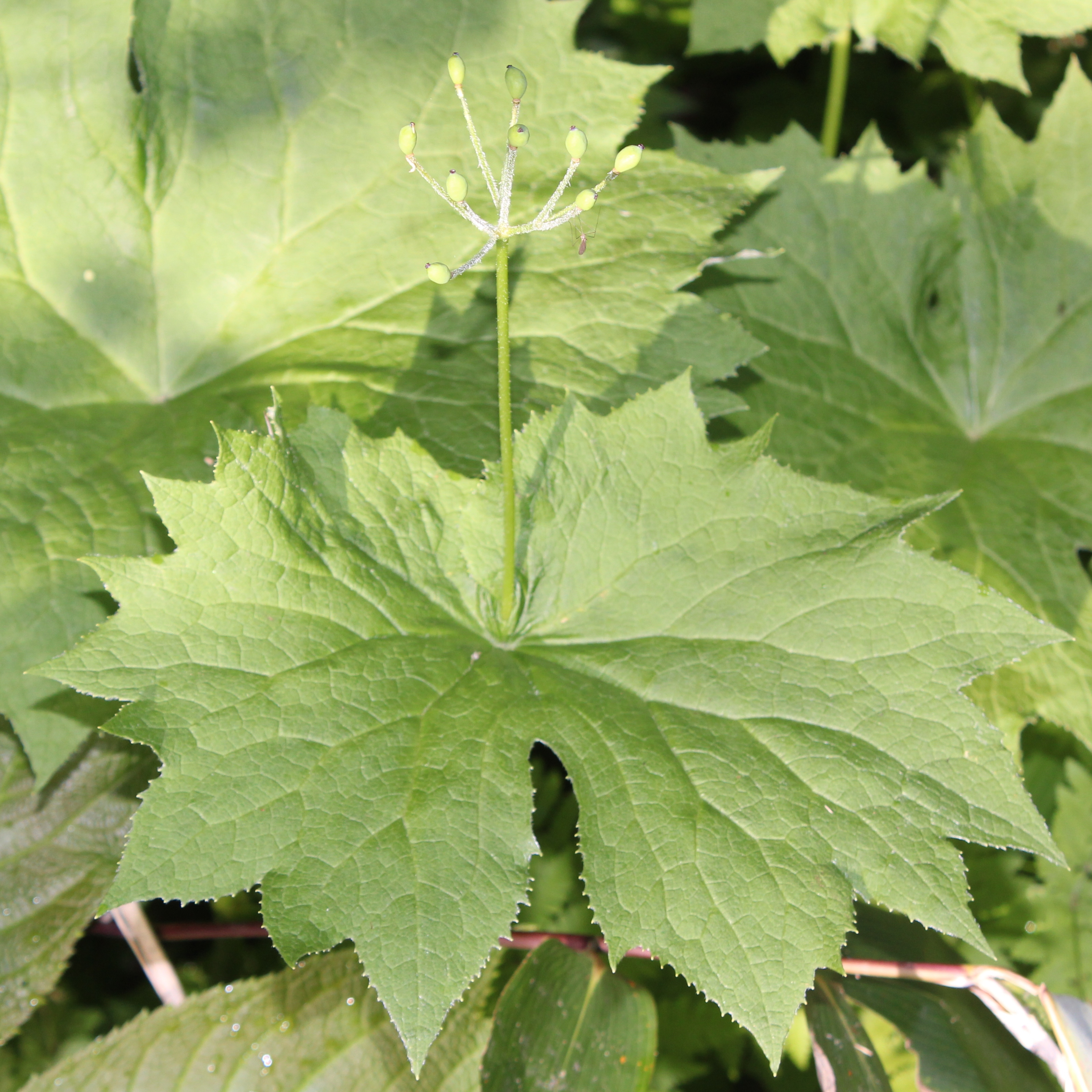
Young fruits

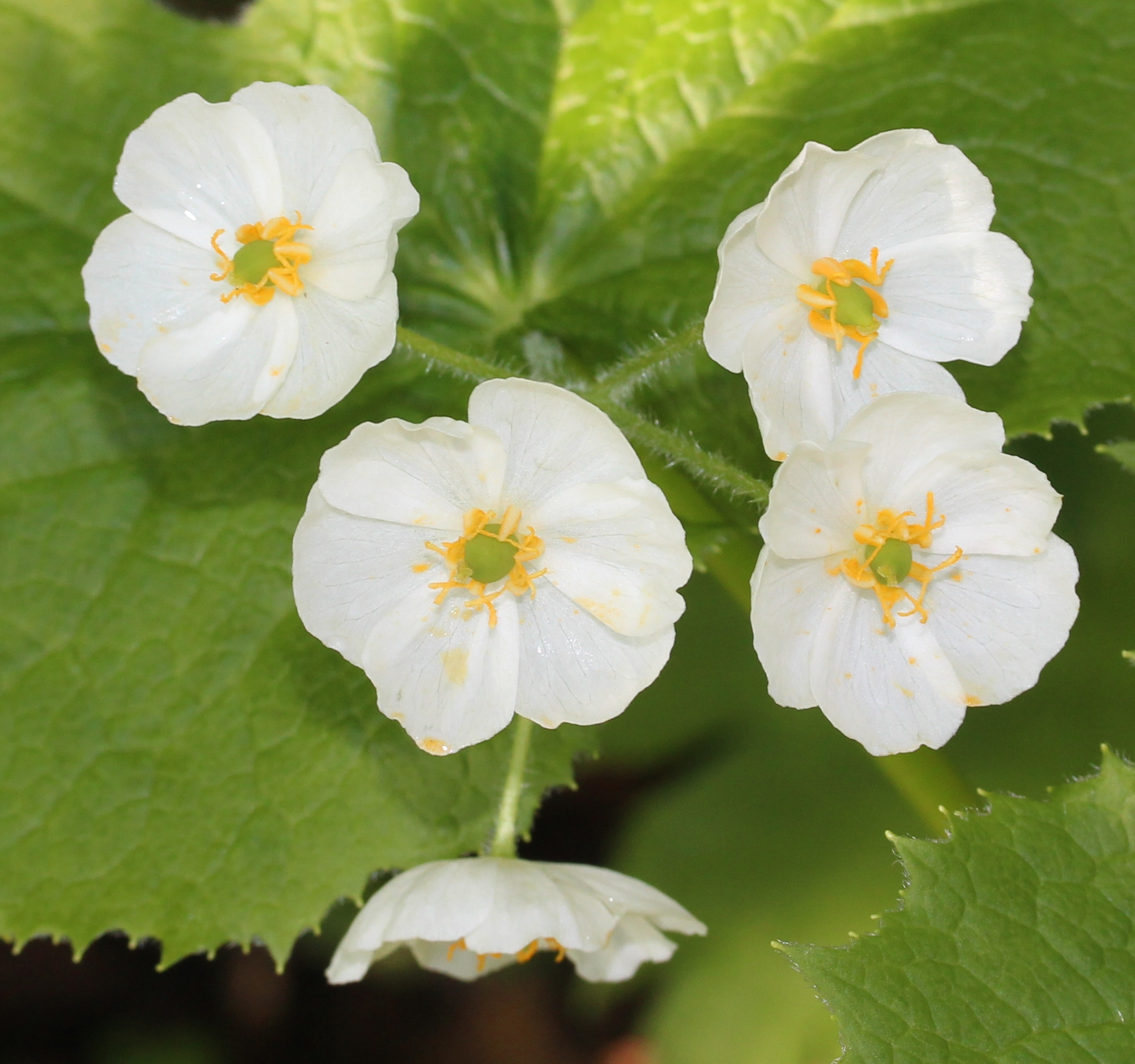
Flowers

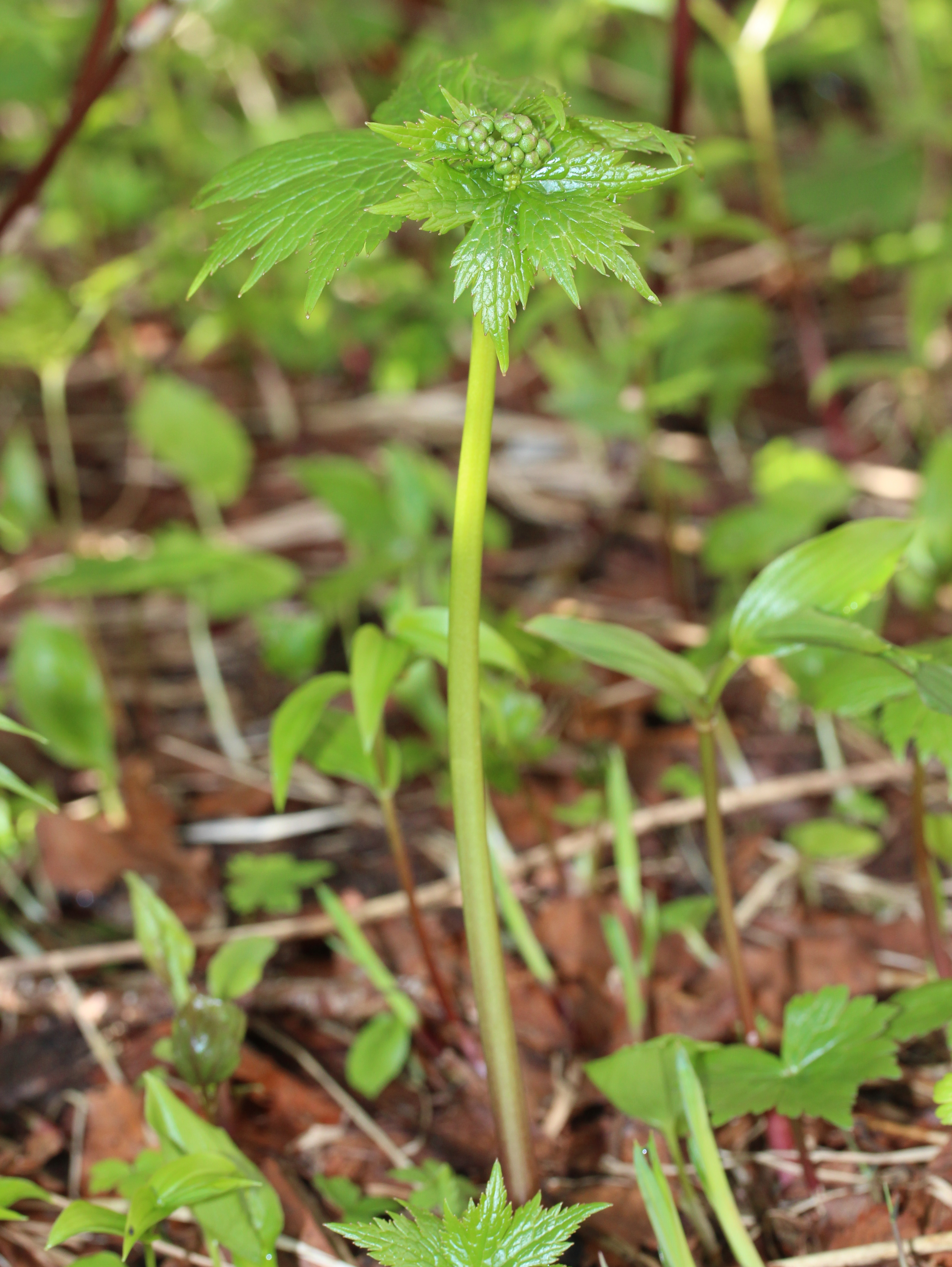
Bud

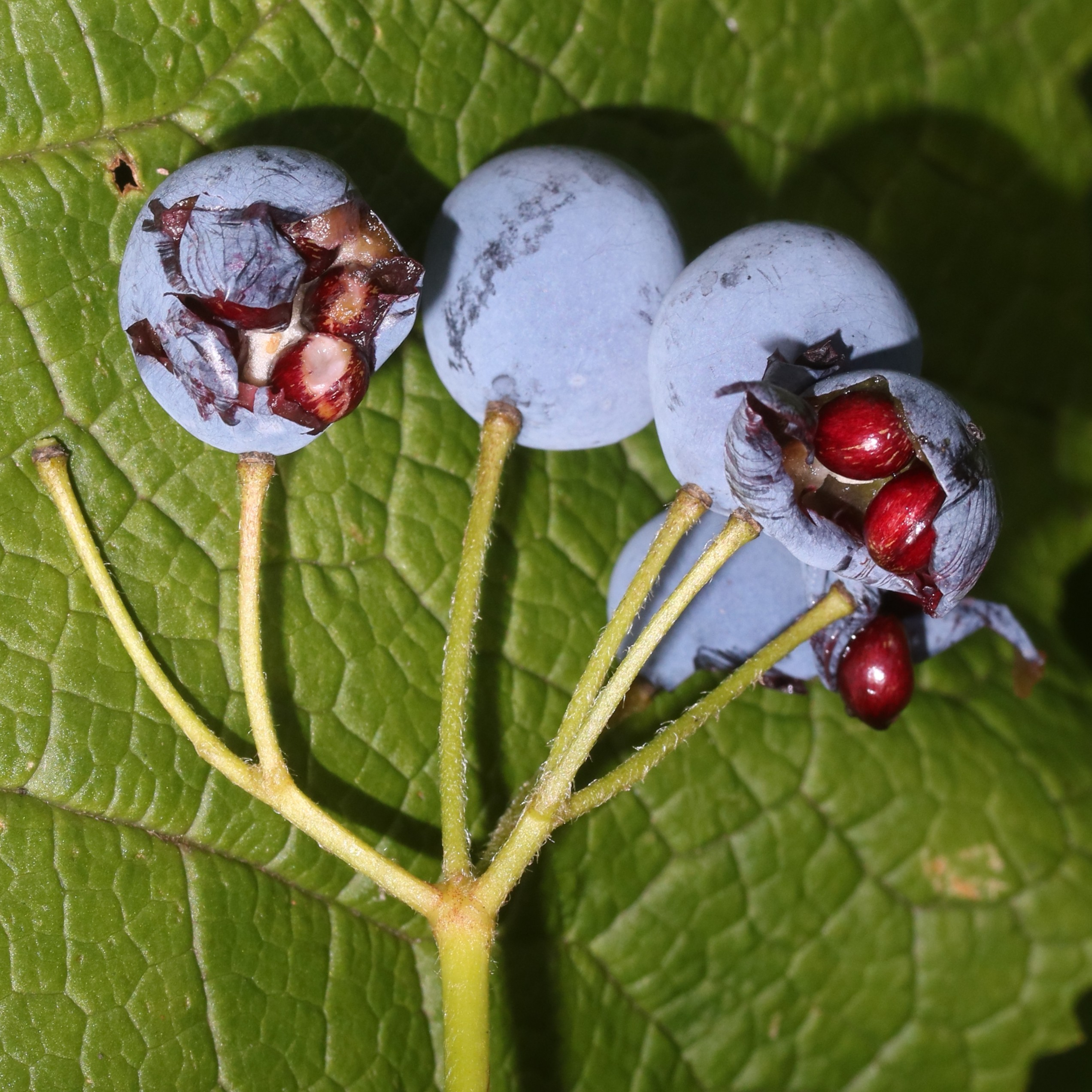
Seeds in a split fruit

== See also ==
- Gymnosiphon suaveolens
