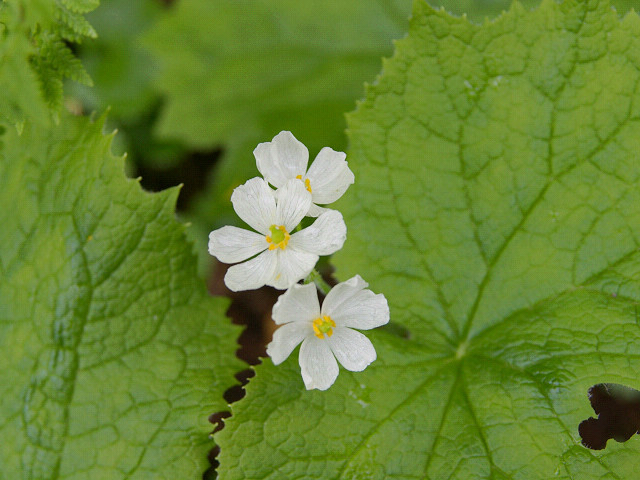

Scientific classification
- Kingdom: Plantae
- Clade: Tracheophytes
- Clade: Angiosperms
- Clade: Eudicots
- Order: Ranunculales
- Family: Berberidaceae
- Genus: Diphylleia; Michx.

= Diphylleia (plant) =

Genus of flowering plants belonging to the barberry family

Diphylleia is a group of large herbs in the family Berberidaceae described as a genus in 1803. It is native to the eastern United States and eastern Asia.

Diphylleia grayi, also known as the skeleton flower, has white petals that turn translucent with rain. When dry, they revert to white.

== Species ==
The following species are recognised by World Flora Online:

- Diphylleia cymosa Michx. - southern Appalachians from SW Virginia to NW Georgia
- Diphylleia grayi F.Schmidt - Cape Sōya in northern Japan
- Diphylleia sinensis H.L.Li - China (Gansu, Hubei, Shaanxi, Sichuan, Yunnan)
