= Allium keeverae =

Scientific classification
- Kingdom: Plantae
- Clade: Tracheophytes
- Clade: Angiosperms
- Clade: Monocots
- Order: Asparagales
- Family: Amaryllidaceae
- Subfamily: Allioideae
- Genus: Allium
- Species: A. keeverae

Binomial name
- Allium keeverae D.B.Poind., Weakley & P.J.Williams

Species of plant

Allium keeverae, Keever's onion, is a species of flowering plant in the family Amaryllidaceae, native to North Carolina. There it is only found growing in the Brushy Mountains of Alexander and Wilkes counties, on the thin soil that forms near granite outcrops.
