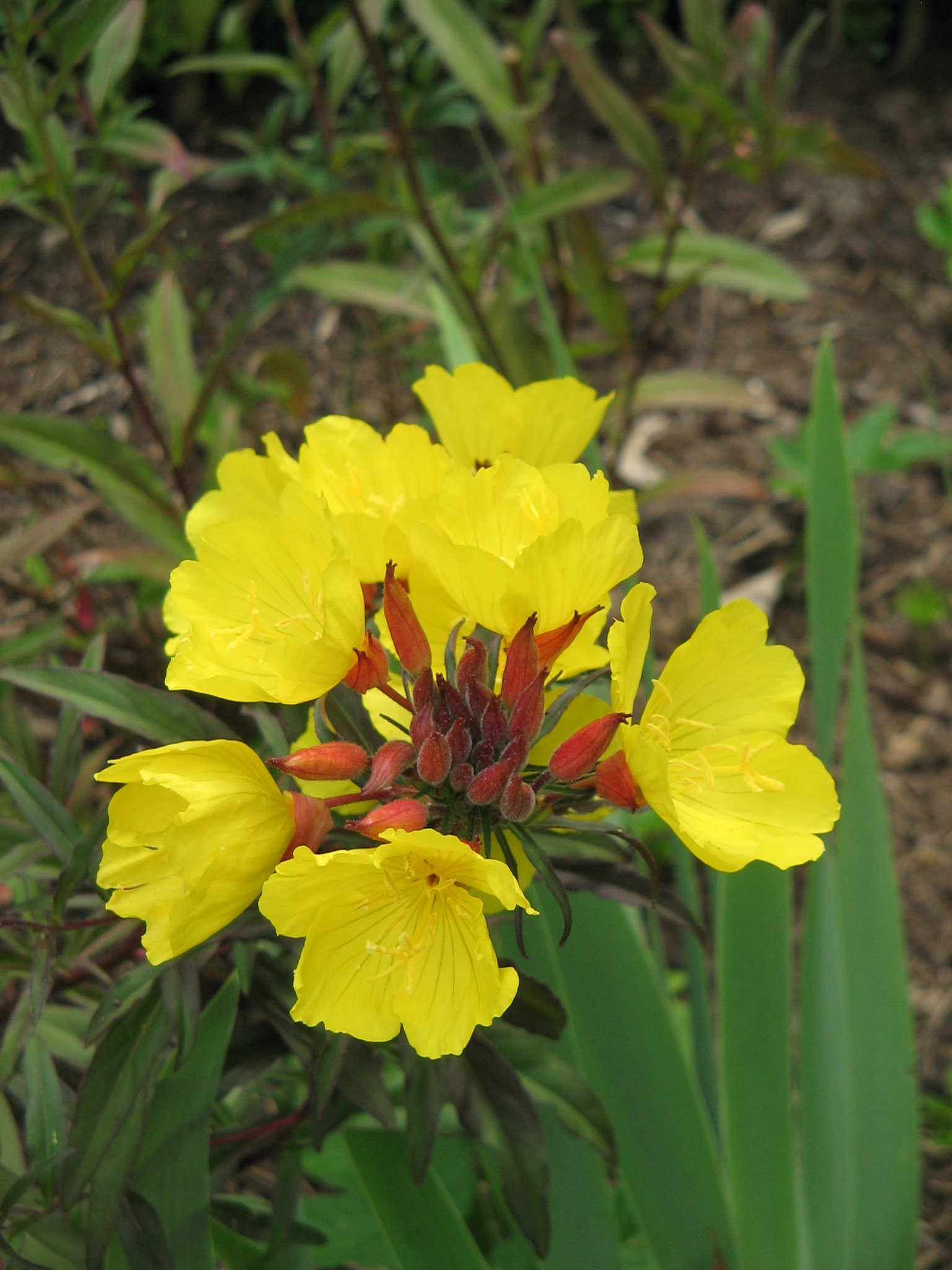
- Flowers
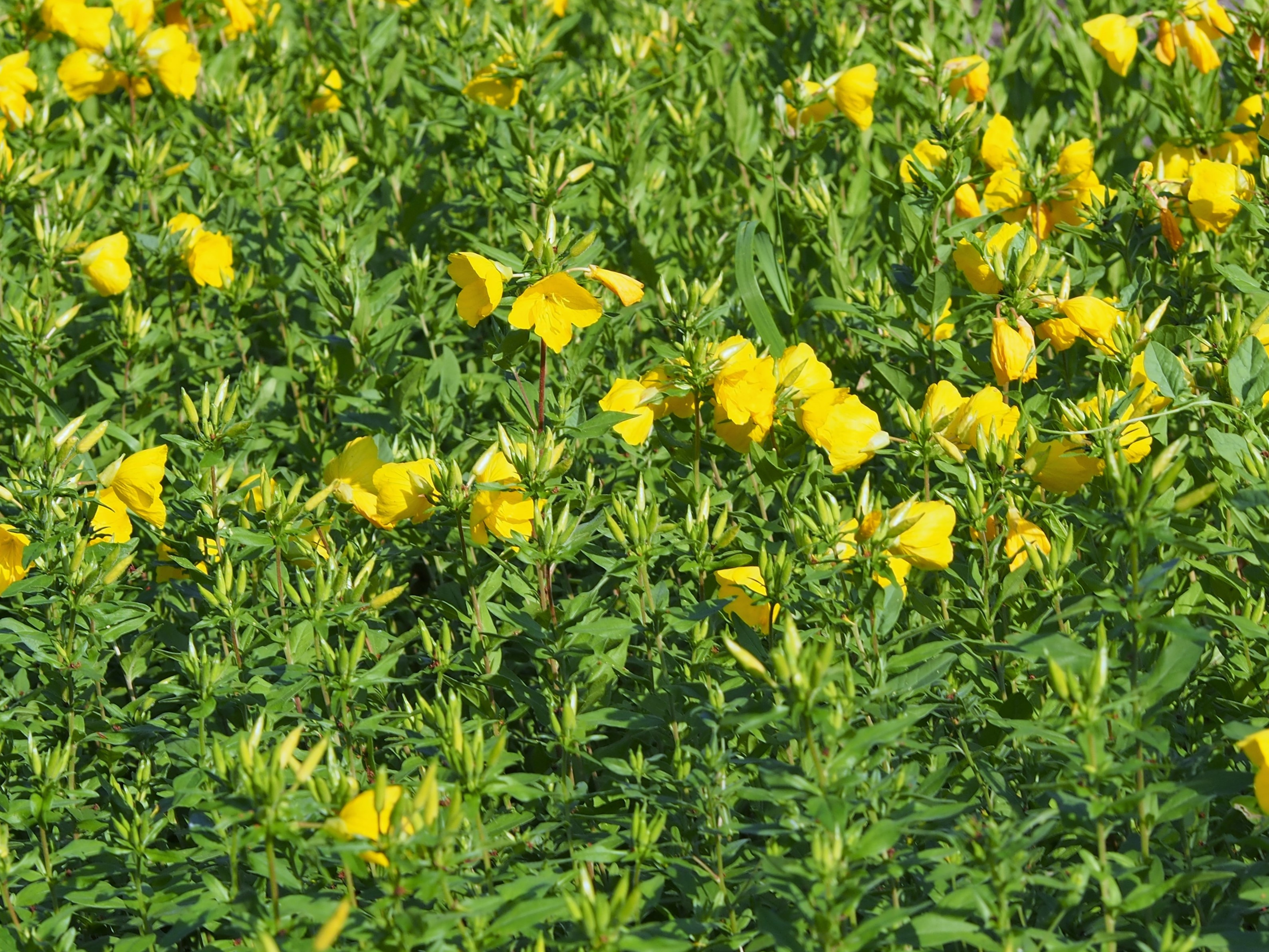
- At the University of Wrocław Botanical Garden

Scientific classification
- Kingdom: Plantae
- Clade: Embryophytes
- Clade: Tracheophytes
- Clade: Angiosperms
- Clade: Eudicots
- Clade: Rosids
- Order: Myrtales
- Family: Onagraceae
- Genus: Oenothera
- Species: O. tetragona

Binomial name
- Oenothera tetragona Roth

Synonyms
- List: Kneiffia fraseri Spach; Kneiffia glauca (Michx.) Spach; Kneiffia latifolia Rydb.; Kneiffia serotina (Lehm.) Bartl.; Kneiffia tetragona (Roth) Pennell; Kneiffia tetragona var. hybrida (Michx.) Pennell; Oenothera ambigua (Nutt.) Spreng.; Oenothera canadensis Goldie; Oenothera fraseri Pursh; Oenothera fruticosa var. ambigua Nutt.; Oenothera fruticosa var. differta Millsp.; Oenothera fruticosa var. fraseri (Pursh) Hook.; Oenothera fruticosa var. glauca (Michx.) H.Lév.; Oenothera fruticosa subsp. glauca (Michx.) Straley; Oenothera fruticosa var. incana (Nutt.) Hook.; Oenothera fruticosa f. incana (Nutt.) Voss; Oenothera fruticosa var. maculata H.Lév.; Oenothera fruticosa subsp. tetragona (Roth) W.L.Wagner; Oenothera glauca Michx.; Oenothera glauca var. fraseri (Pursh) Torr. & A.Gray; Oenothera glauca f. fraseri (Pursh) Voss; Oenothera hybrida Michx.; Oenothera hybrida var. ambigua (Nutt.) S.F.Blake; Oenothera incana Nutt.; Oenothera serotina Lehm.; Oenothera tetragona var. fraseri (Pursh) Munz; Oenothera tetragona subsp. glauca (Michx.) Munz; Oenothera tetragona var. hybrida (Michx.) Fernald; Oenothera tetragona f. hybrida (Michx.) Munz; Oenothera tetragona var. typica Munz

= Oenothera tetragona =

Species of flowering plant

Oenothera tetragona, the glaucous evening primrose, is a species of flowering plant in the family Onagraceae, native to eastern North America, and introduced to Germany, the Czech Republic, and Myanmar. The Royal Horticultural Society considers it a good plant to attract pollinators. There is a cultivar, 'Glaber', also known as 'Clarence Elliott'.
