= Carex misera =

Scientific classification
- Kingdom: Plantae
- Clade: Tracheophytes
- Clade: Angiosperms
- Clade: Monocots
- Clade: Commelinids
- Order: Poales
- Family: Cyperaceae
- Genus: Carex
- Species: C. misera

Binomial name
- Carex misera Buckley

Synonyms
- Carex juncea Willd.; Carex rugeliana Kunze

Species of plant

Carex misera, the wretched sedge, is a species of flowering plant in the family Cyperaceae, native to high elevations in the southern Appalachians. It is found in about 25 locations growing in seeps and other wet situations on rocky ledges, cliff faces, and balds.
