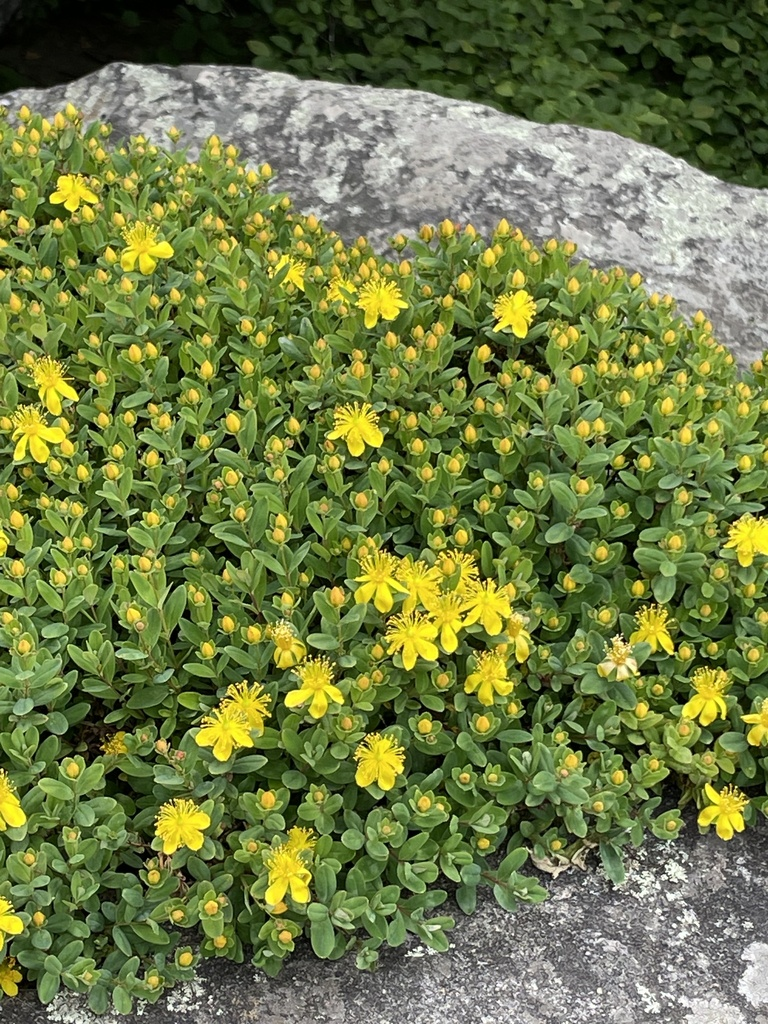
- In situ at Blood Mountain, Georgia

Conservation status
- Vulnerable (NatureServe)

Scientific classification
- Kingdom: Plantae
- Clade: Tracheophytes
- Clade: Angiosperms
- Clade: Eudicots
- Clade: Rosids
- Order: Malpighiales
- Family: Hypericaceae
- Genus: Hypericum
- Section: H. sect. Myriandra
- Subsection: H. subsect. Pseudobrathydium
- Species: H. buckleyi

Binomial name
- Hypericum buckleyi M.A.Curtis

Synonyms
- Hypericum buckleii

= Hypericum buckleyi =

Species of flowering plant

Hypericum buckleyi, commonly known as Blue Ridge St. John's wort, Buckley's St. John's wort, or Granite dome St. John's wort is a rare species of Hypericum in the family Hypericaceae. Hypericum buckleyi is small shrub endemic to the southern Appalachian Mountains of the southeastern United States.

== Description ==
Hypericum buckleyi is a small, decumbent shrub, growing up to 45 cm (18 in) tall and spreading to form low, compact mats. It has peeling, reddish stems with thin bark. The oblong or oblanceolate leaves are sessile or subsessile, up to 25 mm (0.98 in) long and 12 mm (0.47 in) broad. The species typically flowers in early July, typically they only produce one blossom per flowerhead, but there may be up to 5. The flowers are 20–25 mm (0.79–0.98 in) across with 5 golden yellow petals, becoming reflexed with age. The ovaries have three parts, forming narrowly ovoid to cylindric capsules.

== Distribution and habitat ==
Hypericum buckleyi has a limited range, known only to occur at 900–1,560 m (2,950–5,120 ft) in northeastern Georgia, northwestern South Carolina, and southwestern North Carolina. A montane species, they are most often found on thin soils over rock outcrops, barrens, glades and balds, particularly over exfoliated granite domes. Though their habitat can include wetter areas such as seeps and moist crevices as well.

== Conservation ==
NatureServe lists the species as vulnerable (G3) globally, vulnerable in North Carolina (S3), critically imperiled in Georgia (S1), and presumed extirpated in South Carolina (SX).
