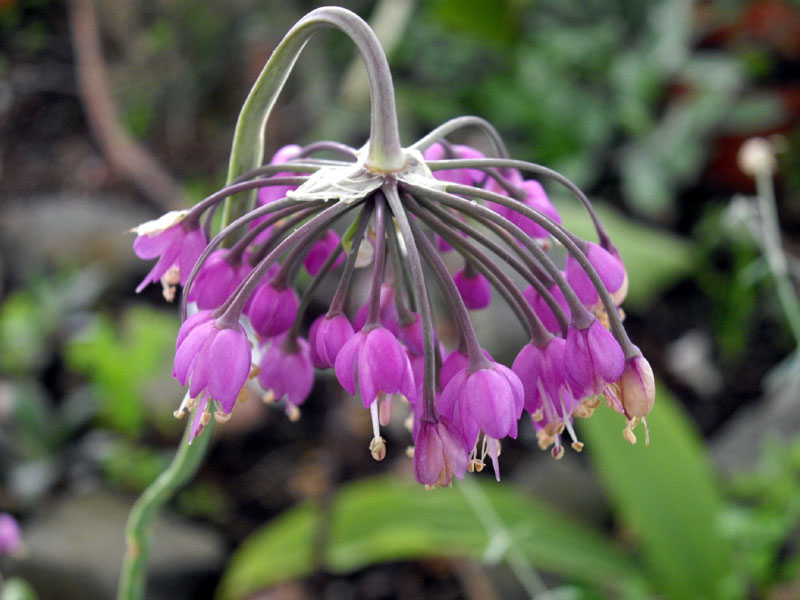
- Umbel

Conservation status
- Secure (NatureServe)

Scientific classification
- Kingdom: Plantae
- Clade: Tracheophytes
- Clade: Angiosperms
- Clade: Monocots
- Order: Asparagales
- Family: Amaryllidaceae
- Subfamily: Allioideae
- Genus: Allium
- Species: A. cernuum

Binomial name
- Allium cernuum Roth

Synonyms
- Allium alatum Schreb. ex Roth; Allium allegheniense Small; Allium cernuum f. alba J.K.Henry; Allium cernuum subsp. neomexicanum (Rydb.) Traub & Ownbey; Allium cernuum var. neomexicanum (Rydb.) J.F.Macbr.; Allium cernuum f. obtusum Cockerell; Allium cernuum var. obtusum (Cockerell) Cockerell; Allium cernuum subsp. obtusum (Cockerell) Traub & Ownbey; Allium cernuum var. obtusum Cockerell ex J.F. Macbr.; Allium neomexicanum Rydb.; Allium nutans Schult. & Schult.f.; Allium oxyphilum Wherry; Allium recurvatum Rydb.; Allium tricorne Poir.; Calliprena cernua (Roth) Salisb.; Cepa cernua (Roth) Moench; Gynodon cernuum (Roth) Raf.; Gynodon elliotii Raf.; Gynodon rupestre Raf.

= Allium cernuum =

Nodding onion

Species of flowering plant

Allium cernuum, known as nodding onion or lady's leek, is a perennial plant in the genus Allium. It grows in open areas in North America.

== Description ==
Allium cernuum is a herbaceous perennial growing from an unsheathed elongated conical bulb which gradually tapers directly into several keeled (thin and flat) grass-like leaves, 2–4 millimetres (3/32–5/32 inch) in width. Each mature bulb bears a single flowering stem, which terminates in a downward nodding umbel of white or rose, campanulate (bell-shaped) flowers that bloom in July and August. The flowers are arranged into downward facing umbels and each flower is about 5 mm (3/16 in) across, pink or white with yellow pollen and yellow anthers. A. cernuum does not have bulblets in the inflorescence. The flowers mature into spherical crested fruits which later split open to reveal the dark shiny seeds.

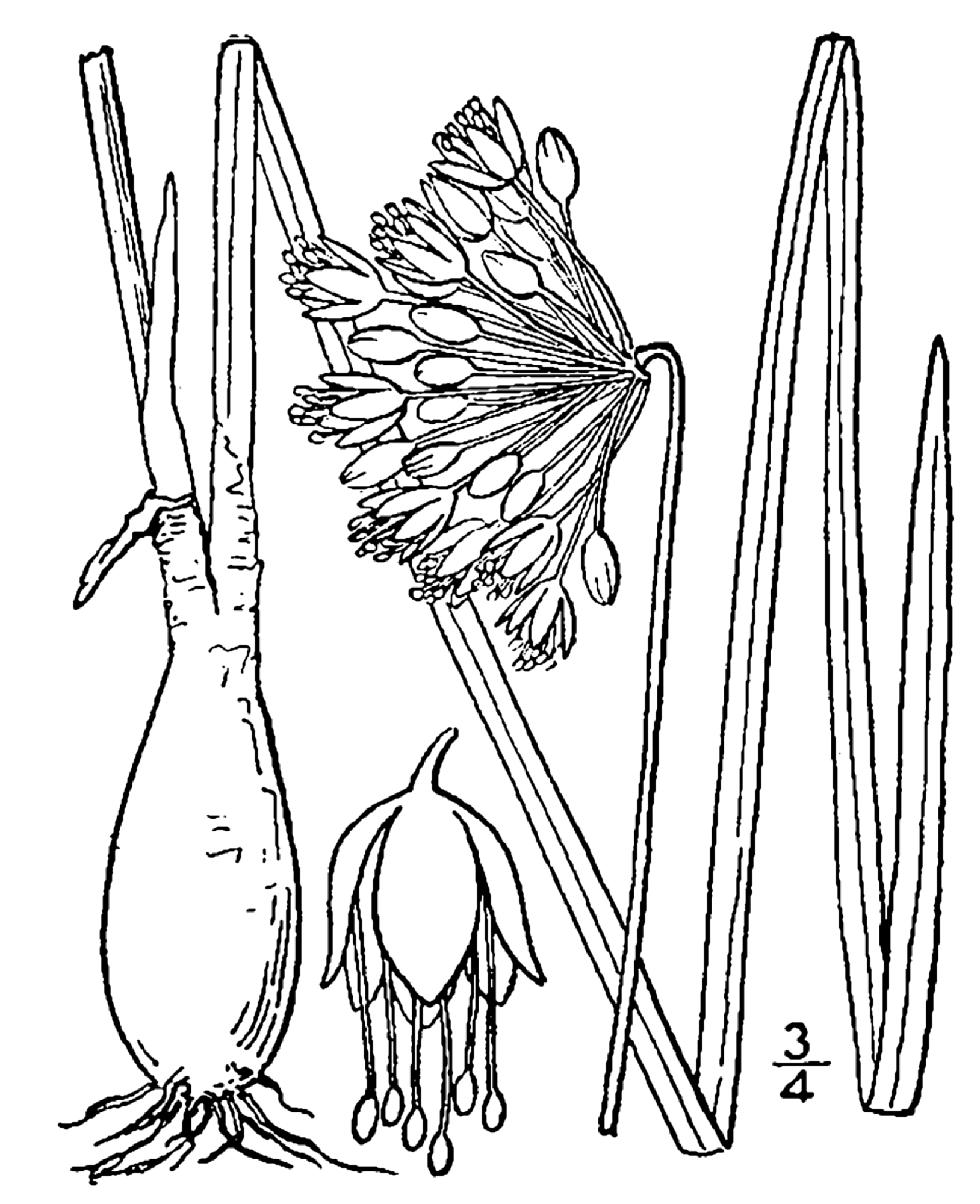
1913 illustration

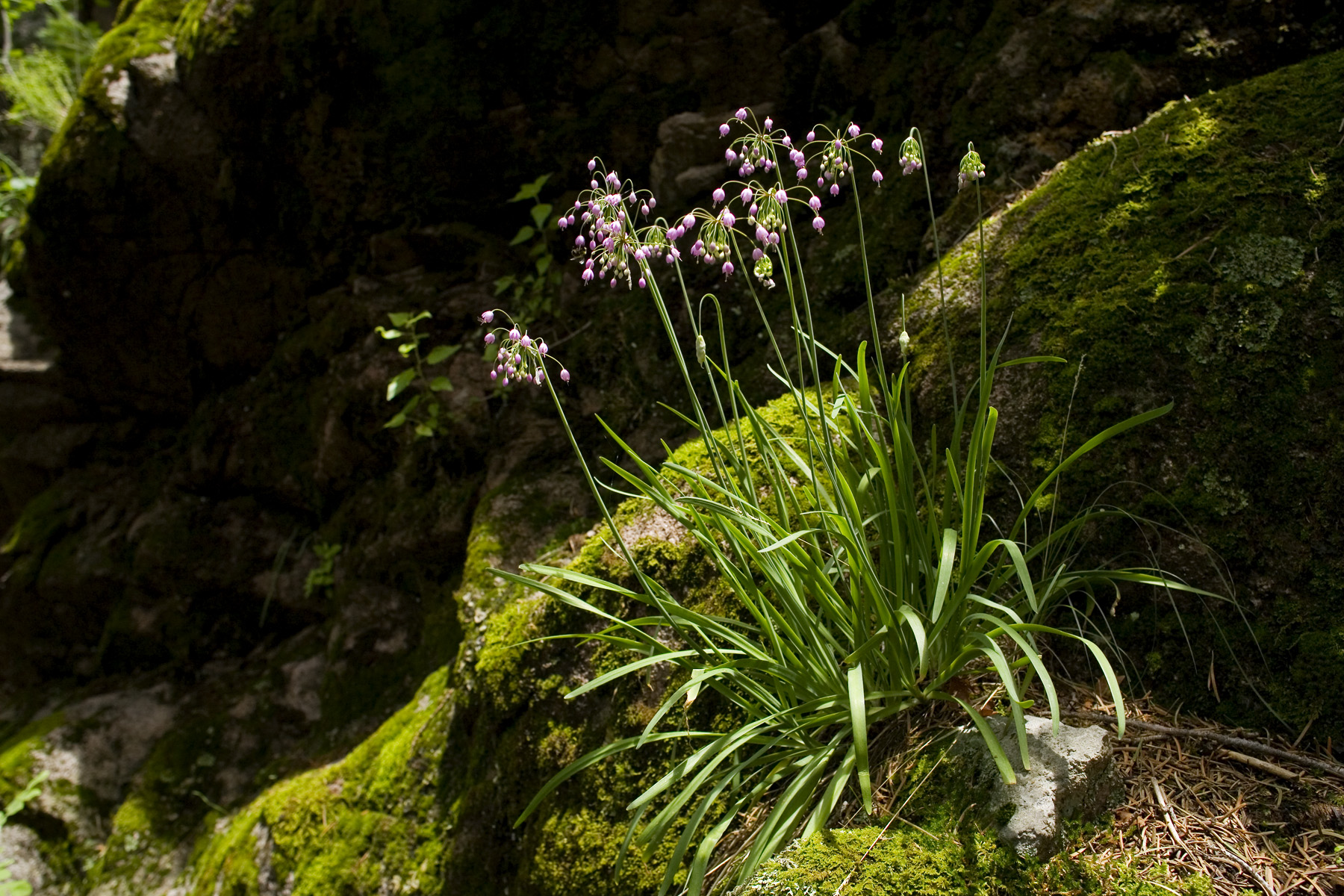
Plant in New Mexico

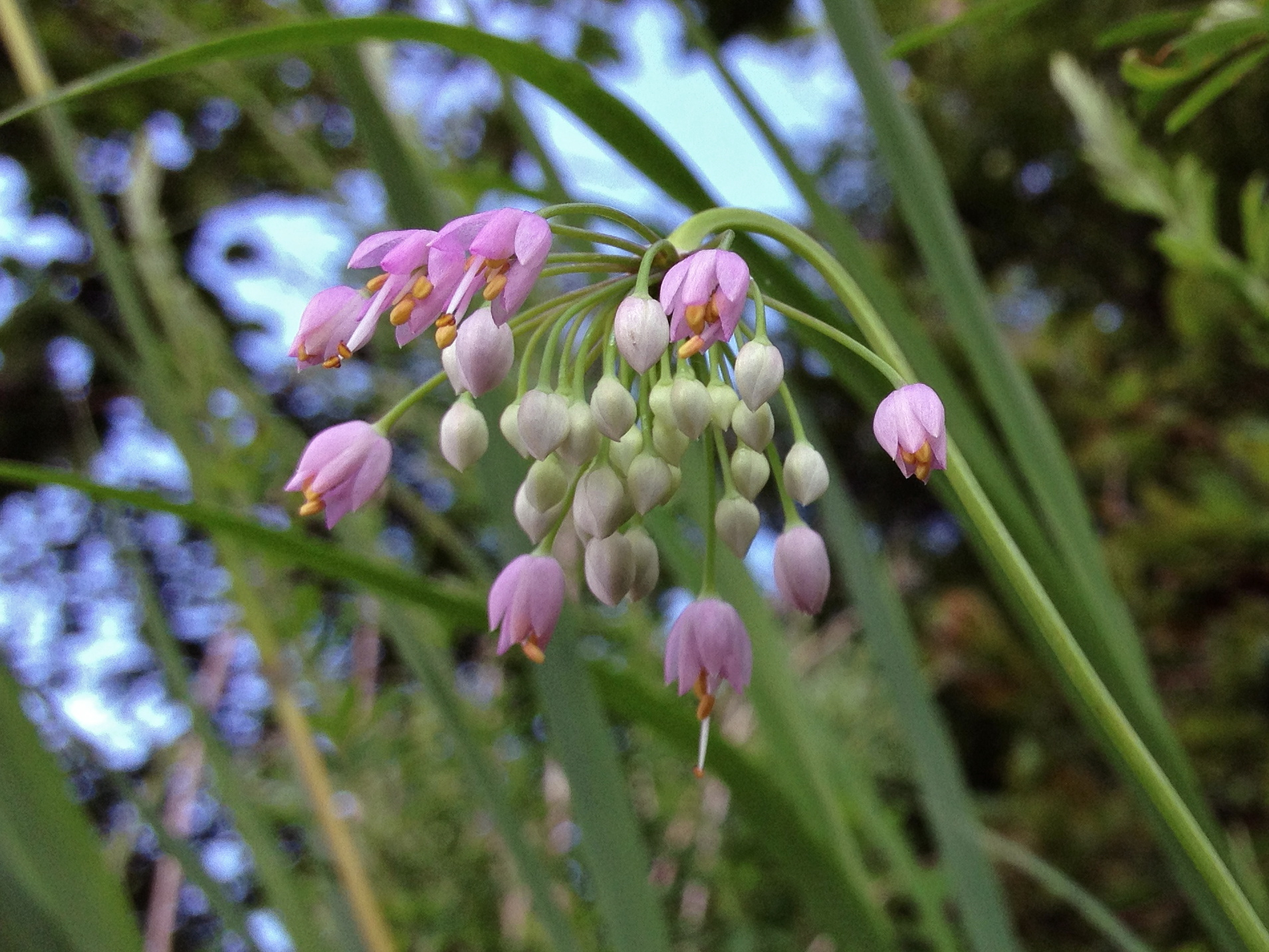
Flowers in bloom

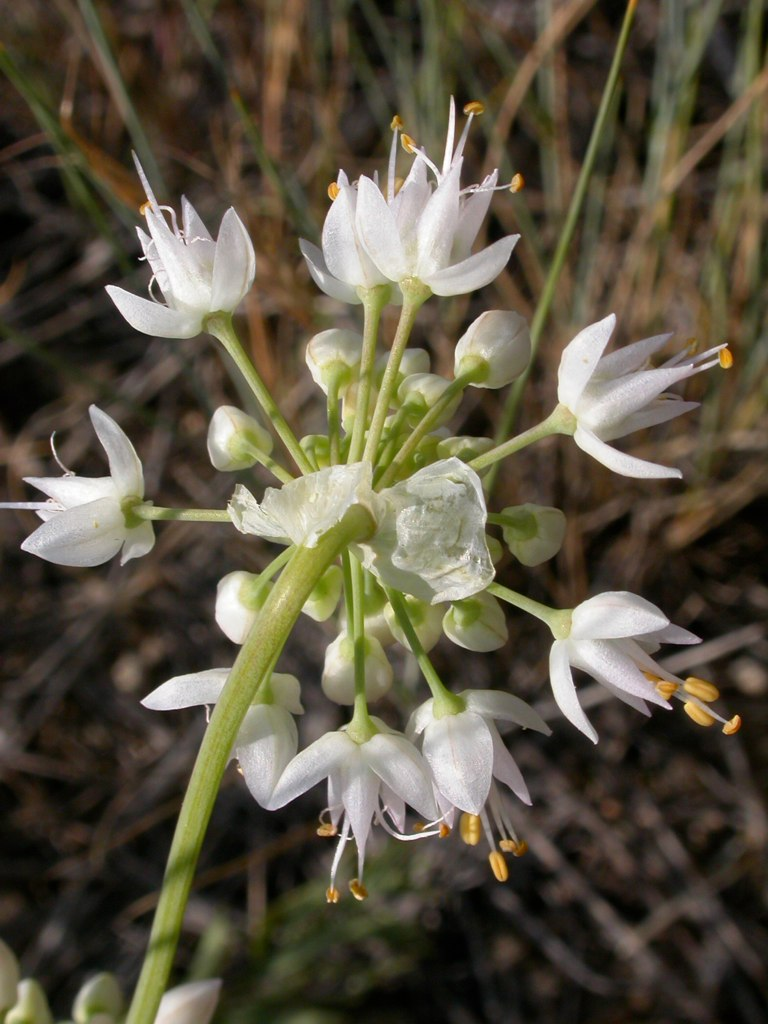
White flowers

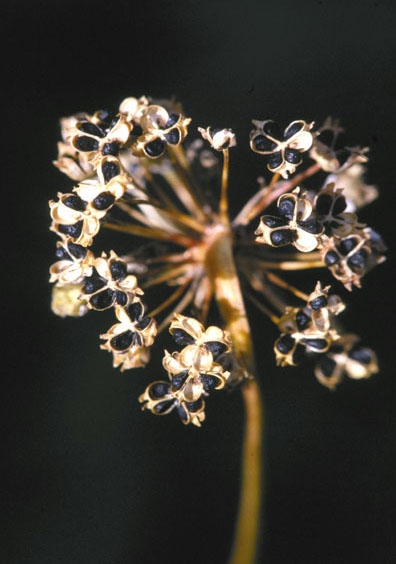
Seed head

=== Similar species ===
In addition to other species of Allium, wild garlic, field garlic, and wild leek look similar, as well as other onion-looking poisonous species, such as deathcamas, which lacks the expected onion odor.

== Distribution and habitat ==
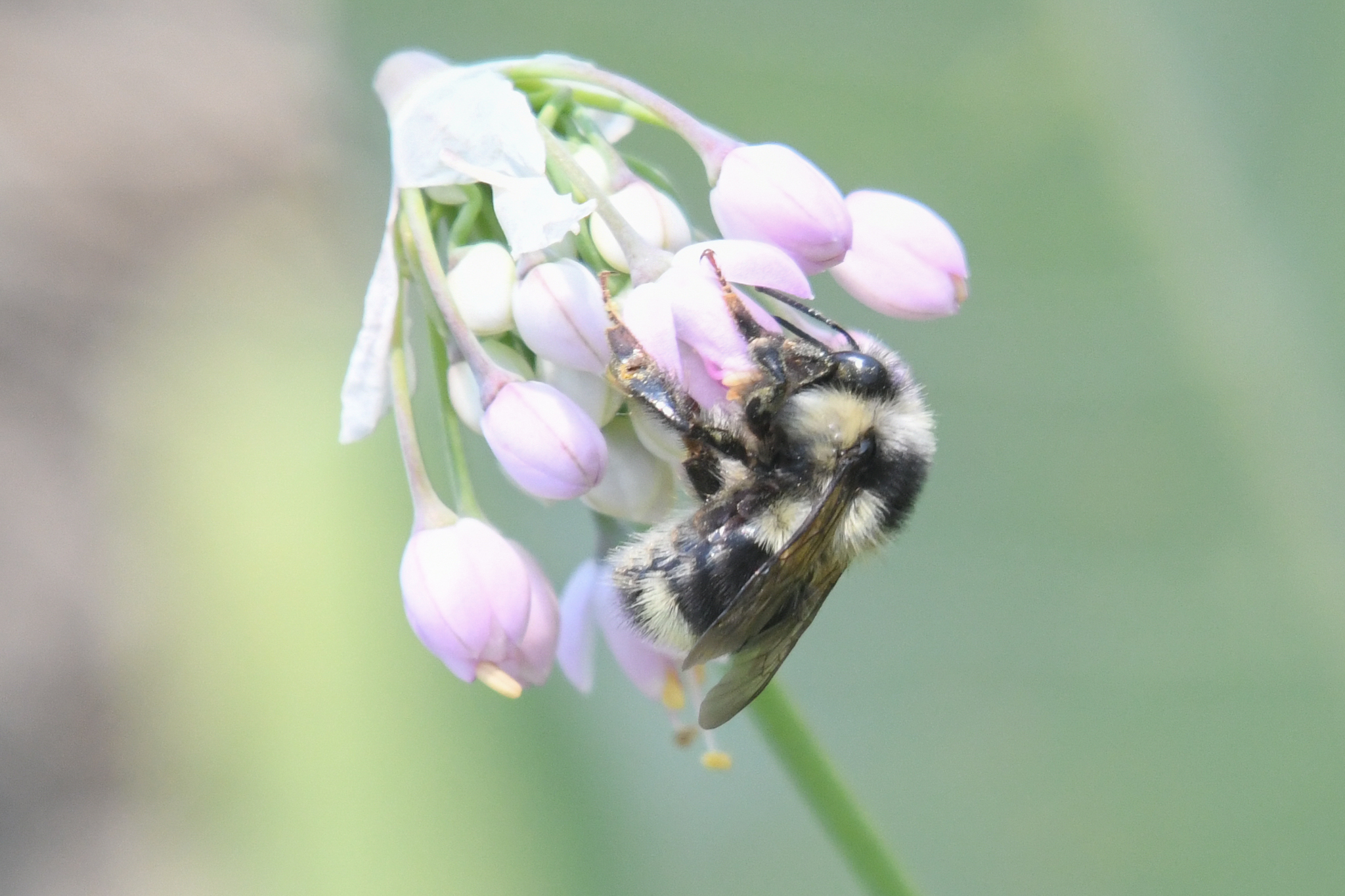
Bombus vancouverensis feeding on Allium cernuum

The species has been reported from much of the United States, Canada and Mexico including in the Appalachian Mountains from Alabama to New York State, the Great Lakes Region, the Ohio and Tennessee River Valleys, the Ozarks of Arkansas and Missouri, and the Rocky and Cascade Mountains of the West, from Mexico to Washington. It has not been reported from California, Nevada, Florida, Louisiana, Mississippi, New Jersey, Delaware, New England, or much of the Great Plains. In Canada, it grows from Ontario to British Columbia.

Despite its wide geographical distribution, it is absent from much of its range. In the southern part of its range in North America it is limited to mountainous habitats, and in other parts of its North American range it is limited to local and disjunct population. It is absent from North Dakota and most of the Great Plains states and intermountain region of the U.S. In Minnesota it is listed as a threatened species.

It can be found growing in deciduous woodlands, to open grasslands.

== Uses ==
A. cernuum is edible raw and has a strong onion flavor. It can be cooked in stews, but it is not widely used in modern cuisine.

=== Cultivation ===
It is grown in gardens for its distinctive nodding flowers that are white, pink, or maroon; it is winter hardy in U.S. Department of Agriculture hardiness zones 3–9. In gardens it will often form dense clusters of bulbs over time from offsets of the parent bulb. Plants are healthiest in full sun with well drained soil. In hot climates, they appreciate some shade, especially in the afternoon.
