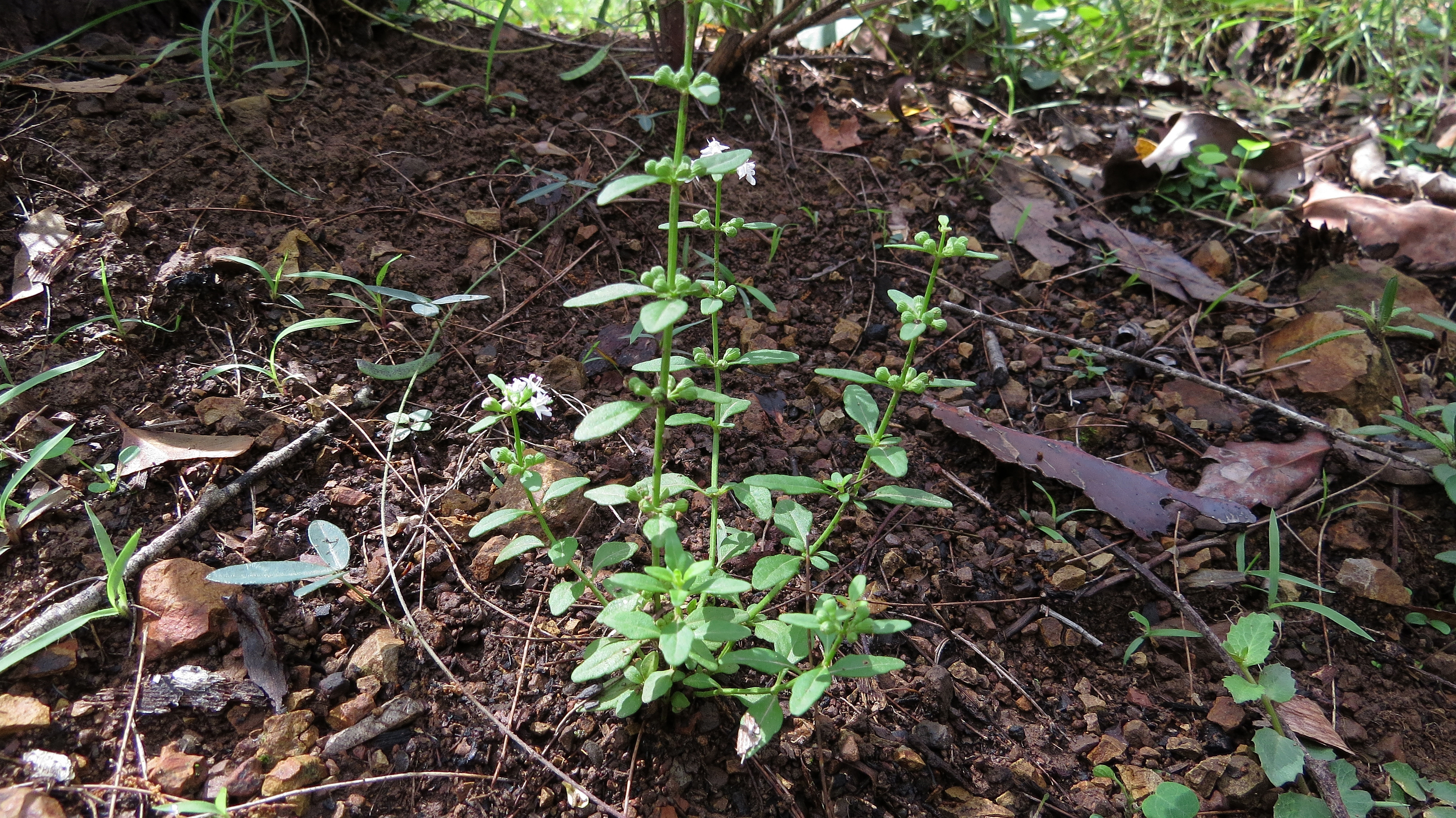

Scientific classification
- Kingdom: Plantae
- Clade: Tracheophytes
- Clade: Angiosperms
- Clade: Eudicots
- Clade: Asterids
- Order: Lamiales
- Family: Lamiaceae
- Genus: Mentha
- Species: M. satureioides

Binomial name
- Mentha satureioides R.Br.

= Mentha satureioides =

Species of flowering plant

Mentha satureioides, commonly known as native pennyroyal or creeping mint, is a species of herbaceous perennial native to southern + eastern Australia (Queensland, New South Wales, Victoria, South Australia). It was first described by prolific botanist Robert Brown in 1810.
