= Carex austrocaroliniana =

Scientific classification
- Kingdom: Plantae
- Clade: Tracheophytes
- Clade: Angiosperms
- Clade: Monocots
- Clade: Commelinids
- Order: Poales
- Family: Cyperaceae
- Genus: Carex
- Species: C. austrocaroliniana

Binomial name
- Carex austrocaroliniana L.H.Bailey

Species of plant

Carex austrocaroliniana is a tussock-forming species of perennial sedge in the family Cyperaceae. It is native to south eastern parts of the United States.

The species was first described by the botanist Liberty Hyde Bailey in 1893 as a part of the Bulletin of the Torrey Botanical Club. It has one synonym; Carex caroliniana as described by Samuel Botsford Buckley.

The plant grows in temperate biomes in the south eastern United States from Kentucky in the north to Alabama in the south.

== See also ==
- List of Carex species
