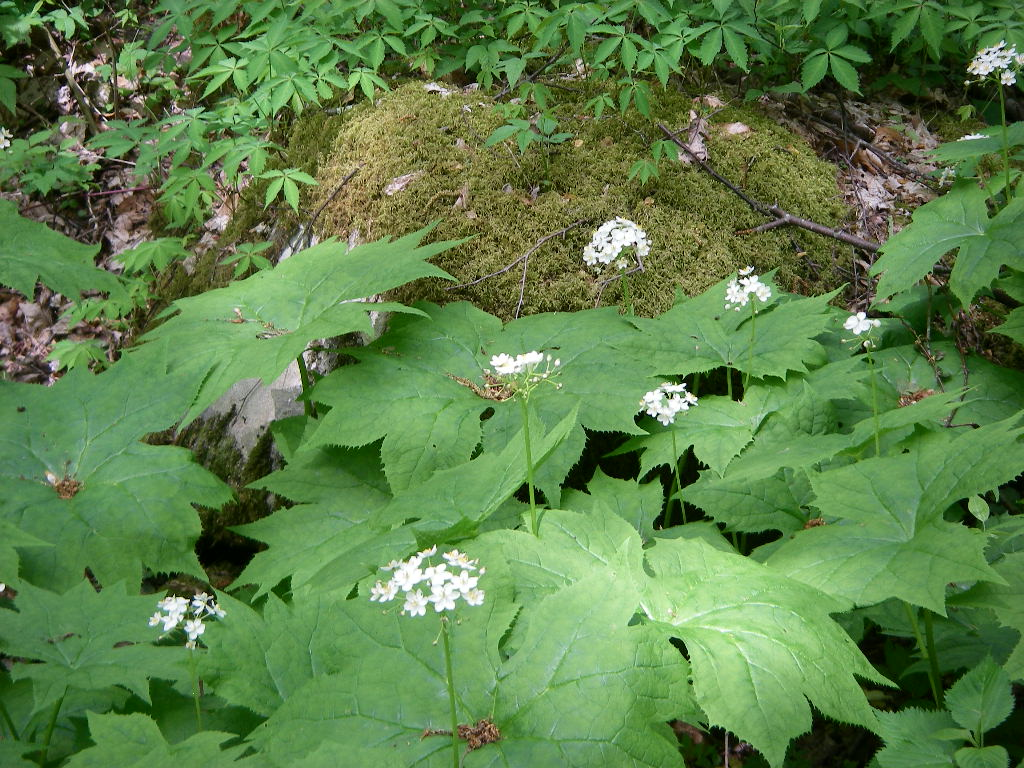

Conservation status
- Apparently Secure (NatureServe)

Scientific classification
- Kingdom: Plantae
- Clade: Embryophytes
- Clade: Tracheophytes
- Clade: Spermatophytes
- Clade: Angiosperms
- Clade: Eudicots
- Order: Ranunculales
- Family: Berberidaceae
- Genus: Diphylleia
- Species: D. cymosa

Binomial name
- Diphylleia cymosa Michx.

= Diphylleia cymosa =

Umbrellaleaf

Species of flowering plant

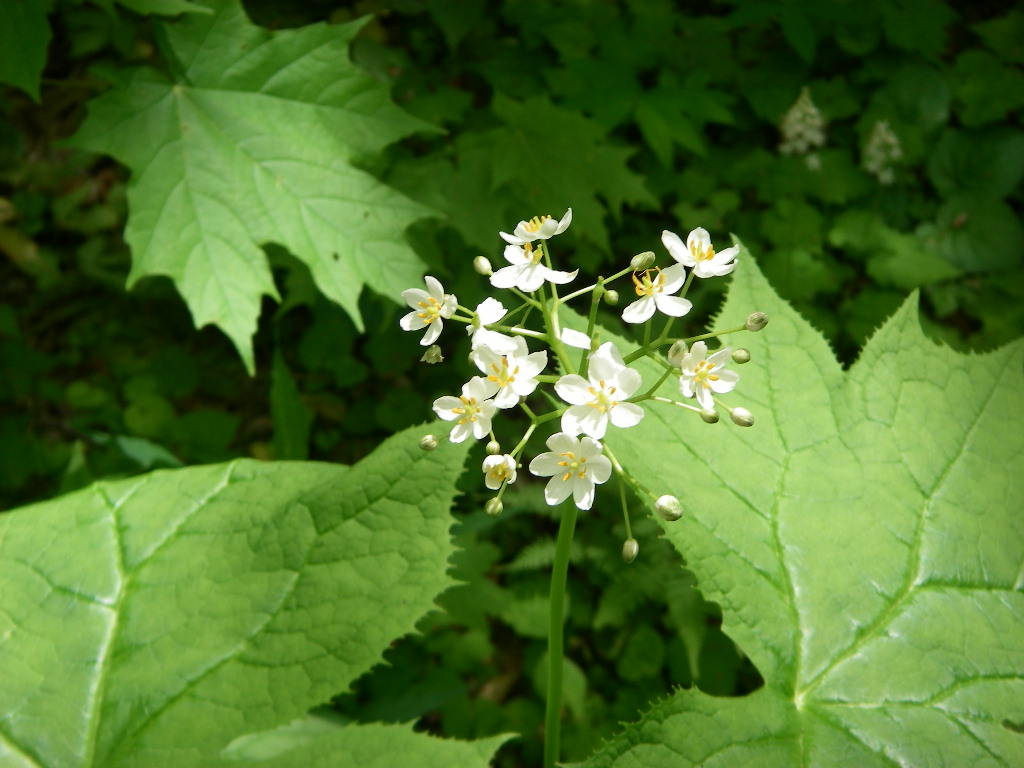
Umbrella leaf flower

Diphylleia cymosa, the umbrella leaf, is a North American ornamental plant of the barberry family, Berberidaceae, endemic to the southeastern United States. It is found in the deciduous forests of the southern Appalachian Mountains and blooms in the late spring. It was formerly known as Podophyllum cymosum.
