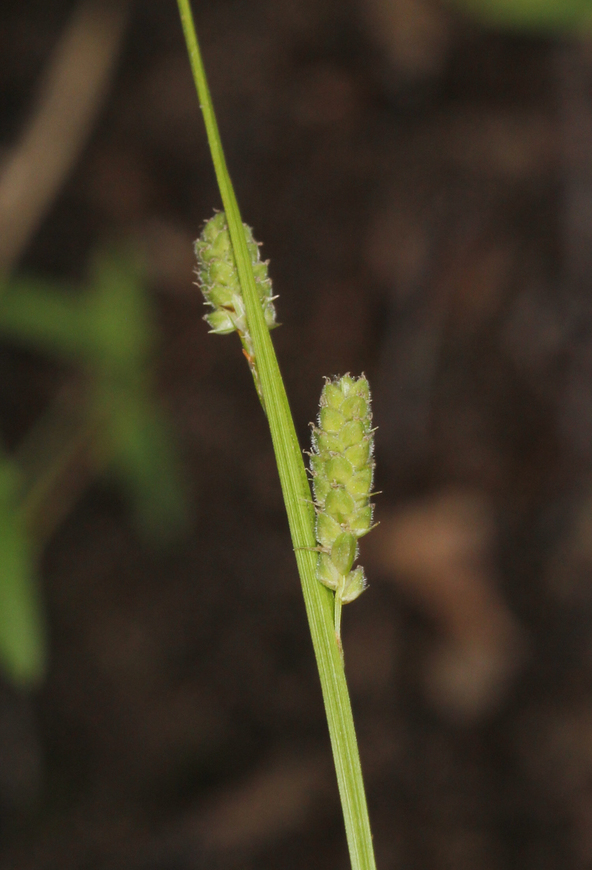

Scientific classification
- Kingdom: Plantae
- Clade: Tracheophytes
- Clade: Angiosperms
- Clade: Monocots
- Clade: Commelinids
- Order: Poales
- Family: Cyperaceae
- Genus: Carex
- Section: Carex sect. Porocystis
- Species: C. swanii

Binomial name
- Carex swanii (Fernald) Mack.

Synonyms
- Carex virescens var. swanii Fernald

= Carex swanii =

Species of grass-like plant

Carex swanii, known as Swan's sedge or downy green sedge, is a species of flowering plant in the family Cyperaceae. It is native to eastern North America.

It was originally described as Carex virescens var. swanii Fernald in 1906, then elevated to species in 1910. The species was named for Charles Walter Swan (1838-1921), a naval surgeon and early member of the New England Botanical Club.
