= Rhododendron cumberlandense =

Scientific classification
- Kingdom: Plantae
- Clade: Tracheophytes
- Clade: Angiosperms
- Clade: Eudicots
- Clade: Asterids
- Order: Ericales
- Family: Ericaceae
- Genus: Rhododendron
- Species: R. cumberlandense

Binomial name
- Rhododendron cumberlandense E.L.Braun

Synonyms
- Azalea cumberlandensis (E.L.Braun) H.F.Copel.

Species of plant

Rhododendron cumberlandense, the Cumberland rhododendron or Cumberland azalea, is a species of flowering plant in the family Ericaceae. It is native to the southeastern United States. A deciduous shrub with red flowers reaching 6 ft (1.8 m), it is typically found growing on the Cumberland Plateau.
