= Catherine Keever =

Educator and ecologist

- Born: September 8, 1908; Iredell County, North Carolina
- Died: May 9, 2003 (aged 94); Charlotte, North Carolina
- Education: Duke University
- Occupation: Ecologist
- Years active: 1940s-1990
- Known for: Highland Region Ecological Research

Catherine Keever (September 8, 1908 - May 9, 2003) was an educator and ecologist focused on ecological succession and highland region ecology. Keever proved that moss is the first plant to grow on bald rock, rather than lichens.

== Early life ==
Keever was born September 8, 1908, in Iredell County, North Carolina to John C. Keever, a Methodist preacher, and Blanche Moore Keever. Her brother, Homer Keever, was the historian of Irdell County, NC. During her childhood, Keever moved throughout Western North Carolina within the Methodist Conference as her father took on various churches. She attended Davenport College in Lenoir, North Carolina, for two years before transferring to Duke University in Durham, North Carolina. She completed her bachelor's degree, master's degree, and Ph.D. at Duke majoring in botany with minor studies in zoology. Throughout her studies, Keever taught at public high schools in Linwood, Lowell, and Burlington, North Carolina. During her education, Keever's research focused on plant growth and soil building process in highland areas. Dr. Elsie Quarterman was one of Keever's classmates at Duke and they remained friends and consistent collaborators throughout their lives. They both studied under HJ Oosting at Duke and graduated within their PhDs in 1949.

== Career ==
During her time at Duke, Keever extensively studied Rocky Face Mountain in Hiddenite, NC. Through her studies, she found proof that moss is the first plant to grow on bald rock and is the plant element that leads to soil attraction, rather than lichens, which was the scientific opinion at the time. Upon completing her education, Catherine Keever taught for two years at Duke before moving to Winthrop College in South Carolina where she taught biology. After Winthrop, she moved to Limestone College, where she would be named head of the biology department in 1952. In 1953, on the basis of ecological trends, Keever would speculate that oak-hickory forests would replace chestnut-oak forests in Southern Appalachia - an observation confirmed in a 1980 study by J. Frank McCormick and Robert B. Platt. She later moved on to the University of Georgia, where she taught botany until 1955. That same year she would move to Millersville University in Pennsylvania to teach botany and ecology. She would remain there until her retirement in 1974.

Despite not being at a research-heavy institution for the bulk of her career, Catherine Keever felt that she had an advantage. While she had a heavy teaching load, she was still able to conduct research on her own, rather than having to perform to the pressure of "publish or perish". During the 1970s, Keever and Dr. Elsie Quarterman took part in the National Natural Landmark inventories. During the inventory they identified two tracts of high-quality oak-hickory forest within Montgomery Bell State Park in Dickson County, Tennessee, which provides the best-known example of representative oak-hickory forest ecosystems on the Western Highland Rim in Tennessee. The presence of southern red oak and post oak in the dominant soil layer provide floristic and ecological affinities not found elsewhere in the upland forest. This area is now referred to as a Class II Natural-Scientific State Natural Area. After her retirement, Keever moved back to North Carolina residing in Boonville, and then Charlotte where she continued to conduct research and write.

== Legacy and honors ==
Catherine Keever died at the age of 94 on May 9, 2003, in Charlotte, North Carolina.

The Southeastern Chapter of the Ecological Society of America gives an annual Quarterman-Keever award for the best student poster in Ecology. Millersville University offers funds through a Keever Biology Research Training Fund established through a donation from Dr. Keever. The award is used to train students in methods and values of scientific research and is used to support undergraduate biology majors. Keever also provided a grant to Thomas Ellsworth Hemmerly for printing a full color field guide to Appalachian Wildflowers.

== Publications ==
- "Causes of Succession on Old Fields of the Piedmont, North Carolina" from Ecological Monographs, 1950
- "Present Composition of Some Strands of the Former Oak-Chestnut Forest in the Southern Blue Ridge Mountains" from Ecology, 1953
- "Establishment of Grimmia Laevigata on Bare Granite" from Ecology, 1957
- (with Elsie Quarterman) "Southern mixed hardwood forest: climax in the southeastern Coastal Plain" from Ecological Monographs
- "Distribution of Major Forest Species in Southeastern Pennsylvania" from Ecological Monographs, 1973
- Moving on: a way of Life from Brady Printing Company, Statesville, NC
