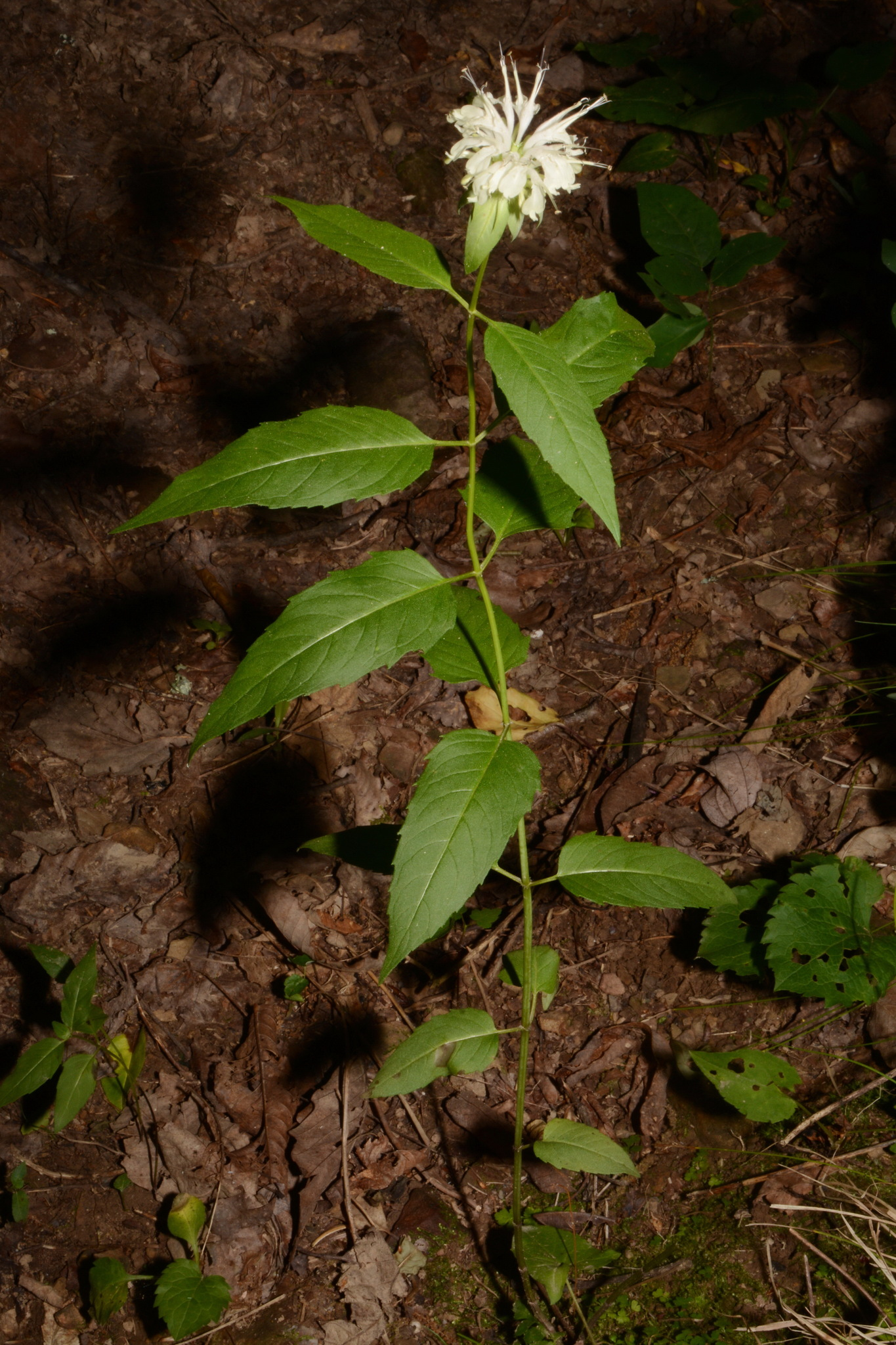

Scientific classification
- Kingdom: Plantae
- Clade: Tracheophytes
- Clade: Angiosperms
- Clade: Eudicots
- Clade: Asterids
- Order: Lamiales
- Family: Lamiaceae
- Genus: Monarda
- Species: M. austroappalachiana

Binomial name
- Monarda austroappalachiana A.Floden

= Monarda austroappalachiana =

Species of flowering plant

Monarda austroappalachiana is a species of flowering plant in the mint family (Lamiaceae). The species is known by the common name Southern Appalachian beebalm. It is native to the southern Appalachian region of the United States.

== Taxonomy ==
Monarda austroappalachiana was first formally described by Aaron Floden in 2015. The specific epithet refers to its distribution in the southern Appalachian Mountains of the southeastern United States.

== Distribution ==
This species is endemic to the southern Appalachian Mountains.
