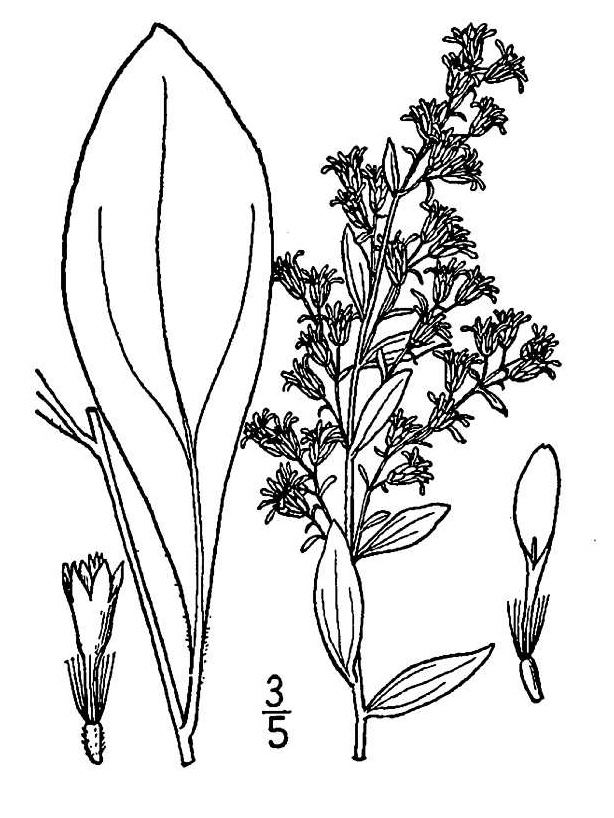
- 1913 illustration

Scientific classification
- Kingdom: Plantae
- Clade: Tracheophytes
- Clade: Angiosperms
- Clade: Eudicots
- Clade: Asterids
- Order: Asterales
- Family: Asteraceae
- Genus: Solidago
- Species: S. roanensis

Binomial name
- Solidago roanensis Porter

Synonyms
- Synonymy: Aster monticolus (Torr. & A.Gray) Kuntze; Solidago alleghaniensis (House) House; Solidago maxonii Pollard; Solidago monticola Jord. ex Boreau; Solidago sciaphila E.S.Steele

= Solidago roanensis =

Species of flowering plant

Solidago roanensis, the Roan Mountain goldenrod, is a North American species of goldenrod in the family Asteraceae. It is native to the eastern United States, primarily the Appalachian Mountains from Pennsylvania to Georgia, with some populations in the lowlands of South Carolina.

Solidago roanensis is perennial herb up to 100 cm (40 inches) tall with a branching underground caudex. One plant can produce as many as 250 small yellow flower heads in a long, narrow array.

The species is named for Roan Mountain, which straddles the state line between Tennessee and North Carolina. This is where the type specimen was collected.
