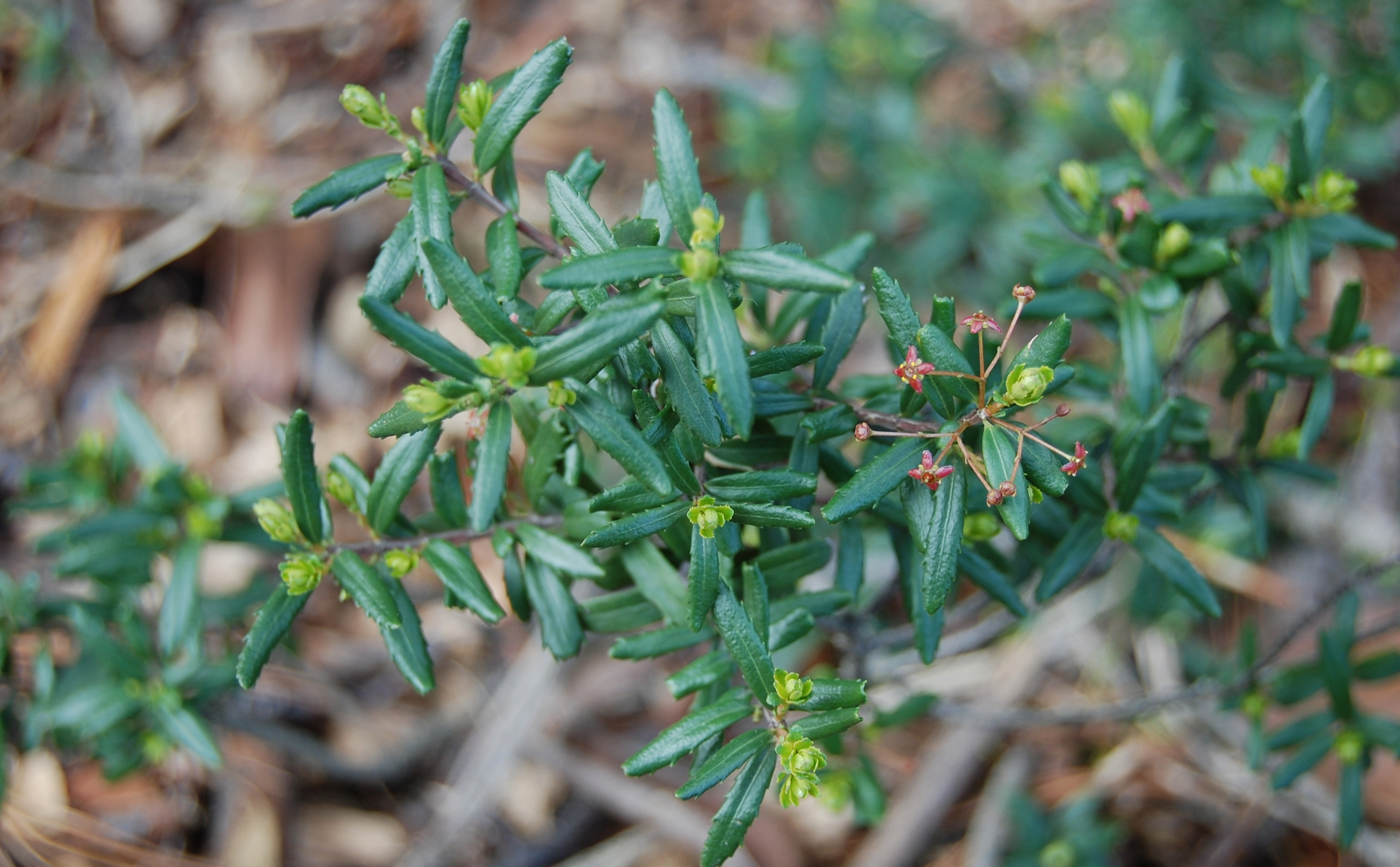

Conservation status
- Imperiled (NatureServe)

Scientific classification
- Kingdom: Plantae
- Clade: Tracheophytes
- Clade: Angiosperms
- Clade: Eudicots
- Clade: Rosids
- Order: Celastrales
- Family: Celastraceae
- Genus: Paxistima
- Species: P. canbyi

Binomial name
- Paxistima canbyi A.Gray

= Paxistima canbyi =

Species of shrub

Paxistima canbyi is a species of small broadleaf evergreen shrub or groundcover that is usually about one foot (0.30 m) high, but can grow up to almost three feet (0.91 m) high. It is in the family Celastraceae, and is known by the common names of Canby's mountain-lover, rat-stripper, ratstripper, Canby paxistima, or cliff green.

== Description ==
It is a small evergreen shrub, usually 8-16 inches high. It has opposite, simple, evergreen, linear-oblong or narrow oblong leaves about 1/4 to 1 inch (6.4 to 25.4 mm) long and 3/16 inch (4.8 mm) wide or less. The foliage is of fine texture and is lustrous dark green above in summer and often develops a bronze tint in cold weather. The tiny, inconspicuous flowers are perfect and greenish or reddish-green blooming in late April or early May with four petals and sepals. The tiny, inconspicuous fruit is a leathery two-valved capsule about 1/16 inch (1.6 mm) long and white.

== Distribution ==
It is native to the Appalachian Region of the eastern United States. Canby's mountain-lover is rare throughout its natural range from south-central Pennsylvania south to northwestern North Carolina to western Kentucky and southern Ohio. It grows in USDA hardiness zones 3 to 7. In the wild it grows over a large range of conditions from a shady site with moist, organic soil to full sun with calcareous, rocky soil on uplands and cliffs. When trying to grow it in a garden or landscape, it is best to grow it in a moist but well-drained organic acidic soil in a shady, sheltered site, as it is finicky and often does not adapt to cultivation and dies out even with good conditions. It is a rare plant in landscapes, but is sold by some large or specialty or native plant nurseries, usually in small pots, as a groundcover.

Canby's mountain-lover is listed as a candidate species for federal listing by the United States Fish and Wildlife Service. In 2021, it was listed as 'state threatened' in Kentucky and Maryland.
