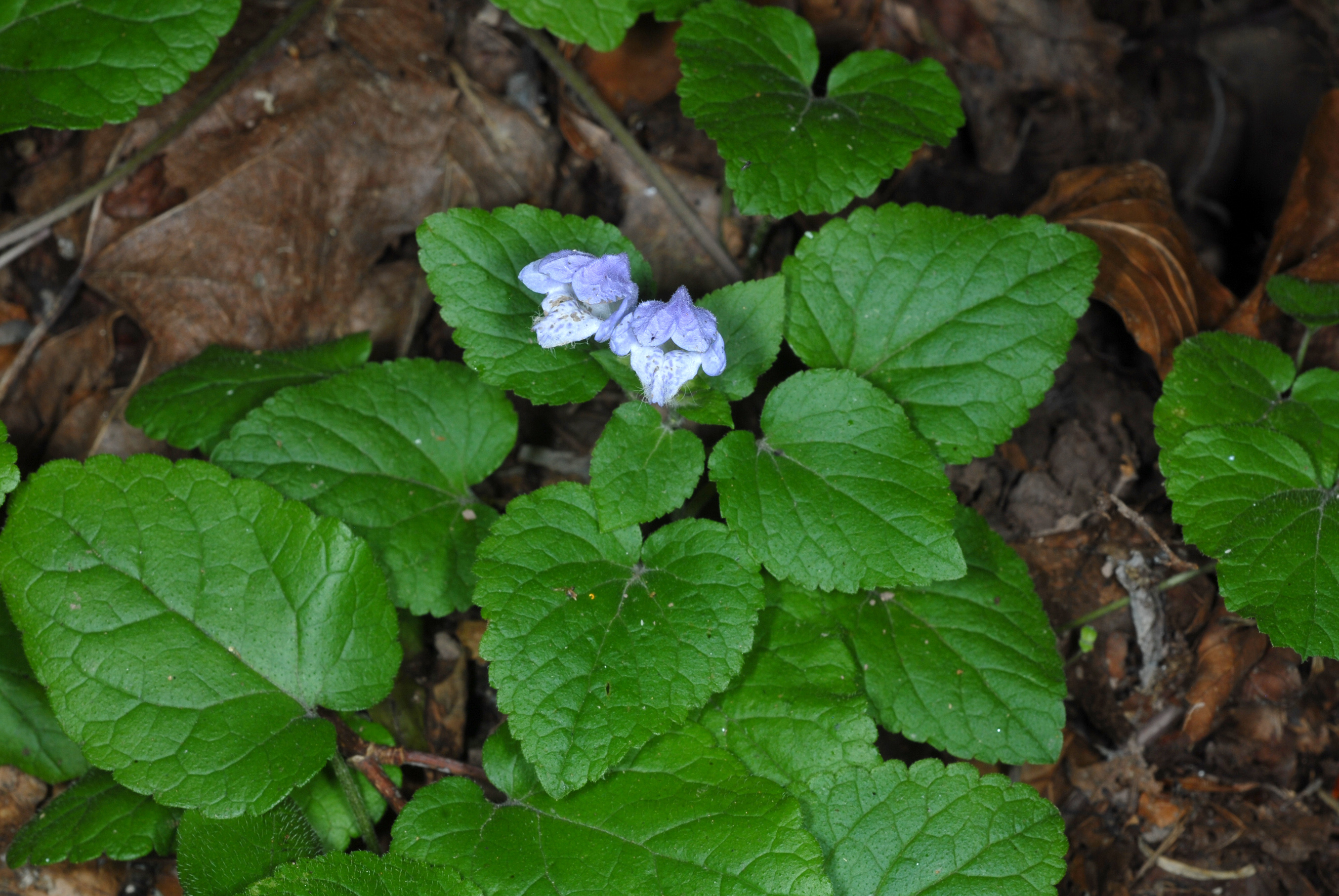

Scientific classification
- Kingdom: Plantae
- Clade: Tracheophytes
- Clade: Angiosperms
- Clade: Eudicots
- Clade: Asterids
- Order: Lamiales
- Family: Lamiaceae
- Genus: Meehania
- Species: M. cordata

Binomial name
- Meehania cordata (Nutt.) Britton

Synonyms
- Dracocephalum cordatum Nutt.; Cedronella cordata (Nutt.) Benth.

= Meehania cordata =

Species of flowering plant

Meehania cordata, also known as Meehan's mint or creeping mint, is a perennial plant of the genus Meehania, within the family Lamiaceae found in moist shady banks west of Pennsylvania to Illinois, Tennessee, and North Carolina. It typically blooms around the month of June.

== Description ==
Meehania, which was named by Nathaniel Lord Britton for the late Thomas Meehan, Philadelphian botanist, is a dicot perennial plant with calyx rather obliquely 5-toothed, 15 nerved. Corolla ample, expanded at the throat; the upper lip flattish or concave, 2-lobed, the lower 3-cleft, the middle lobe largest. Stamens 4, ascending, the lower pair shorter; anther-cells parallel. Low stoloniferous herb, with a pale purplish flowers.

Meehania cordata, which is one of seven species of the genus Meehania and named by the English botanist Thomas Nuttall, are low, with slender runners, hairy; leaves broadly heart-shaped, crenate, petioled, the floral shorter than the calyx; whorls few-flowered, at the summit of short ascending stems; corolla hairy inside, 2–3.5 cm (13/16–1 3/8 in) long; stamens shorter than the upper lip.

== Distribution ==
It is mostly found in eastern North America, in the following states:

- Illinois
- Kentucky
- North Carolina
- Ohio
- Pennsylvania
- Tennessee
- Virginia
- West Virginia

== Threatened and endangered information ==
This plant is listed by the U.S. federal government or a state.

- Pennsylvania: heart-leafed meehania: Endangered
- Tennessee: heartleaf meehania: Threatened
