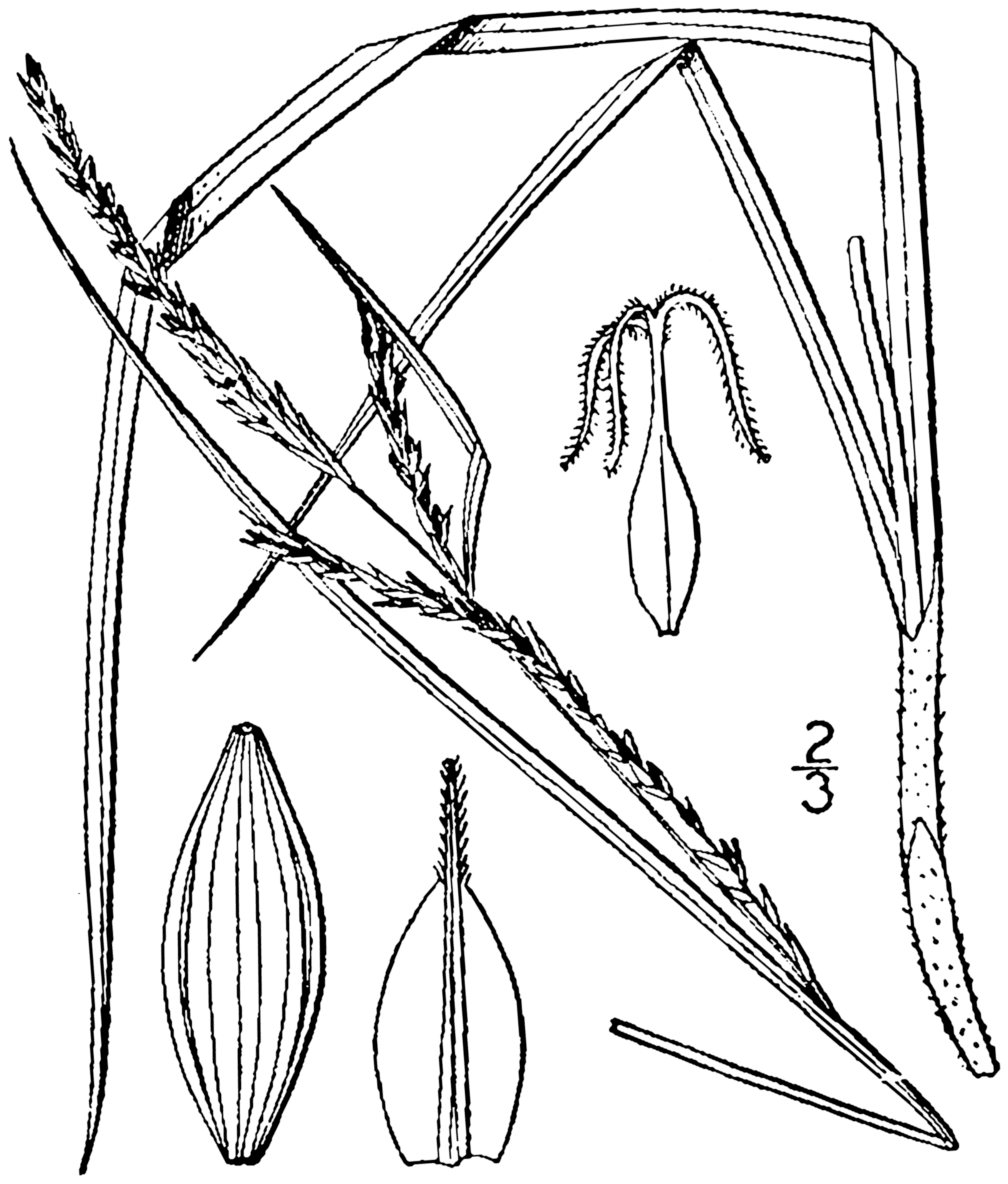

Scientific classification
- Kingdom: Plantae
- Clade: Tracheophytes
- Clade: Angiosperms
- Clade: Monocots
- Clade: Commelinids
- Order: Poales
- Family: Cyperaceae
- Genus: Carex
- Species: C. aestivalis

Binomial name
- Carex aestivalis M.A.Curtis ex A.Gray

= Carex aestivalis =

Species of grass-like plant

Carex aestivalis, the summer sedge, is a species of Carex native to North America. The specific epithet, aestivalis, is derived from Latin and means "pertaining to the summer".
