= Asarum marmoratum =

Conservation status
- Vulnerable (NatureServe)

Scientific classification
- Kingdom: Plantae
- Clade: Tracheophytes
- Clade: Angiosperms
- Clade: Magnoliids
- Order: Piperales
- Family: Aristolochiaceae
- Genus: Asarum
- Species: A. marmoratum

Binomial name
- Asarum marmoratum Piper

Species of flowering plant

Asarum marmoratum is a species of flowering plant known by the common names marbled wild ginger and marble-leaf wild ginger. Despite its common name, the plant is not closely related to ginger, instead belonging to the birthwort family, Aristolochiaceae. It is a low-growing perennial plant with variegated evergreen leaves and inconspicuous flowers borne close to the ground. It is thought to reproduce primarily through self-pollination, but its flowers are also thought to mimic fungi to attract flies that facilitate pollination. The seeds contain fleshy tissues that attract ants to aid with dispersal.

The species has a relatively narrow distribution in the Siskiyou and Cascade mountain ranges in southwestern Oregon and northwestern California, where it grows in dry or mesic forests and on rocky slopes. It is far more common in Oregon than in California, where all known populations occur within 20 km (12 mi) of the state border. Though its population trends are unknown and threats are poorly understood, the species is considered vulnerable, especially in California where habitat destruction from logging may have contributed to population declines.

Although Asarum marmoratum was first described in 1916, it was generally treated as conspecific with A. hartwegii for much of the twentieth century. A 1990 study argued for its recognition as a distinct species, distinguished from A. hartwegii by both floral and vegetative characters, a treatment now accepted by taxonomic authorities.

== Description ==
=== Morphology ===
Flowers of Asarum marmoratum are borne near the ground, under the leaves.

Asarum marmoratum is a low-growing herbaceous perennial forming clumps less than 4 dm (16 in) in diameter. The leaves and flowers arise from a branched, underground, vertically oriented rhizome that is 2–4 mm (0.08–0.2 in) in diameter and grows 3–35 mm (0.1–1.4 in) per year. Its roots are fleshy and situated at the base of the rhizome. Each rhizome branch produces one new pair of evergreen, alternately arranged leaves per year, held on hairy petioles 5–20 mm (0.2–0.8 in) long. The leaves are heart-shaped to kidney-shaped with acute tips and measure 4–14 cm (2–6 in) long and 3–12 cm (1–5 in) wide at their widest point. Like the closely related A. hartwegii, the leaves of A. marmoratum are typically dark green with a broad, white or silver band along the midrib and varying amounts of marbling along the lateral veins, although rarely the leaves are entirely green or white. Short hairs are sparsely arranged across the lower leaf surfaces and sometimes also along the veins of the upper surfaces. Fine hairs called cilia also line the leaf margins, projecting nearly perpendicular to the edges.

The flowers are borne singly and bloom from April to July. They point upward and are 2.5–6 cm (1.0–2.4 in) long, 0.9–1.5 cm (0.4–0.6 in) wide, and held on hairy stalks 1–2.5 cm (0.4–1.0 in) long. The three sepals are joined at their bases, forming a globe-shaped tube, but are distally free, with long, tapering tips. The outer surfaces of the sepals may be pink, red, beige, green, tan, or brown with long white hairs, in contrast to the inner surfaces, which are maroon with small, dark red hairs. Two whorls of six stamens each surround and overtop the style column, and the stamen tips are longer than and extend beyond the pollen-bearing anther sacs. The style is red or pink, shallowly or deeply lobed, and has six stigmas. At the base of the flower, the ovary is pink, beige, or green with red spots and long hairs; it contains 26–46 ovules, which develop into seeds.

The fruit is a capsule, 1.5–2 cm (0.6–0.8 in) long. Each seed has a fleshy structure called a funiculus that attracts ants, which disperse the seeds. The chromosome number of A. marmoratum is unknown, but other members of the genus, including the closely related A. hartwegii, have a base chromosome number of 13.

=== Comparison with similar species ===
In southwestern Oregon and northwestern California, Asarum marmoratum is most likely to be confused with its congener A. hartwegii, which also has marbled, evergreen leaves, although the distributions of the two species do not overlap. When not in flower, the two species are difficult to distinguish but can be identified by the orientation of the marginal leaf hairs, which are perpendicular to the leaf edges in A. marmoratum and angle or curve strongly toward the leaf apex in A. hartwegii. Flower shape and color also differentiate the two species: A. marmoratum produces globe-shaped flower tubes with dark red inner surfaces covered by dark red hairs, whereas A. hartwegii has cylindrical flower tubes with white- and maroon-striped inner surfaces covered by white hairs.

Diagnostic differences between A. marmoratum and A. hartwegii

Dark red hairs cover the inner flower surfaces of A. marmoratum.

Cilia project nearly perpendicular to the leaf margin in A. marmoratum.

White hairs cover the inner flower surfaces of A. hartwegii.

Cilia angle toward the leaf apex along the margins of A. hartwegii.

The other two Asarum species found within the range of A. marmoratum are A. caudatum and A. wagneri. Unlike A. marmoratum, which forms distinct clumps, those species grow in loose clumps or more commonly mats along the forest floor. Their leaves are entirely green, and their anther connectives are shorter than the pollen sacs.

== Taxonomy ==
The botanist Charles Piper formally described Asarum marmoratum in 1916. He collected the type specimen in April of the previous year from the mountains around Cow Creek in Douglas County, Oregon.

Until the 1990s, Asarum marmoratum was rarely recognized as a distinct species, with most authorities either not recognizing the name or considering it a synonym of A. hartwegii. In 1990, Michael Mesler and Karen Lu compared the floral and vegetative morphology of A. marmoratum with that of other members of its genus in western North America and argued for its recognition as a distinct species. Their interpretation was adopted by the Flora of North America and remains accepted by contemporary taxonomic authorities.

Historically, botanists have differed in their interpretations of relationships between species in the genus Asarum and on the circumscription of the genus as a whole. Asarum marmoratum belongs to a clade called subgenus Asarum, sometimes referred to as Asarum sensu stricto, comprising several species from North America and Eurasia. Some authors have subdivided Asarum sensu stricto into sections based on sepal morphology, placing A. marmoratum in section Asarum along with both North American and Eurasian species and placing two of the other western North American species, A. caudatum and A. hartwegii, in section Calidasarum. More recent molecular phylogenetic studies do not support these groups as monophyletic, instead recovering the North American members of subgenus Asarum as forming a single clade.

Phylogenetic relationships within Asarum subgenus Asarum

- Subgenus Asarum
  - Section Geotaenium
  - Section Asarum
    - A. caudigerum
    - A. himalaicum
    - A. pulchellum
    - A. caulescens
    - - A. europaeum
      - - A. caudigerellum
        - A. debile
      - - A. canadense
        - A. marmoratum
        - A. hartwegii
        - - A. caudatum
          - A. lemmonii
- Subgenus Heterotropa

A cladogram summarizing phylogenetic relationships in Asarum inferred from a combined analysis of morphological and molecular data in Kelly (1998).

== Distribution and habitat ==
Asarum marmoratum growing on a rocky chaparral slope beside a trail in the Siskiyou Mountains

Asarum marmoratum is endemic to southwestern Oregon and northern California, where it grows in the Siskiyou Mountains and adjacent slopes of the Cascade Range. The elevational range is 200–1,800 m (660–5,900 ft). Typical habitat includes dry or mesic forests, exposed, rocky slopes, and roadcuts, where it is associated with Douglas fir, Abies concolor, Chamaecyparis lawsoniana, and Quercus sadleriana. It is not known to be sympatric with the morphologically similar A. hartwegii but sometimes grows with A. caudatum. Its distribution consists of widely scattered populations, most of which are small but vary considerably in the number of individuals.

The plant's distribution ranges from southern Lane County, Oregon to 20 km (12 mi) south of the Oregon state border in Del Norte and Siskiyou counties, California. Records of A. marmoratum from Shasta County, California were later determined to be A. hartwegii. The species is far more common in southwestern Oregon than in California, where there are only eleven known occurrences.

== Ecology ==
The flowers of Asarum species grow close to the ground, and botanist Stefan Vogel proposed that they mimic fungi to attract mycophagous flies as pollinators. According to this hypothesis, flies whose larvae feed on decaying fungi enter Asarum flowers to lay their eggs, potentially facilitating self- or cross-pollination in the process. There is evidence supporting this pollination mechanism in A. hartwegii, a species closely related to A. marmoratum, although most seed production in the studied populations was attributed to autonomous self-pollination. A. marmoratum is also thought to reproduce primarily through self-pollination, with pollination by mycophagous flies playing a more limited role. Like other members of its genus, A. marmoratum also spreads vegetatively by producing ramets, resulting in large clumps of genetically identical plants.

The seeds of A. marmoratum have a fleshy appendage called a funiculus that attracts ants. The ants transport the seeds, serving as the species' primary means of dispersal through a process called myrmecochory. Because ants typically carry the seeds short distances, this dispersal mechanism has limited potential to expand the species' geographic range but helps maintain continuity within existing populations.

== Conservation ==
Little is known about the conservation trends and threats to Asarum marmoratum. It is considered a vulnerable species globally by NatureServe but is not listed nationally or in Oregon or California as an endangered or threatened species. The California Native Plant Society ranks the species 2B.3 in its Inventory of Rare and Endangered Plants of California, denoting that the species is rare but not particularly threatened in California and more common elsewhere. In Oregon, the species is not tracked by the Oregon Biodiversity Information Center, which maintains lists of rare and endangered plants in the state.

Within California, all known populations but one occur within national forests, including the Klamath National Forest, Rogue River–Siskiyou National Forest, and Six Rivers National Forest. However, these publicly managed forests have been subject to disproportionately high levels of logging, which has been identified as the primary threat to populations. In 2013, estimates of the number of plants across seven of California's populations, mostly based on data from 1998 and 1999, ranged from 1,400 to 18,200. Population trends in California are poorly understood due to a lack of data and possibly inter-seasonal variation or variance in clonal patch sizes, although some counts show significant population declines in the 1990s.

== Cultivation ==
Asarum marmoratum is sometimes grown in cultivation and grows well in containers. The plants are deer resistant but particularly susceptible to herbivory by snails and slugs.
