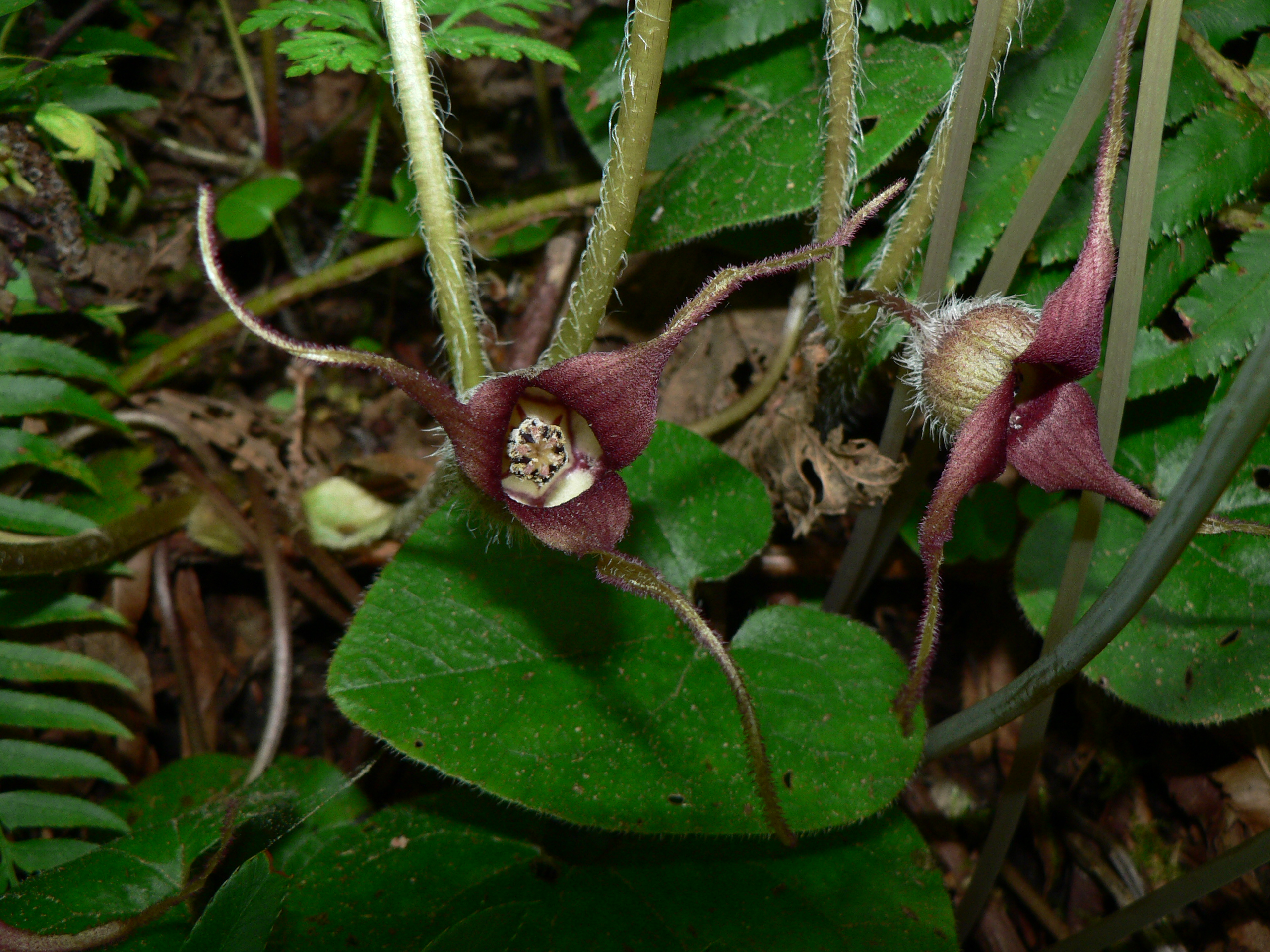

Conservation status
- Secure (NatureServe)

Scientific classification
- Kingdom: Plantae
- Clade: Tracheophytes
- Clade: Angiosperms
- Clade: Magnoliids
- Order: Piperales
- Family: Aristolochiaceae
- Genus: Asarum
- Species: A. caudatum

Binomial name
- Asarum caudatum Lindl.

Synonyms
- Asarum hookeri Fielding & Gardner; Asarum rotundifolium Raf.

= Asarum caudatum =

Species of flowering plant

Asarum caudatum (British Columbia wild ginger, western wild ginger, or long-tailed wild ginger) is a plant native to rich moist forests of western North America. It has heart-shaped leaves and a three-lobed purplish flower.

== Description ==
Growing from a long rhizome, the reniform (kidney/heart-shaped) leaves range from 2–10 centimetres (3/4–4 inches) in length. The leaves are found in colonies or clusters as the rhizome spreads, forming mats. The leaves emit a ginger aroma when rubbed.

Blooming from April to July (about a month earlier in British Columbia), the flower sits at the end of a 15 cm (6 in) leafstalk, often on the ground, hidden by the leaves. The flowers are hirsute (hairy), cup-shaped, and brown-purple to green-yellow, terminating in three, long, gracefully curved lobes.

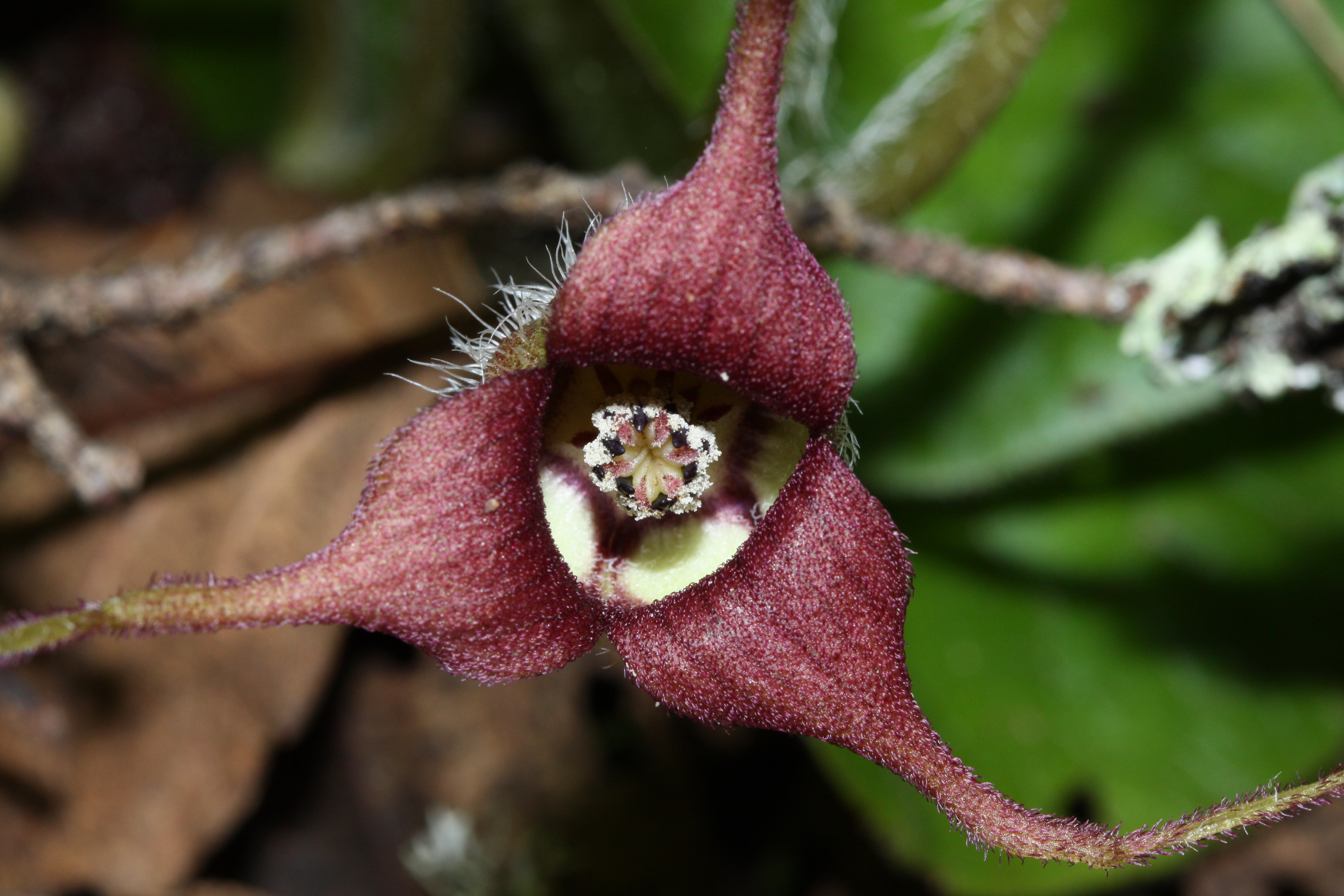
Flowers

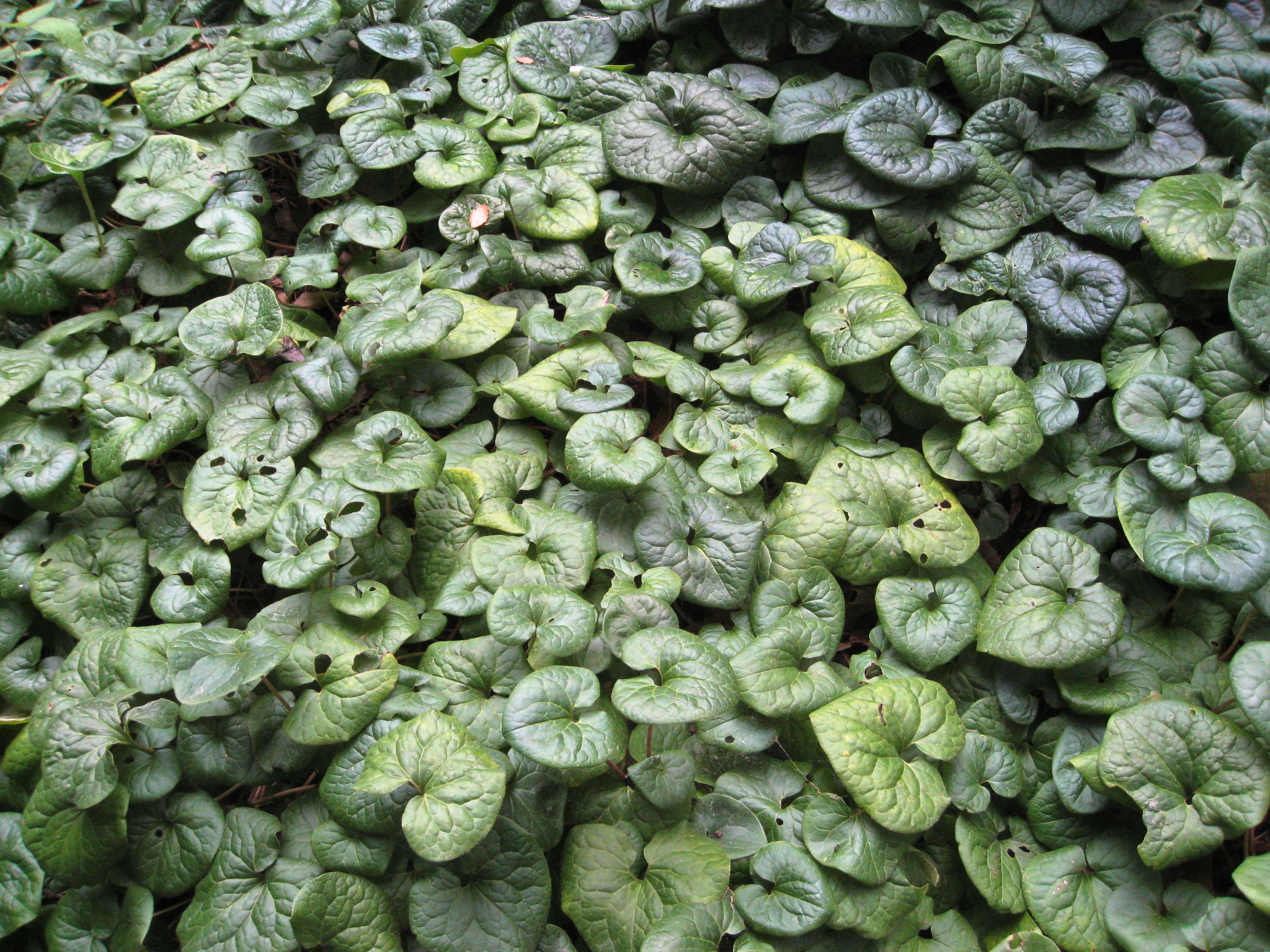
Leaves

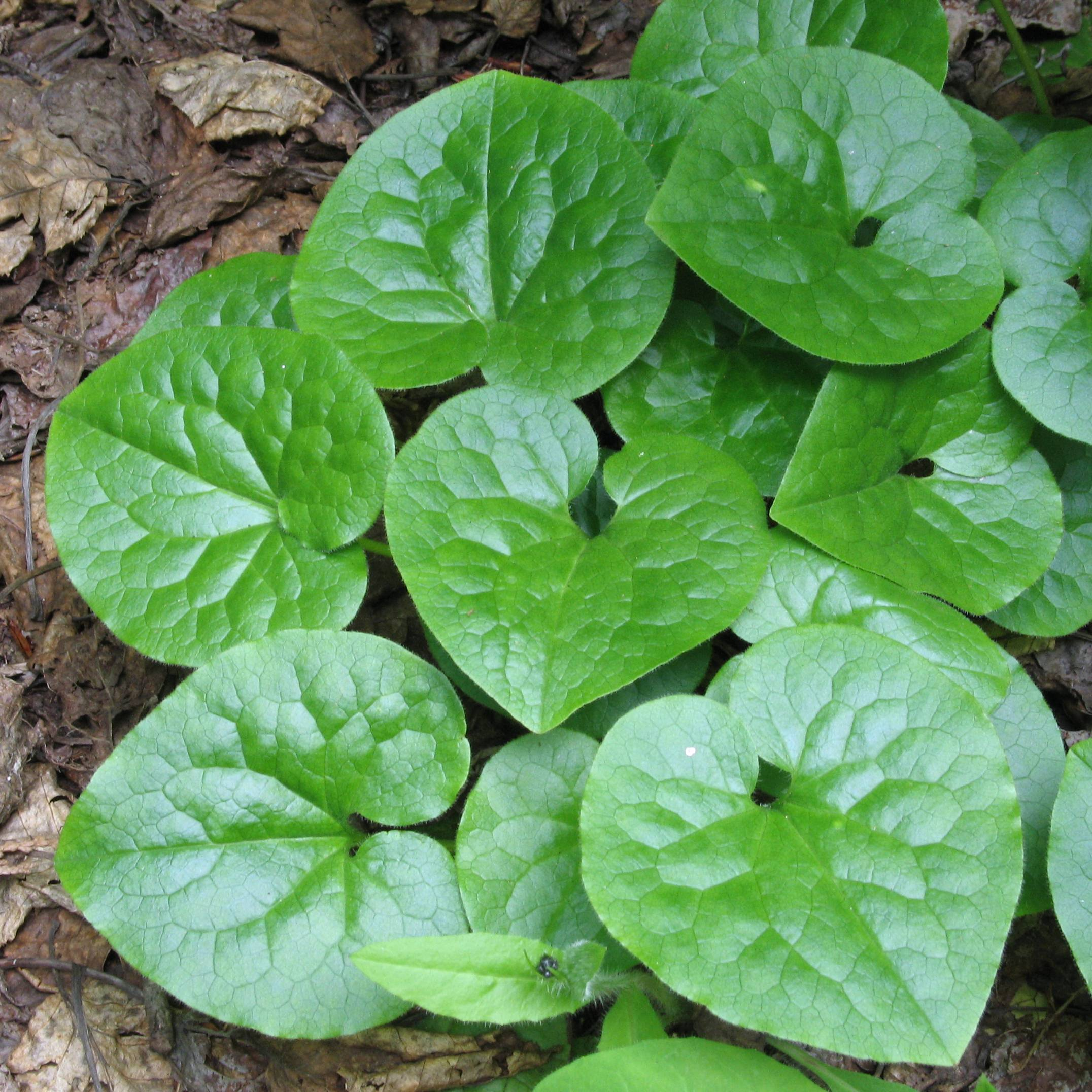
Leaves close up

=== Similar species ===
Similar species include A. hartwegii, A. lemmonii, and A. marmoratum.

== Etymology ==
Caudatum comes from the Latin cauda, meaning tail. This refers to the tail-like shape of the flower's calyx.

== Distribution and habitat ==
Asarum caudatum is found in British Columbia, Washington, Oregon, Northern California, Idaho, and Montana in moist, shaded environments. Its northernmost populations occur near Meziadin Lake. It is a typical herb found in the understory of mixed conifer forests under 670 metres (2,200 ft) in elevation, and is often a dominant plant.

== Ecology ==
A. caudatum reproduces rhizomatously, meaning many mats are formed by one clonal plant connected by a rhizome. It can also reproduce sexually, with its seeds dispersed by ants. The flowers are pollinated by flies. However, cross-pollination is rare. Ants are attracted by a fatty appendage attached to the seed. The ants carry the entire package back to their colonies. The seed is often dropped outside the nest once the ant realizes only the appendage is edible. Due to the costs of producing seeds with an appendage to attract ants, it is more energetically favorable for the plant to reproduce rhizomatously.

== Conservation ==
Asarum caudatum is not listed a species of concern. However, the habitat in which it is native is threatened in some regions by logging and other land uses.

== Toxicity ==
Members of the family Aristolochiaceae contain aristolochic acid, which has been recognized as a carcinogen.

== Uses ==
The root is edible in small amounts. Native Americans used the plant for various medicinal purposes.

Some describe using A. caudatum as a ginger substitute and as a tea with medicinal properties. In a study on its effects on fungus, A. caudatum had antifungal properties when tested against nine fungal species.
