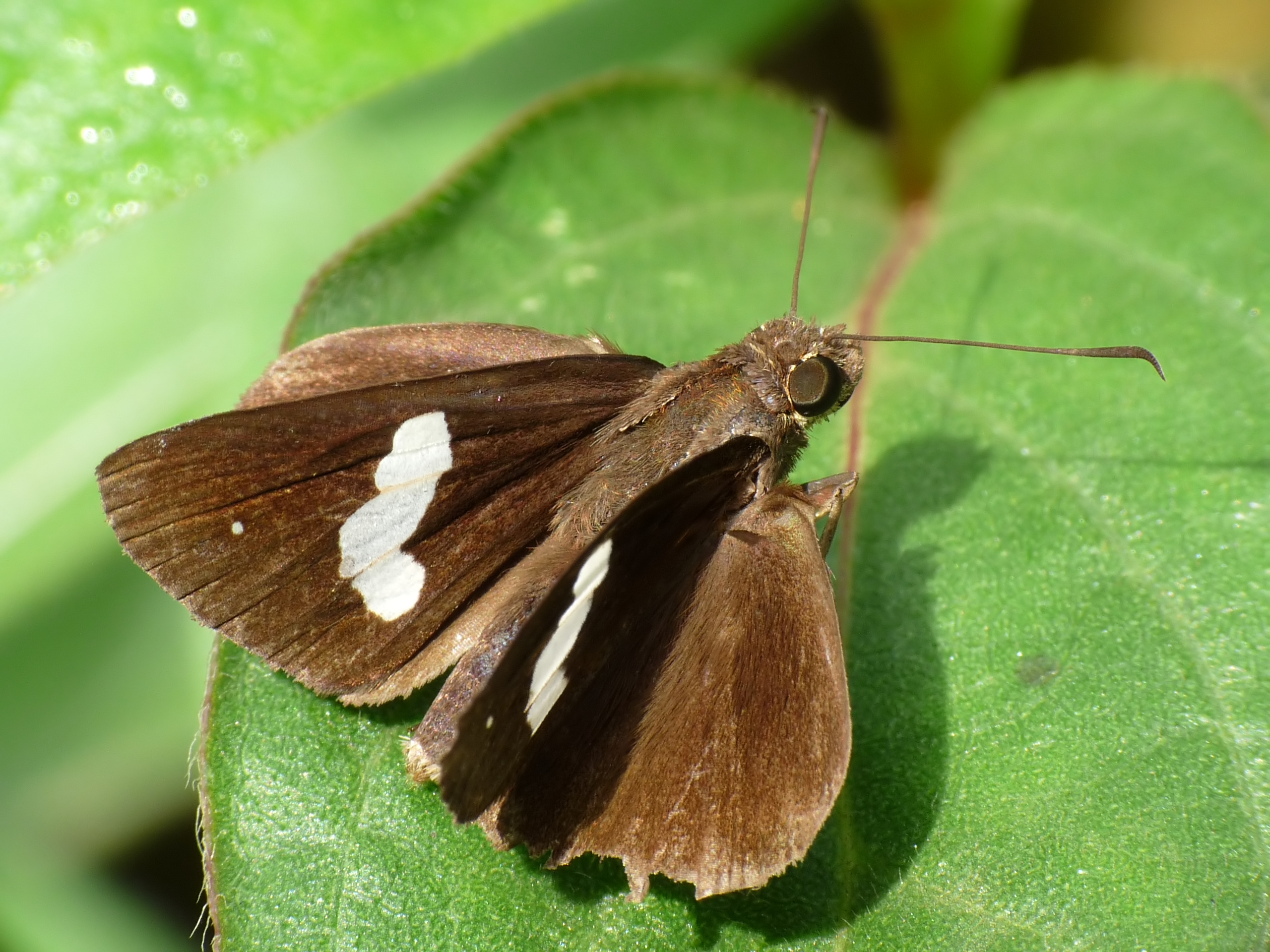
- Upper side
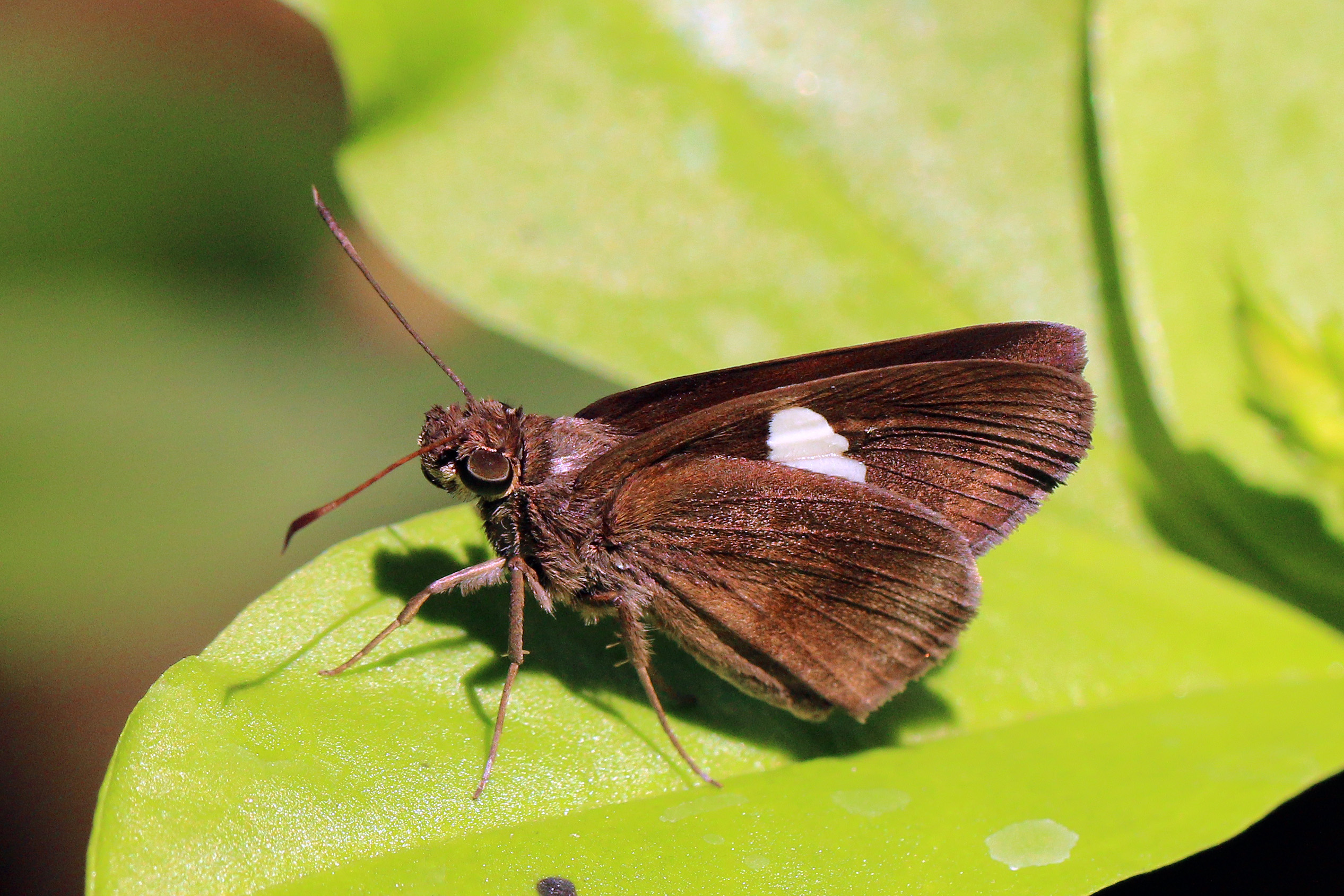
- Underside, Bali, Indonesia

Scientific classification
- Kingdom: Animalia
- Phylum: Arthropoda
- Class: Insecta
- Order: Lepidoptera
- Family: Hesperiidae
- Genus: Notocrypta
- Species: N. paralysos

Binomial name
- Notocrypta paralysos (Wood-Mason & de Nicéville, 1881)

= Notocrypta paralysos =

Common banded demon

Species of butterfly

Notocrypta paralysos, the banded demon or common banded demon, is a butterfly belonging to the family Hesperiidae found in Sri Lanka, India, Indo-China, Malay Peninsula, Sumatra, Java, Lesser Sunda Islands, Borneo, Palawan, Philippines, Sulawesi Region, and Maluku.

== Description ==
Male and Female. Very similar to Notocrypta feisthamelii, the wings somewhat shorter and broader, the post-medial white band of the forewing very similar both above and below, but there is a small white spot opposite the cell end, towards the outer margin, and there are no sub-apical dots, and on the underside of the hindwing there is a small white spot inside the end of the cell and another below it, nearly half way between it and the outer margin, and there is a white mark on each side of the face.

— Charles Swinhoe, Lepidoptera Indica. Vol. X
