= Wild ginger =

Wild ginger may refer to any of a variety of plants, often with a similar appearance, odour or taste to cultivated ginger. Species involved include:

- Any of the Alpinia species, especially A. caerulea, a large tropical flowering plant
- Any of the Asarum species, especially A. caudatum, a groundcover with kidney- or heart-shaped leaves and a small maroon flower and ginger-scented roots; native to North America
- Curcuma australasica, "Australian turmeric"
- Hedychium gardnerianum, Himalayan plant with fragrant yellow spiked flowers
- Siphonochilus aethiopicus, "African ginger," a rhizome with a showy purple flower with a yellow center
- Any of the numerous Zingiber species
