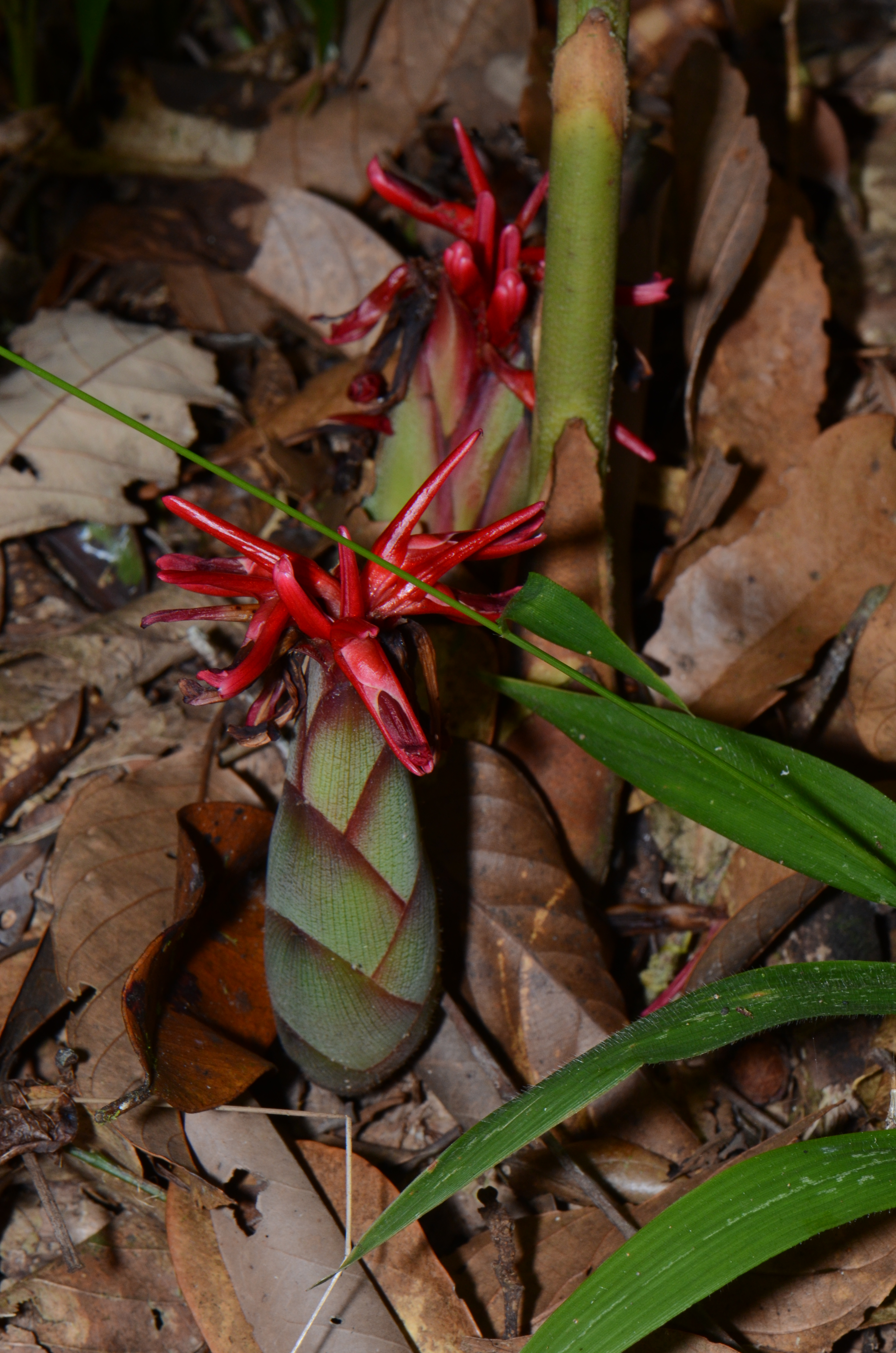
- Unidentified Hornstedtia

Scientific classification
- Kingdom: Plantae
- Clade: Tracheophytes
- Clade: Angiosperms
- Clade: Monocots
- Clade: Commelinids
- Order: Zingiberales
- Family: Zingiberaceae
- Subfamily: Alpinioideae
- Tribe: Alpinieae
- Genus: Hornstedtia; Retz.

Type species
- Hornstedtia scyphus Retz.

Synonyms
- Greenwaya Giseke; Donacodes Blume; Stenochasma Griff.

= Hornstedtia =

Genus of flowering plants

Hornstedtia is a genus of plants in the Zingiberaceae. It is native to Southeast Asia, the Himalayas, southern China, New Guinea, Melanesia and Queensland.

== Species ==
As accepted by Plants of the World Online;

- Hornstedtia affinis Ridl. - Sarawak
- Hornstedtia albomucronata Docot, Mazo & N.P.Mendez
- Hornstedtia annadeguzmaniae Naive & Alejandro
- Hornstedtia arunachalensis S.Tripathi & V.Prakash - Arunachal Pradesh
- Hornstedtia conica Ridl. - Borneo, Malaysia, Sumatra, Java
- Hornstedtia conoidea Ridl.
- Hornstedtia costata (Roxb.) K.Schum. in H.G.A.Engler - Bangladesh, Assam, Bhutan, Arunachal Pradesh
- Hornstedtia crispata Docot
- Hornstedtia cyathifera Valeton - New Guinea
- Hornstedtia deliana Valeton - Sumatra
- Hornstedtia elongata (Teijsm. & Binn.) K.Schum. in H.G.A.Engler - Java
- Hornstedtia garbosa Naive & Alejandro
- Hornstedtia gracilis R.M.Sm. - Sabah
- Hornstedtia hainanensis T.L.Wu & S.J.Chen - Hainan
- Hornstedtia havilandii (K.Schum.) K.Schum. in H.G.A.Engler - Borneo
- Hornstedtia incana R.M.Sm. - Borneo
- Hornstedtia irosinensis Elmer
- Hornstedtia leonurus (J.Koenig) Retz. - Peninsular Malaysia, Sarawak
- Hornstedtia lophophora Ridl.
- Hornstedtia merahjambu Angela, Tawan & Meekiong
- Hornstedtia microcheila Ridl.
- Hornstedtia minor (Blume) Valeton - Peninsular Malaysia, Java, Borneo
- Hornstedtia minuta (Blume) K.Schum. in H.G.A.Engler - Java
- Hornstedtia mollis (Blume) Valeton - Java
- Hornstedtia olivacea Docot & Pranada
- Hornstedtia paludosa (Blume) K.Schum. in H.G.A.Engler - Java
- Hornstedtia parviflora Ridl. - Mentawai
- Hornstedtia phaeochoana (K.Schum.) K.Schum. in H.G.A.Engler - Johor, Sarawak
- Hornstedtia pininga (Blume) Valeton - Borneo, Java, Sumatra
- Hornstedtia pusilla Ridl. - Pahang
- Hornstedtia putih Angela, Tawan & Meekiong
- Hornstedtia reticosa Valeton - Sumatra
- Hornstedtia reticulata (K.Schum.) K.Schum.
- Hornstedtia rubra (Blume) Valeton - Java, Sumatra
- Hornstedtia rubrolutea Ridl. - Thailand
- Hornstedtia rumphii (Sm.) Valeton - Maluku
- Hornstedtia sanhan M.F.Newman - Vietnam
- Hornstedtia scottiana (F.Muell.) K.Schum. in H.G.A.Engler - Maluku, New Guinea, Queensland, Bismarck Archipelago, Solomon Islands, Vanuatu
- Hornstedtia scyphifera (J.Koenig) Steud. - Borneo, Java, Sumatra
- Hornstedtia striolata Ridl. - Selangor
- Hornstedtia tomentosa (Blume) Bakh.f. - Borneo, Java
- Hornstedtia triloba Ridl. - Kalimantan
