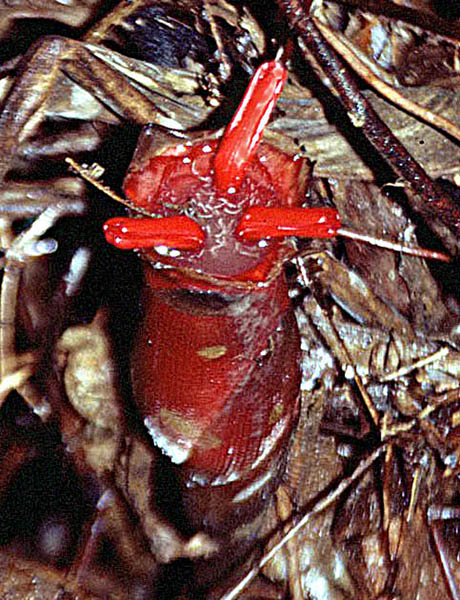

Scientific classification
- Kingdom: Plantae
- Clade: Tracheophytes
- Clade: Angiosperms
- Clade: Monocots
- Clade: Commelinids
- Order: Zingiberales
- Family: Zingiberaceae
- Genus: Hornstedtia
- Species: H. scyphifera

Binomial name
- Hornstedtia scyphifera (J.Koenig) Steud.

Synonyms
- Amomum scyphiferum J.Koenig 1783; Cardamomum scyphiferum (J.Koenig) Kuntze 1891; Greenwaya scyphifer (J.Koenig) Giseke 1792

= Hornstedtia scyphifera =

Species of plant

Hornstedtia scyphifera, commonly called walking ginger, is a flowering plant in the ginger family Zingiberaceae. It is native to the Malay Peninsula, Borneo, Sumatra, and Java. Its growth form is like a tiny banyan, growing horizontally as it grows prop roots approximately 1 m (3 ft 3 in) long down to the ground as the plant lengthens.

Three varieties are accepted:

- H. s. var. scyphifera
- H. s. var. fusiformis
- H. s. var. grandis
