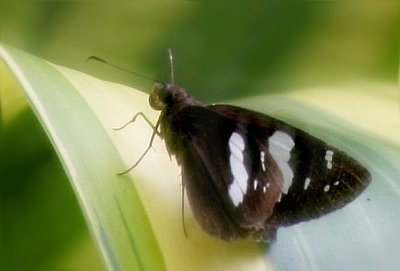
- Restricted demon, Notocrypta curvifascia

Scientific classification
- Kingdom: Animalia
- Phylum: Arthropoda
- Class: Insecta
- Order: Lepidoptera
- Family: Hesperiidae
- Tribe: Ancistroidini
- Genus: Notocrypta de Nicéville, 1889

Species
- Numerous, see text

= Notocrypta =

Genus of butterflies

Notocrypta is a genus of skipper butterflies. It is one of several closely related genera commonly called "demons". The genus is found in the Australasian and Indomalayan realms.

== Notable species ==
- Restricted demon, Notocrypta curvifascia
- Spotted demon, Notocrypta feisthamelii
- Common banded demon, Notocrypta paralysos
- Notocrypta waigensis
