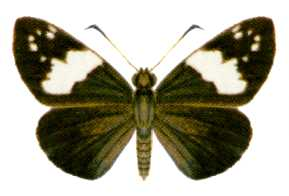

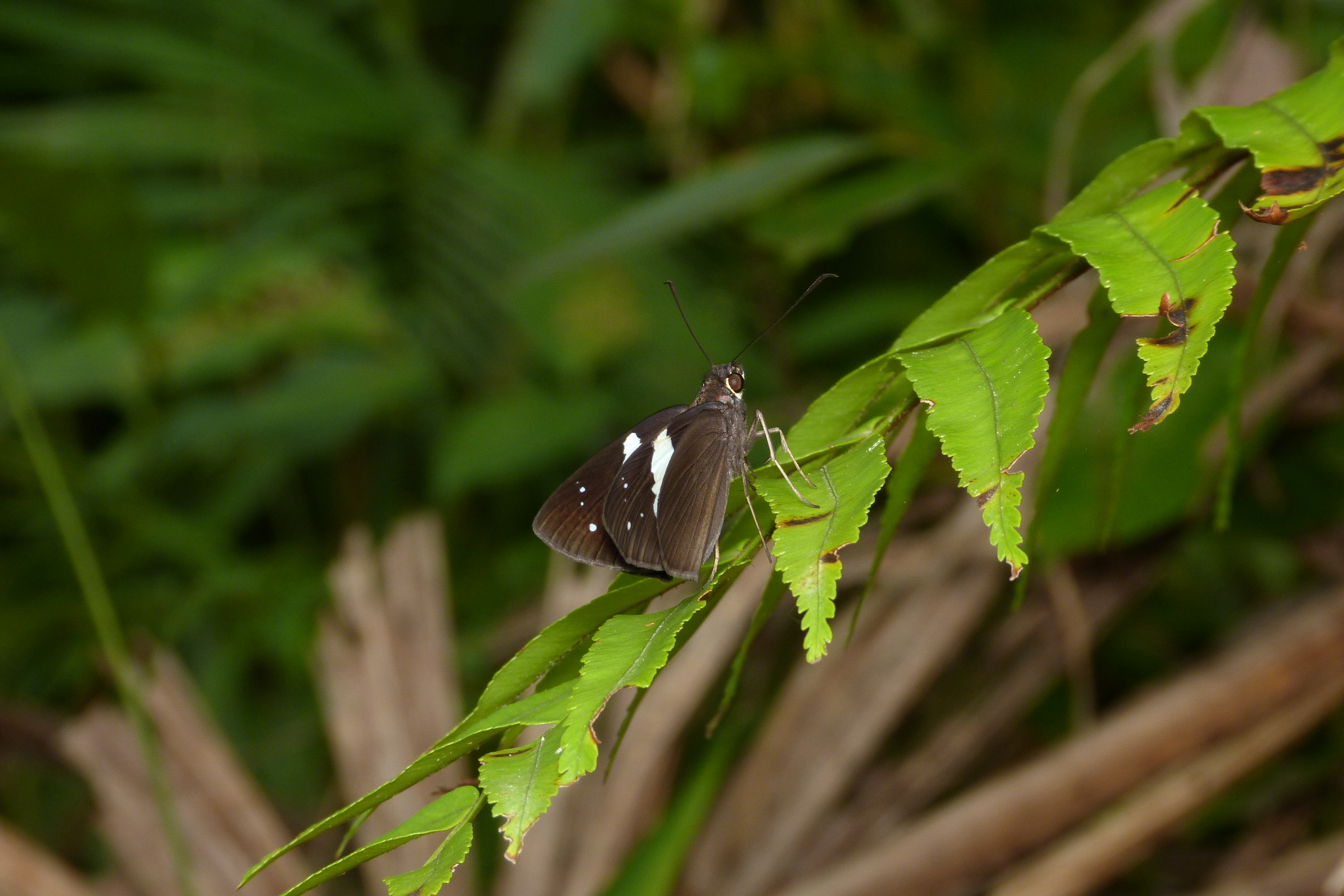

Scientific classification
- Domain: Eukaryota
- Kingdom: Animalia
- Phylum: Arthropoda
- Class: Insecta
- Order: Lepidoptera
- Family: Hesperiidae
- Genus: Notocrypta
- Species: N. waigensis

Binomial name
- Notocrypta waigensis (Plötz, 1882)

Synonyms
- Plesioneura waigensis Plötz, 1882; Plesioneura proserpina Butler, 1883; Plesioneura leucogaster Staudinger, 1889; Notocrypta ribbei Fruhstorfer, 1911; Notocrypta mangala Fruhstorfer, 1911; Celaenorrhinus klossi Rothschild, 1915

= Notocrypta waigensis =

Species of butterfly

The banded demon (Notocrypta waigensis) is a species of butterfly of the family Hesperiidae. It is found in Indonesia (Irian Jaya, Aru Islands, Kei Islands), New Guinea and Queensland. The wingspan is about 40 millimetres (1.6 in). The larvae feed on various Zingiberaceae species, including Alpinia caerulea and Hornstedtia scottiana.

== Subspecies ==
- Notocrypta waigensis waigensis
- Notocrypta waigensis proserpina
