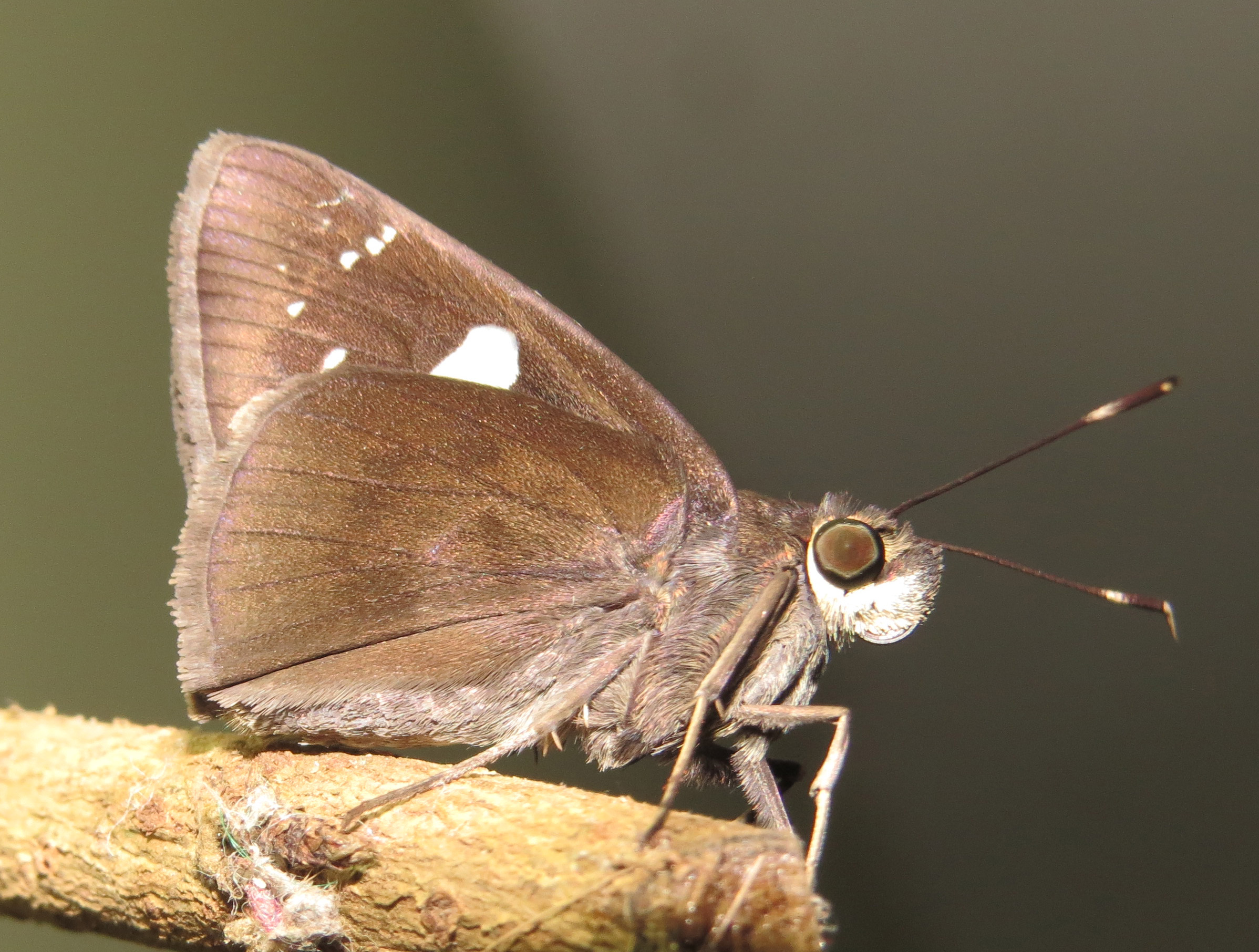
- From Wayanad, Kerala, India

Scientific classification
- Kingdom: Animalia
- Phylum: Arthropoda
- Class: Insecta
- Order: Lepidoptera
- Family: Hesperiidae
- Genus: Notocrypta
- Species: N. curvifascia

Binomial name
- Notocrypta curvifascia (Felder & Felder, 1862)

= Notocrypta curvifascia =

Restricted demon

Species of butterfly

Notocrypta curvifascia, the restricted demon, is a butterfly belonging to the family Hesperiidae. N. curvifascia is commonly found in many regions of temperate and tropical East Asia, Indonesia, and the Indian subcontinent.

Among butterflies, it is relatively small, at approximately 4 cm long (adult). Its wings are dark brown to black, with a white eyespot near the trailing end.

== Host plants ==
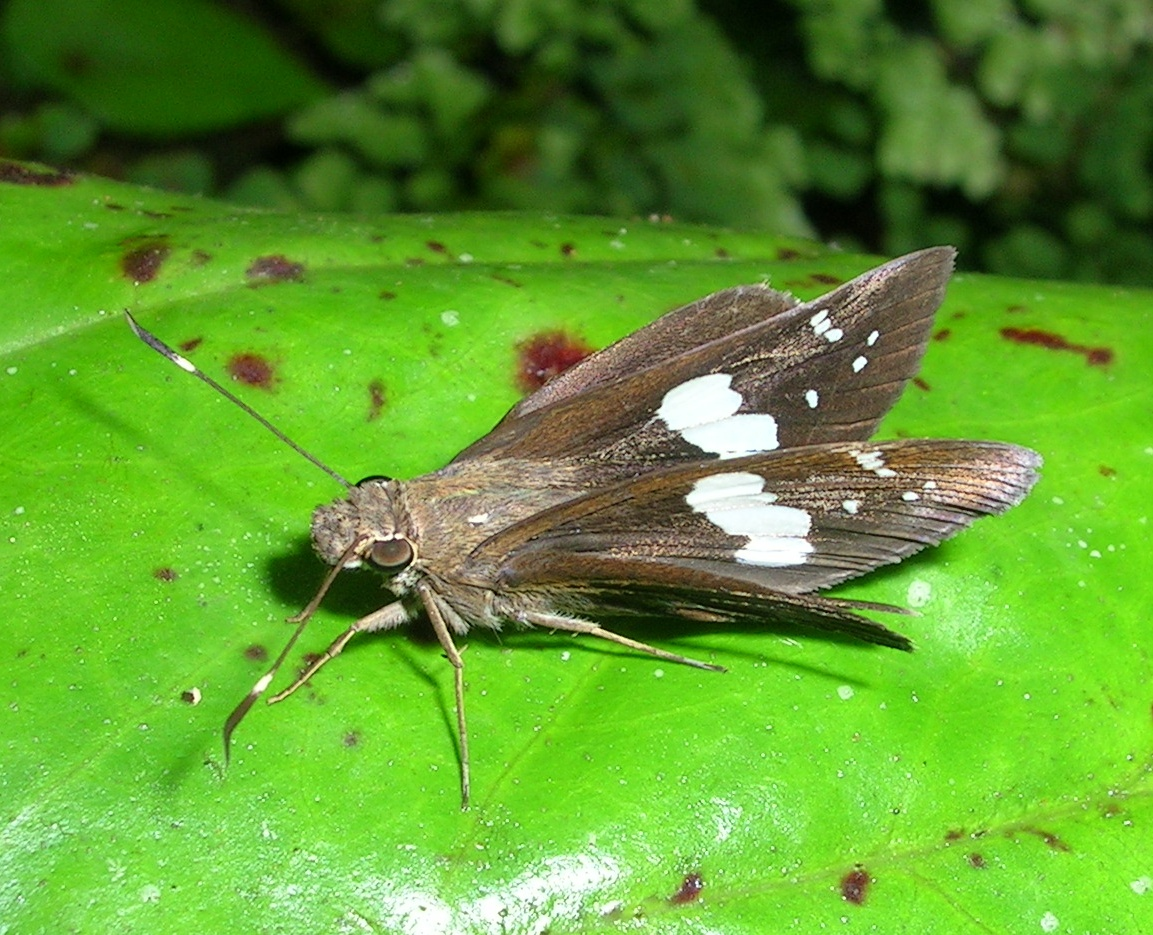

The larval host plants include members of the Zingiberaceae and Musaceae families such as Alpinia japonica, Alpinia zerumbet, Curcuma decipiens, Costus speciosus, Curcuma longa, Globba marantina, Musa acuminata × balbisiana, Zingiber casumunar, Zingiber odoriferum, Zingiber officinale. Other plants include Hedychium species and Zingiber zerumbet.
