= Hornstedtia costata =

Scientific classification
- Kingdom: Plantae
- Clade: Tracheophytes
- Clade: Angiosperms
- Clade: Monocots
- Clade: Commelinids
- Order: Zingiberales
- Family: Zingiberaceae
- Subfamily: Alpinioideae
- Tribe: Alpinieae
- Genus: Hornstedtia
- Species: H. costata

Binomial name
- Hornstedtia costata (Roxb.) K.Schum.

Synonyms
- Achasma costatum (Thunb.) Gagnep.; Alpinia cardamomum-medium (Wight & Arn.) Gagnep.; Alpinia costata var. quinquefoliola W.T.Wang; Alpinia media Miq.; Amomum costatum Steud.; Cardamomum costatum (Thunb.) Willd.; Cardamomum medium Blume; Elettaria costata B.Heyne; Elettaria media (Wight & Arn.) B.Heyne ex Planch.; Gethyra cardamomum-medium M.A.Lawson

Species of flowering plant

Hornstedtia costata is a ginger-like plant (member of the family Zingiberaceae) native to Bangladesh, Assam, Bhutan, Arunachal Pradesh. Previously this species has been placed in the genera Alpinia and Amomum.
