= Hornstedtia havilandii =

Scientific classification
- Kingdom: Plantae
- Clade: Tracheophytes
- Clade: Angiosperms
- Clade: Monocots
- Clade: Commelinids
- Order: Zingiberales
- Family: Zingiberaceae
- Genus: Hornstedtia
- Species: H. havilandii

Binomial name
- Hornstedtia havilandii (K.Schum.) K.Schum.

Species of flowering plant

Hornstedtia havilandii, also known as panyun (in Iban) or telidus (in Sabah), is a species of flowering plant, a perennial tropical forest herb in the ginger family, that is endemic to Borneo.

== Description ==
The species grows as a clump of leafy shoots forming pseudostems to 3–4 m in height from branching rhizomes. The inflorescence, 20–40 cm tall, rises directly from the rhizome. The flowers are red with white lips. The rectangular, edible fruits, 3 x 1.5 cm, ripen cream to yellow, containing many small black seeds in a translucent whitish aril.

== Distribution and habitat ==
The species is found in the lowland and mixed dipterocarp forest, as well as riparian forest, at elevations of up to 1,000 m.

== Usage ==
The species is rarely cultivated. The fruits have a passionfruit flavour and are eaten raw. The shoots may be cooked and eaten as a vegetable.
