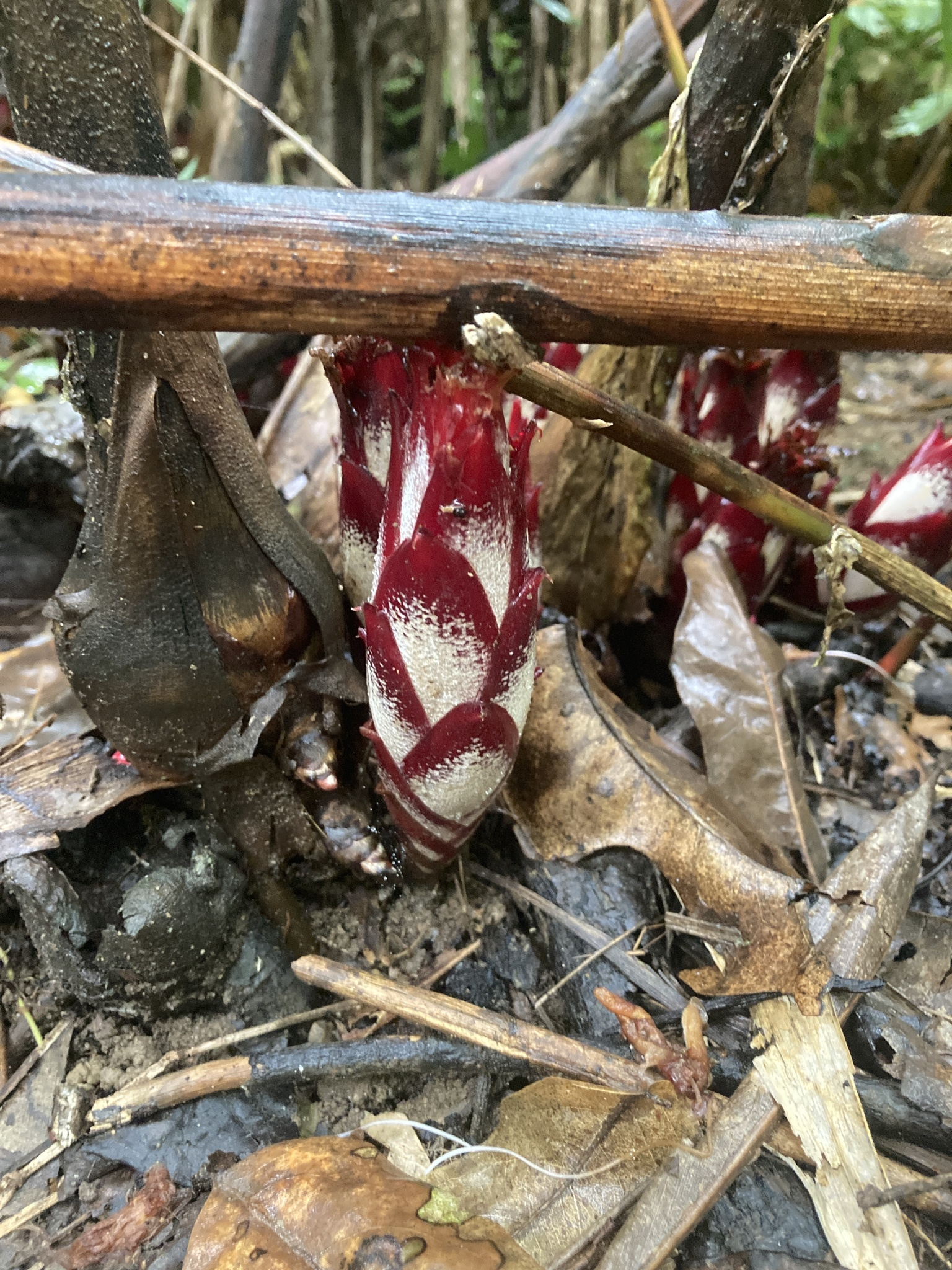

Scientific classification
- Kingdom: Plantae
- Clade: Embryophytes
- Clade: Tracheophytes
- Clade: Spermatophytes
- Clade: Angiosperms
- Clade: Monocots
- Clade: Commelinids
- Order: Zingiberales
- Family: Zingiberaceae
- Genus: Hornstedtia
- Species: H. scottiana

Binomial name
- Hornstedtia scottiana (F.Muell.) K.Schum.

= Hornstedtia scottiana =

Species of flowering plant

Hornstedtia scottiana, common known as Scott's ginger, jiddo, or native cardamom, is a very large ginger (member of the family Zingiberaceae) native to Queensland (Australia), New Guinea and the Maluku Islands. Its fruits are eaten by the cassowary. It is also a food plant for the larval stages of the banded demon butterfly.

== Taxonomy ==
It was first described in 1874 by Ferdinand von Mueller as Elettaria scottiana from a specimen found in the rainforest in Rockingham's Bay by John Dallachy. In 1904, it was redescribed as belonging to the genus, Hornstedtia, by Karl Moritz Schumann.

== See also ==
- Domesticated plants and animals of Austronesia
