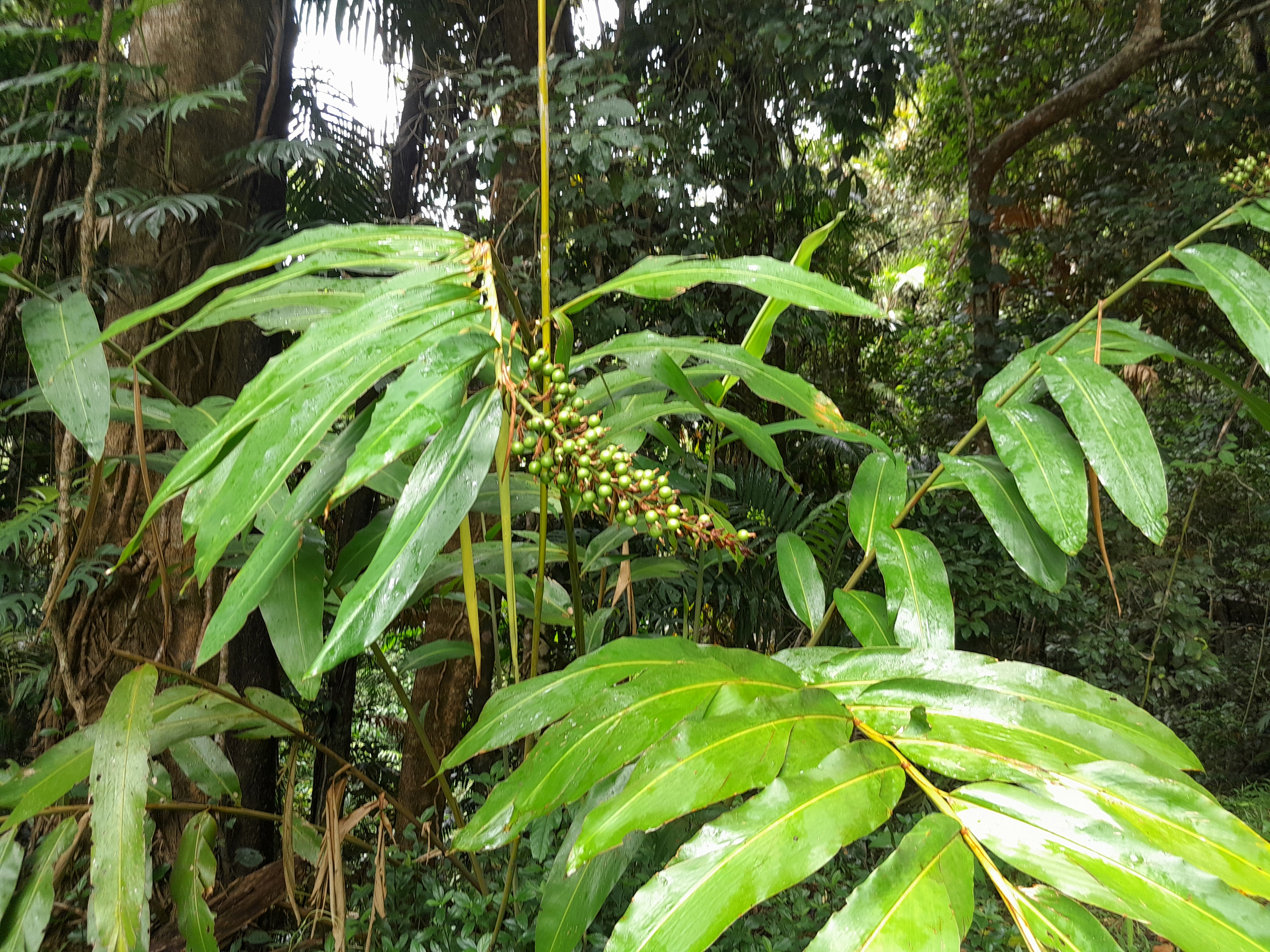
- Foliage and fruit

Conservation status
- Least Concern (NCA)

Scientific classification
- Kingdom: Plantae
- Clade: Tracheophytes
- Clade: Angiosperms
- Clade: Monocots
- Clade: Commelinids
- Order: Zingiberales
- Family: Zingiberaceae
- Genus: Alpinia
- Species: A. caerulea

Binomial name
- Alpinia caerulea (R.Br.) Benth.

Synonyms
- Hellenia caerulea R.Br.

= Alpinia caerulea =

Native ginger

Species of plant in the family Zingiberaceae

Alpinia caerulea, commonly known as native ginger or Australian ginger, is an understorey perennial herb in the family Zingiberaceae which grows in rainforest, gallery forest and wet sclerophyll forests in eastern Australia.

== Description ==
Alpinia caerulea is a rhizomatous plant with arching stalks growing to 2–3 m (6 ft 7 in – 9 ft 10 in) long. Each carries a number of large alternately arranged leaves up to 40 cm (16 in) long and 10 cm (3.9 in) wide. They are either sessile or with a very short petiole, glossy dark green above and lighter below, with an acuminate tip.

The inflorescence is terminal on the stalks, up to 30 cm (12 in) long and contains numerous white flowers. The fruit is a capsule, blue, globose and about 1 cm (0.39 in) diameter. The casing is thin and brittle, containing numerous black seeds set in white pith.

Flowering occurs from September to April, and the fruit may ripen in any month.

== Taxonomy ==
This species was first described – albeit very briefly – in 1810 by the Scottish botanist Robert Brown, who gave it the name Hellenia caerulea. The English botanist George Bentham reviewed the taxon in 1873 and gave it a much more detailed description, as well as the new combination Alpinia caerulea. It was published in the book Flora australiensis: a description of the plants of the Australian territory.

=== Etymology ===
The genus name Alpinia was coined by Carl Linnaeus in honour of the Italian botanist Prospero Alpini, and the species epithet caerulea is derived from the Latin word caeruleus, meaning blue, which is a reference to the fruit colour.

=== Vernacular names ===
This plant is known as Jun jun by the Kuku Yalanji people of coastal north east Queensland.

== Distribution and habitat ==
The native ginger is endemic to New South Wales and Queensland, Australia. The natural range is from the Gosford district north along the coast to the tip of Cape York Peninsula and the islands of the Torres Strait (see map of sightings in the External links section below). It grows in coastal and sub-coastal rainforest and wet sclerophyll forest, commonly beside waterways. The altitudinal range is from sea level to around 1,400 m (4,590 ft).

It is thought that the species might also occur in New Guinea.

== Ecology ==
Alpinia caerulea is one of the host species for larvae of the banded demon butterfly (Notocrypta waigensis). The fruits are popular with a variety of birds including brush turkeys (Alectura lathami), southern cassowaries (Casuarius casuarius), crimson rosellas (Platycercus elegans), king parrots (Alisterus scapularis), regent bowerbirds (Sericulus chrysocephalus), satin bowerbirds (Ptilonorhynchus violaceus), and Lewin's honeyeaters (Meliphaga lewinii). Some Australian rodents also eat the fruit, including giant white-tailed rats (Uromys caudimaculatus) and fawn-footed melomys (Melomys cervinipes).

== Conservation ==
This species is listed by the Queensland Department of Environment and Science as least concern. As of 10 May 2023, it has not been assessed by the International Union for Conservation of Nature (IUCN).

== Uses ==
For the Kuku Yalanji people of far northern Queensland, this plant had many uses – the fruit and rhizomes were eaten, the leaves were used to cover their shelters and to wrap meat when cooking in earth ovens.

New shoots are also edible, and have a mild ginger flavour. The white flesh surrounding the seeds is crisp and acidic, and during long walks it was chewed by Indigenous Australians to activate the salivary glands and moisten the mouth, with the seeds usually being discarded.

== Gallery ==
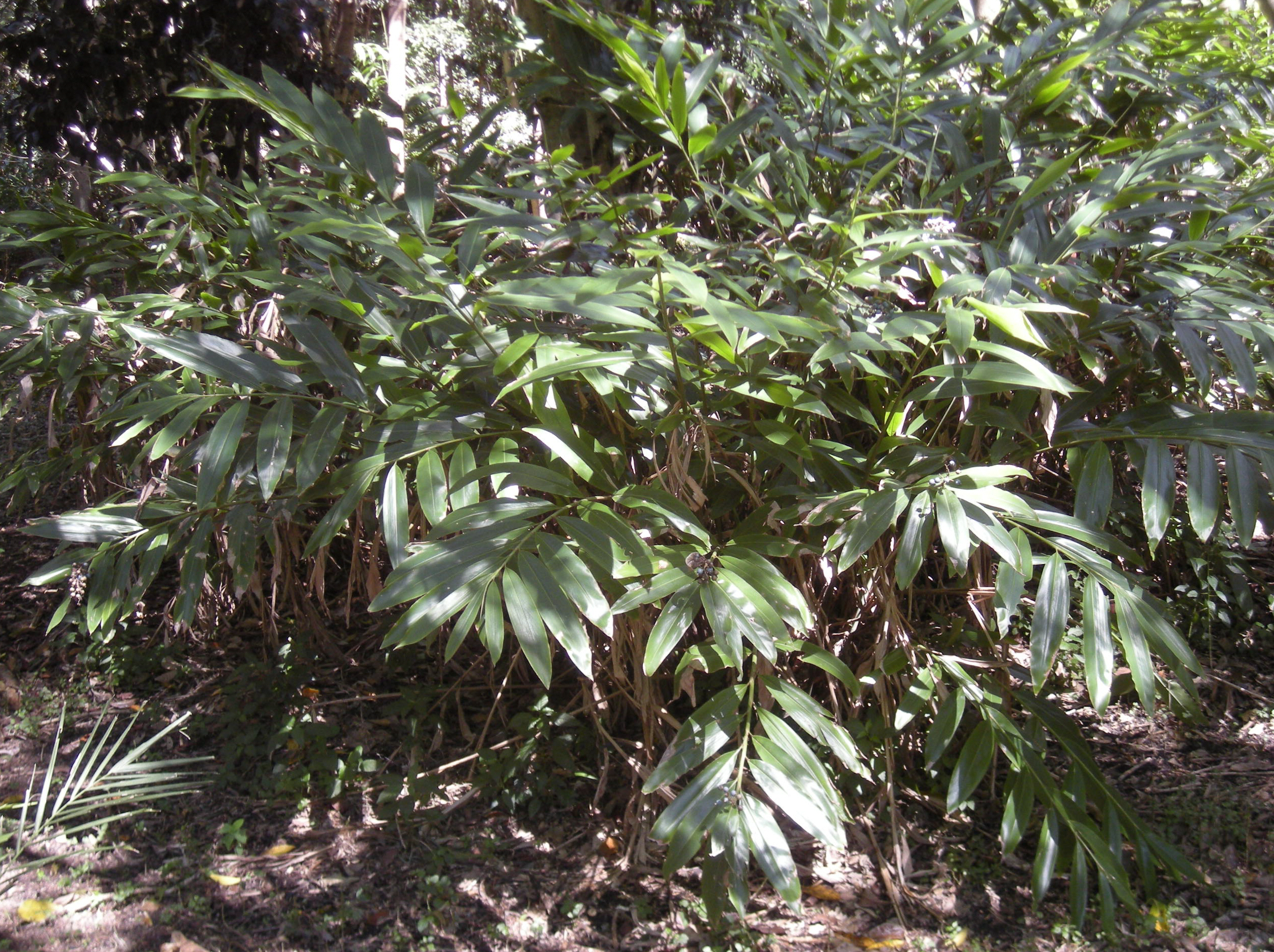
Habit

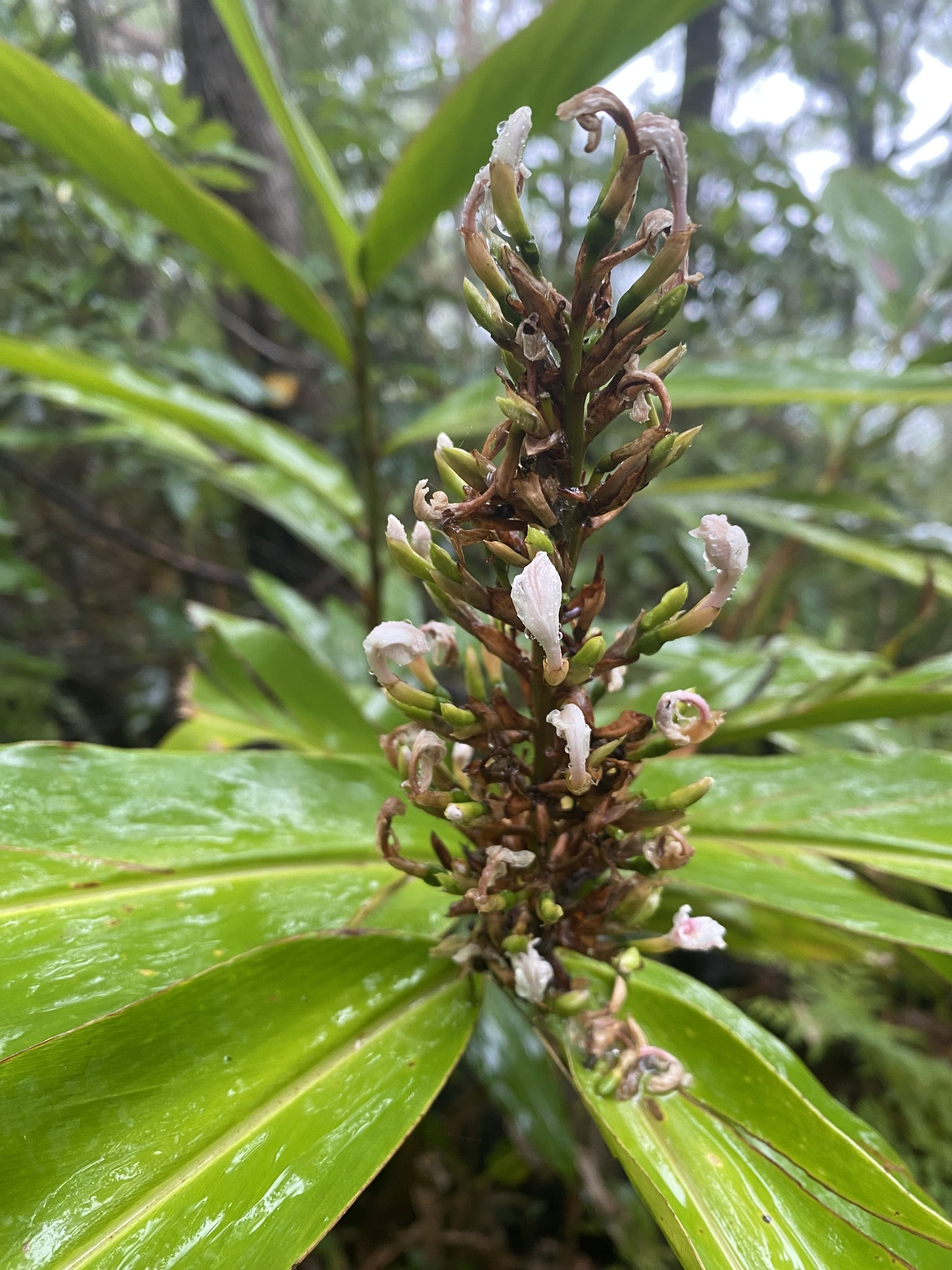
Inflorescence

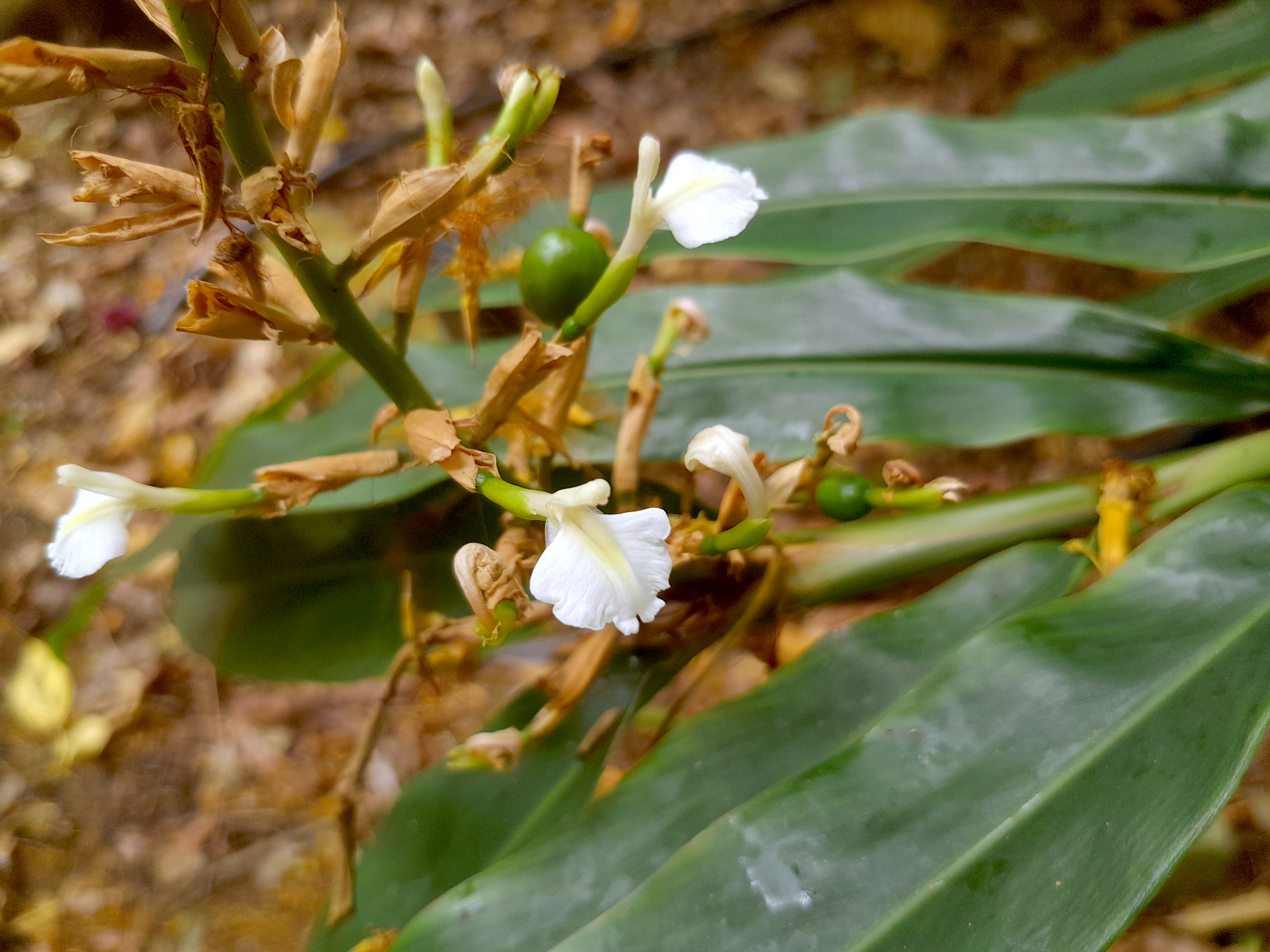
Flowers

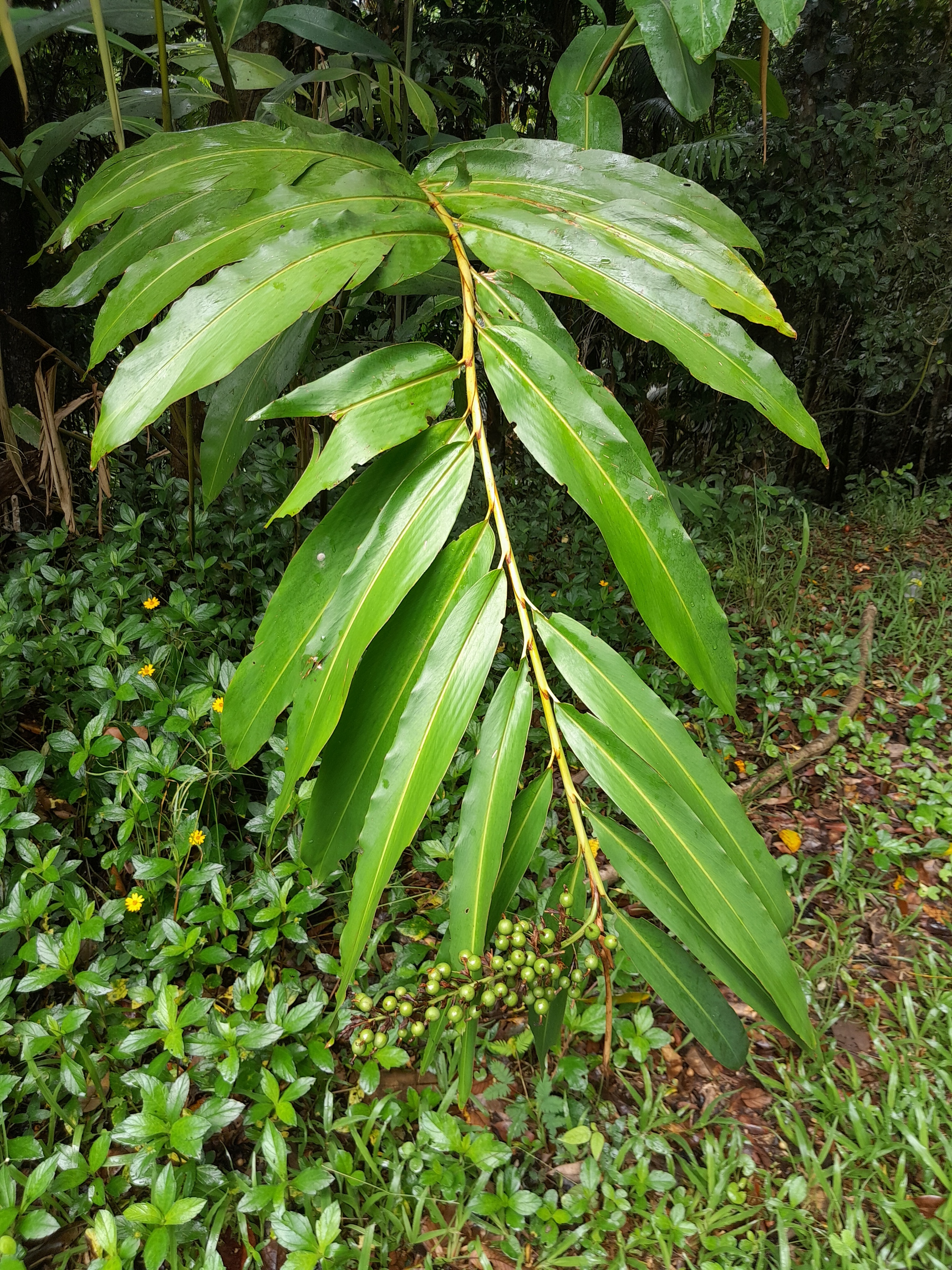
Foliage and immature fruit

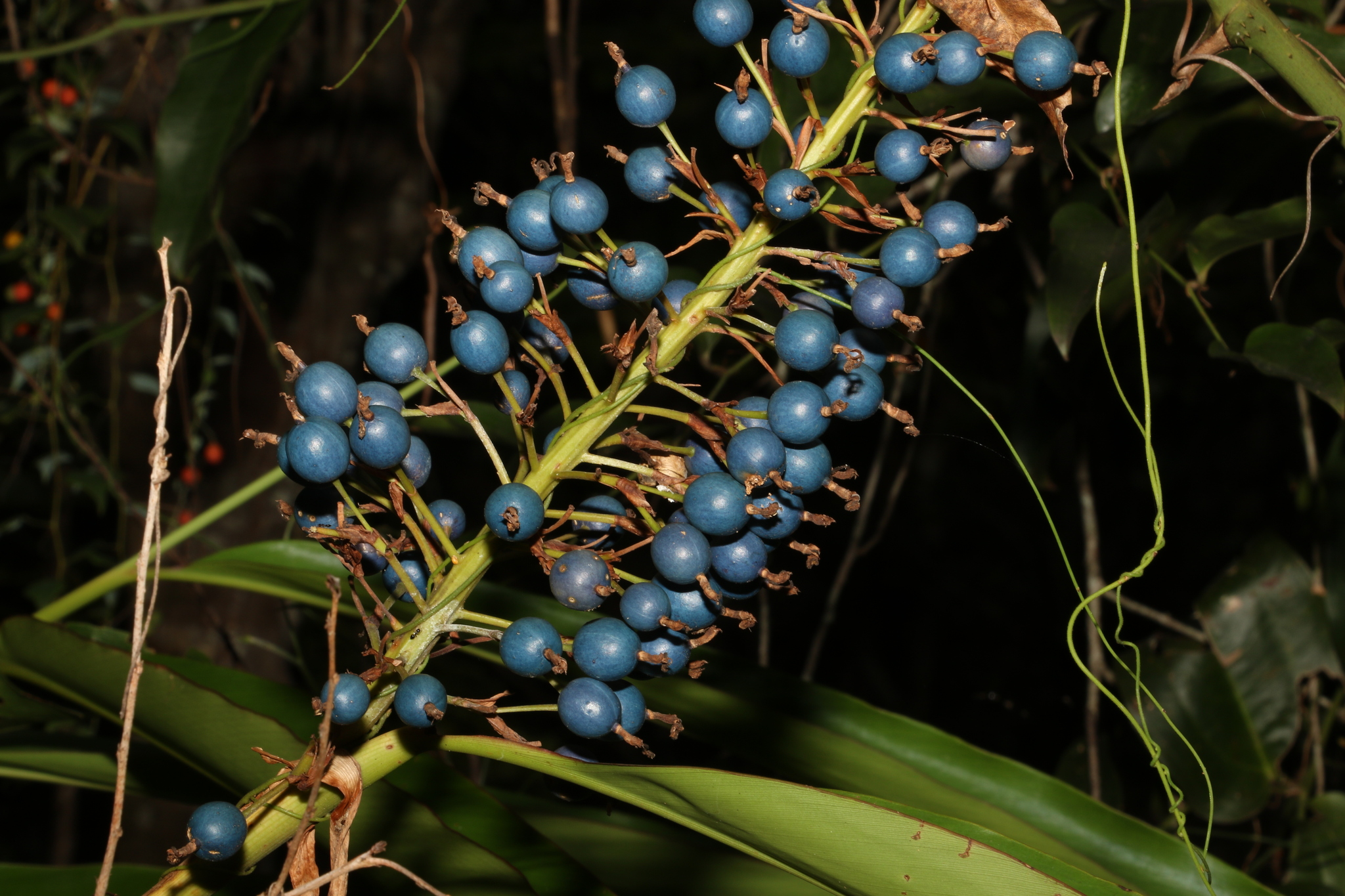
Ripe fruit

== See also ==
- List of Australian herbs and spices
