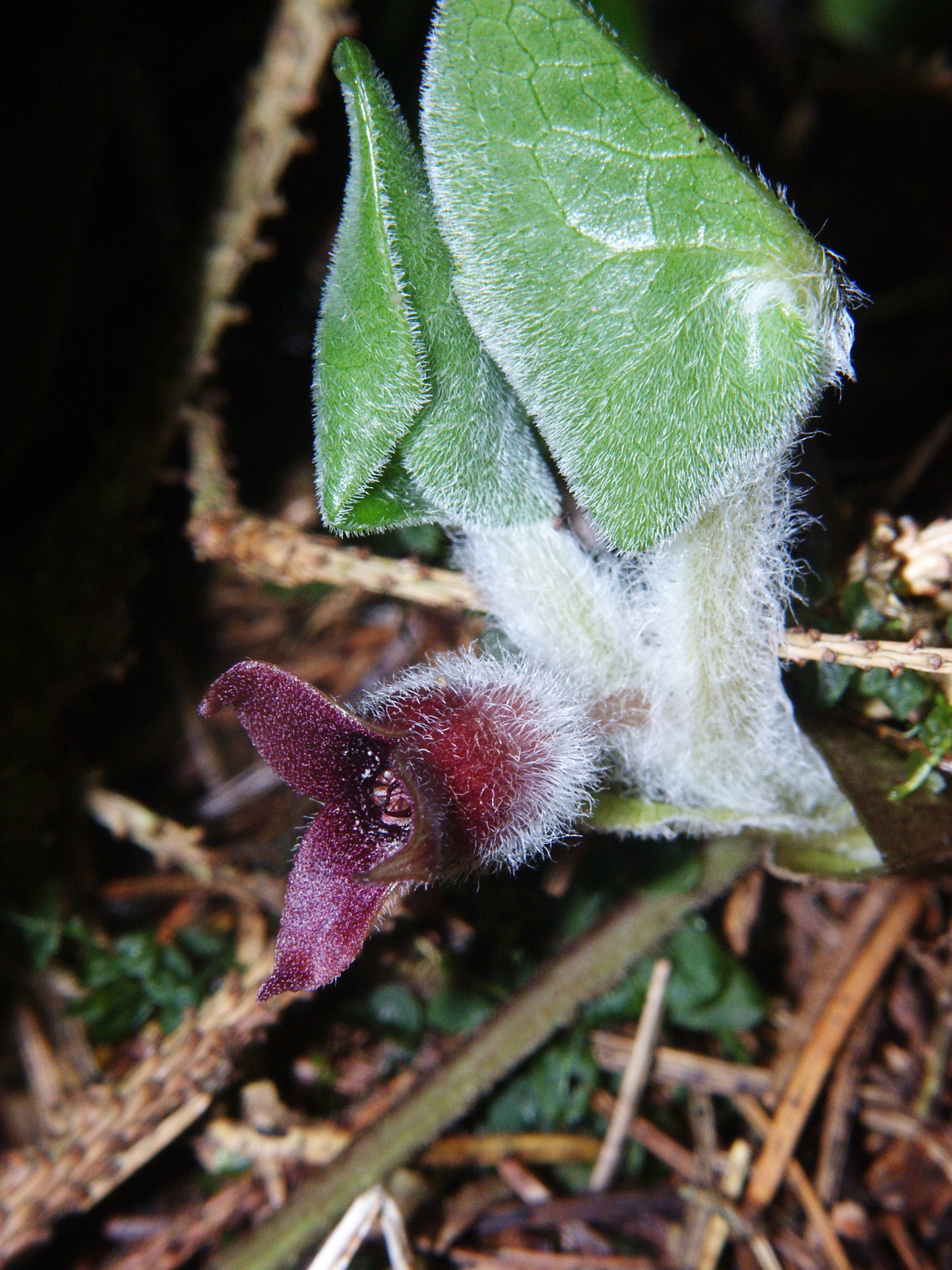
- Flower and emerging spring leaves on a specimen from the Schwäbisch-Fränkischer Forest in Germany

Scientific classification
- Kingdom: Plantae
- Clade: Tracheophytes
- Clade: Angiosperms
- Clade: Magnoliids
- Order: Piperales
- Family: Aristolochiaceae
- Genus: Asarum
- Species: A. europaeum

Binomial name
- Asarum europaeum L.

= Asarum europaeum =

Species of flowering plant

Asarum europaeum, known as asarabacca, European wild ginger, hazelwort, and wild spikenard, historically cabarick, is a species of flowering plant in the birthwort family Aristolochiaceae, native to parts of temperate Europe, and also cultivated in gardens. It is a creeping evergreen perennial with glossy green, kidney shaped leaves and solitary dull purple flowers hidden by the leaves. Though its roots have a ginger aroma, it is not closely related to the true culinary ginger Zingiber officinale. European wild ginger is sometimes harvested for use as a spice or a flavoring. In former days, it was used in snuff and also medicinally as an emetic and cathartic. The FDA warns against consuming Asarum, as it is nephrotoxic and contains the potent carcinogen aristolochic acid.

== Description ==
The prostrate stems are 10–15 centimetres (3.9–5.9 in) long, each bearing two reniform leaves with long petioles. The leaves are about 10 cm wide. The upper surface of the leaves is shiny, and they have a pepper-like taste and smell. There are also 2 to 3 stipules present that occur in two rows opposite each other on the stem. The flowers are solitary, terminal and nodding. The flower tube is composed of fused tepals that ends with 3 petal-like projections that are brownish towards their ends and dark purple toward the centre. There are 12 stamens present. The flowers emerge in the late winter and spring.

== Distribution and habitat ==
Asarum europaeum has a wide distribution in Europe. It ranges from southern Finland and northern Russia south to southern France, Italy, the former Yugoslavia, and Bulgaria. It is absent from the British Isles and Scandinavia, and also from northwestern Germany and the Netherlands. Within Europe, the plant is grown outside of its range in the United Kingdom, Denmark, Sweden, Norway and the Netherlands.

It occurs mostly in deciduous woodland or coniferous forests, especially in calcareous (chalky) soils.

== Subspecies ==
There are two recognised subspecies other than the type, including A. europaeum ssp. caucasicum, which is confined to the southwestern Alps, and A. europaeum ssp. italicum, which is found in central and northern Italy as well as in the Skopska Crna Gora mountains of North Macedonia and Kosovo.

== Cultivation ==
A. europaeum is quite shade-tolerant and is often employed as groundcover where little else will grow. This plant has gained the Royal Horticultural Society's Award of Garden Merit.

== Photo gallery ==
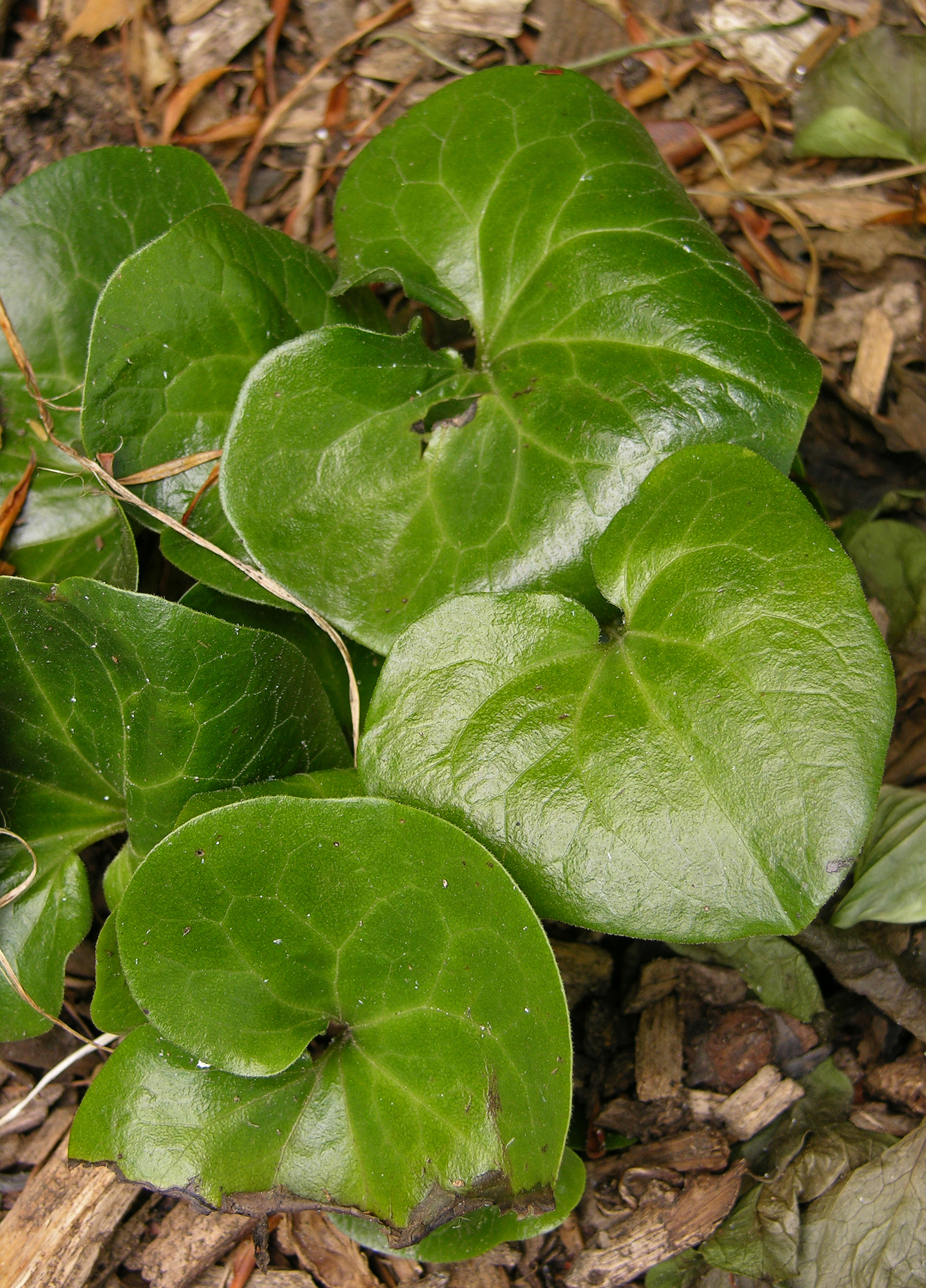
Leaves

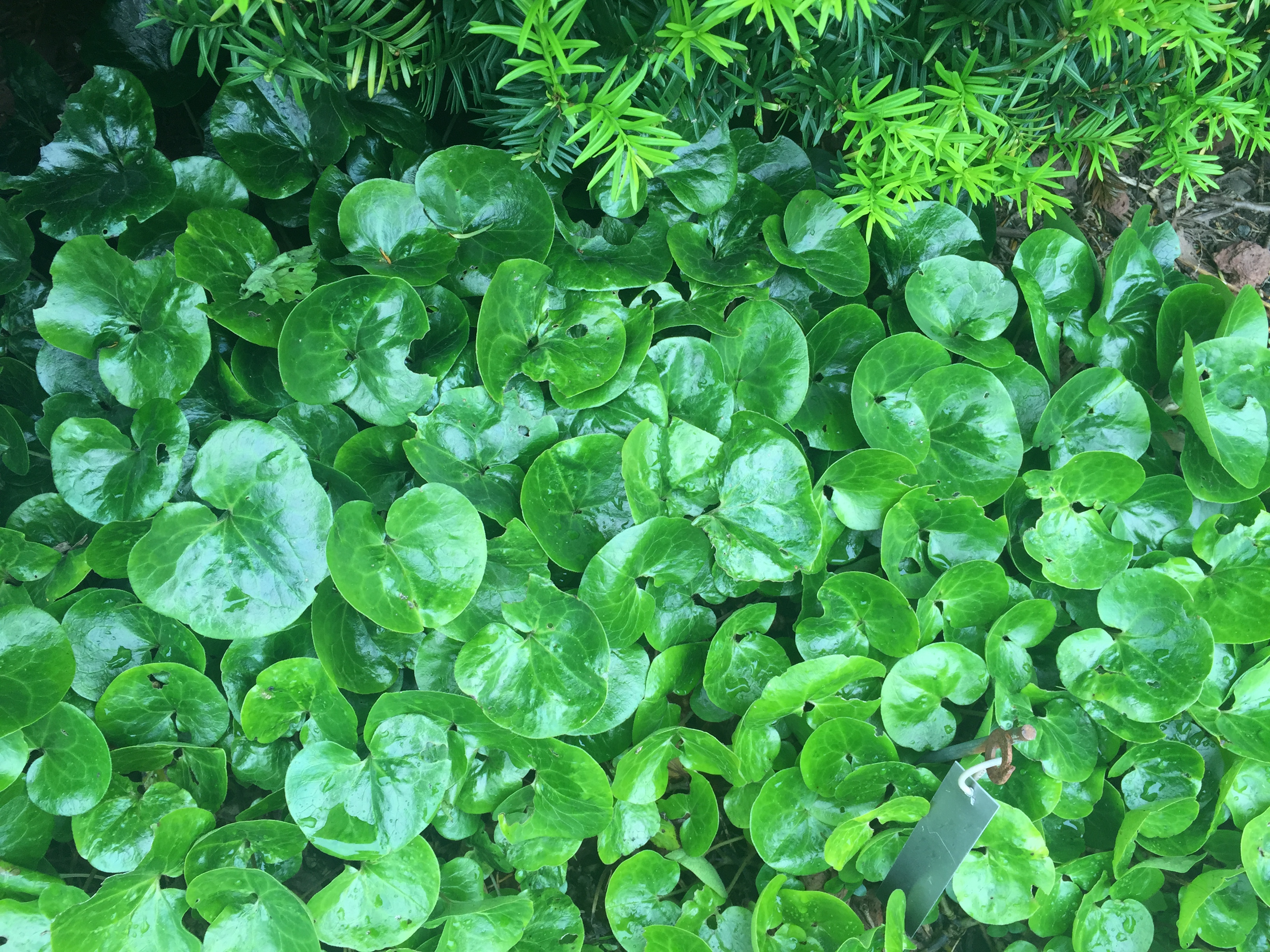
A. Europaeum in the UBC Botanical Garden

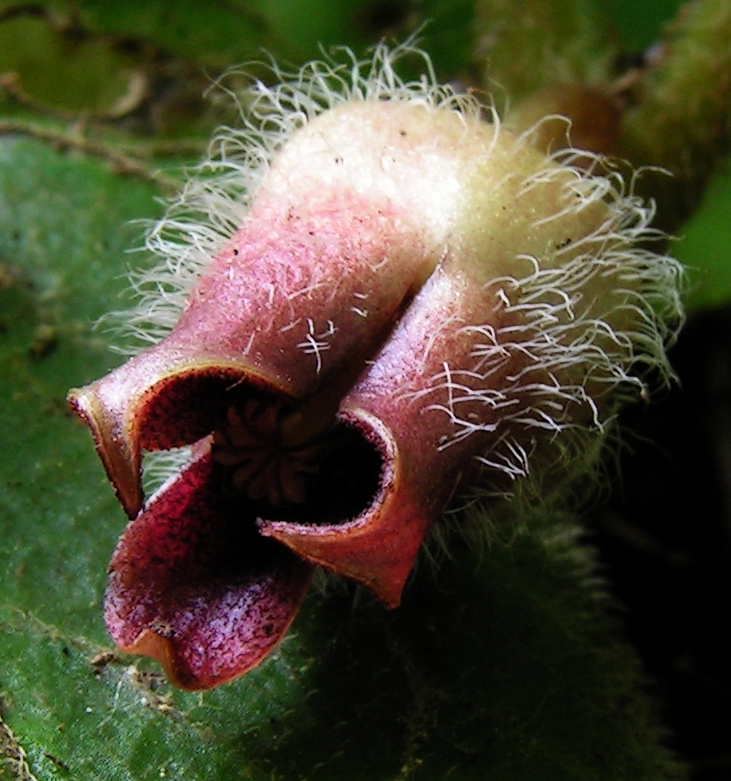
Flower, Moscow region, Russia (Bff 2010)

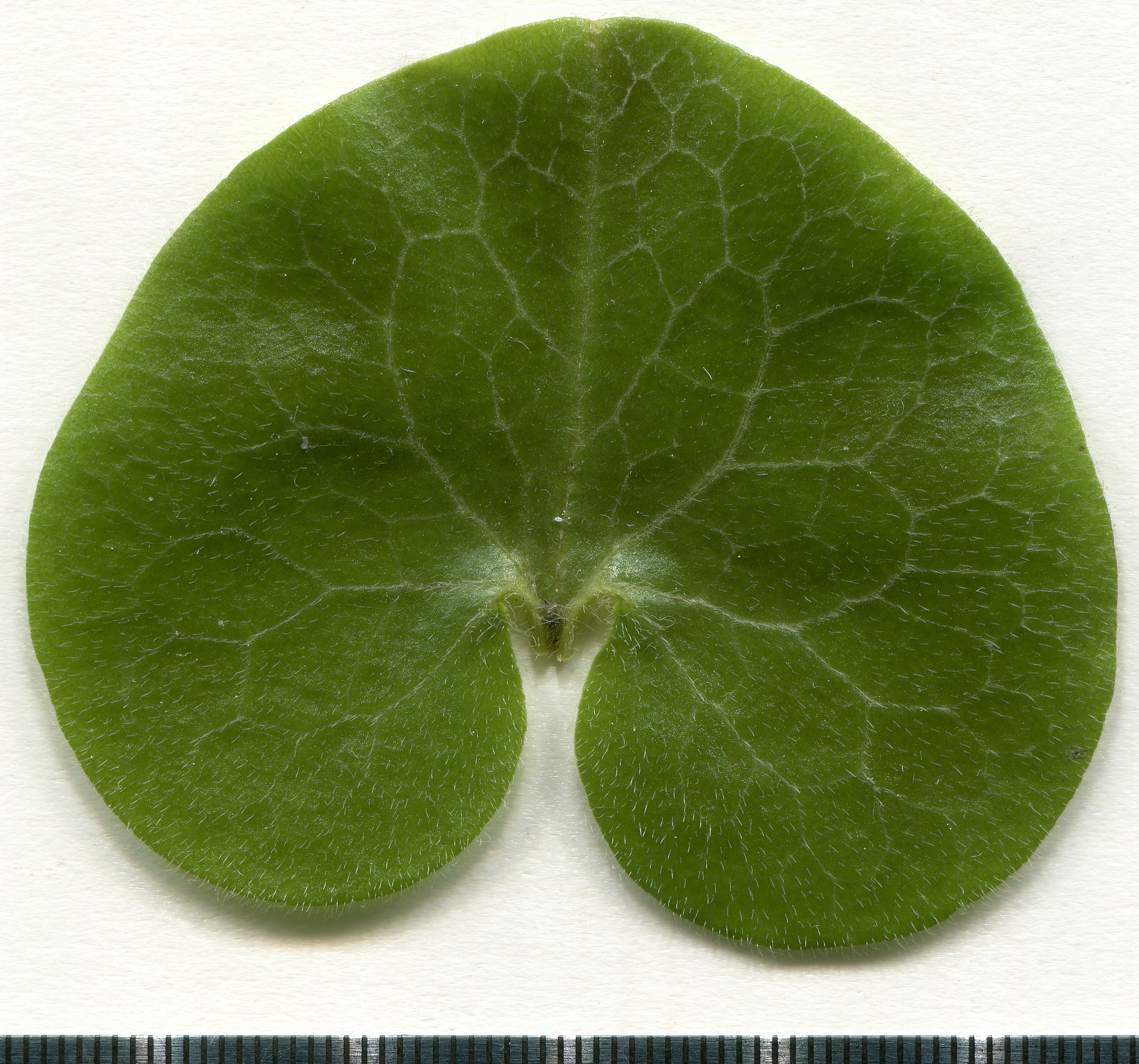
Leaf adaxial side.

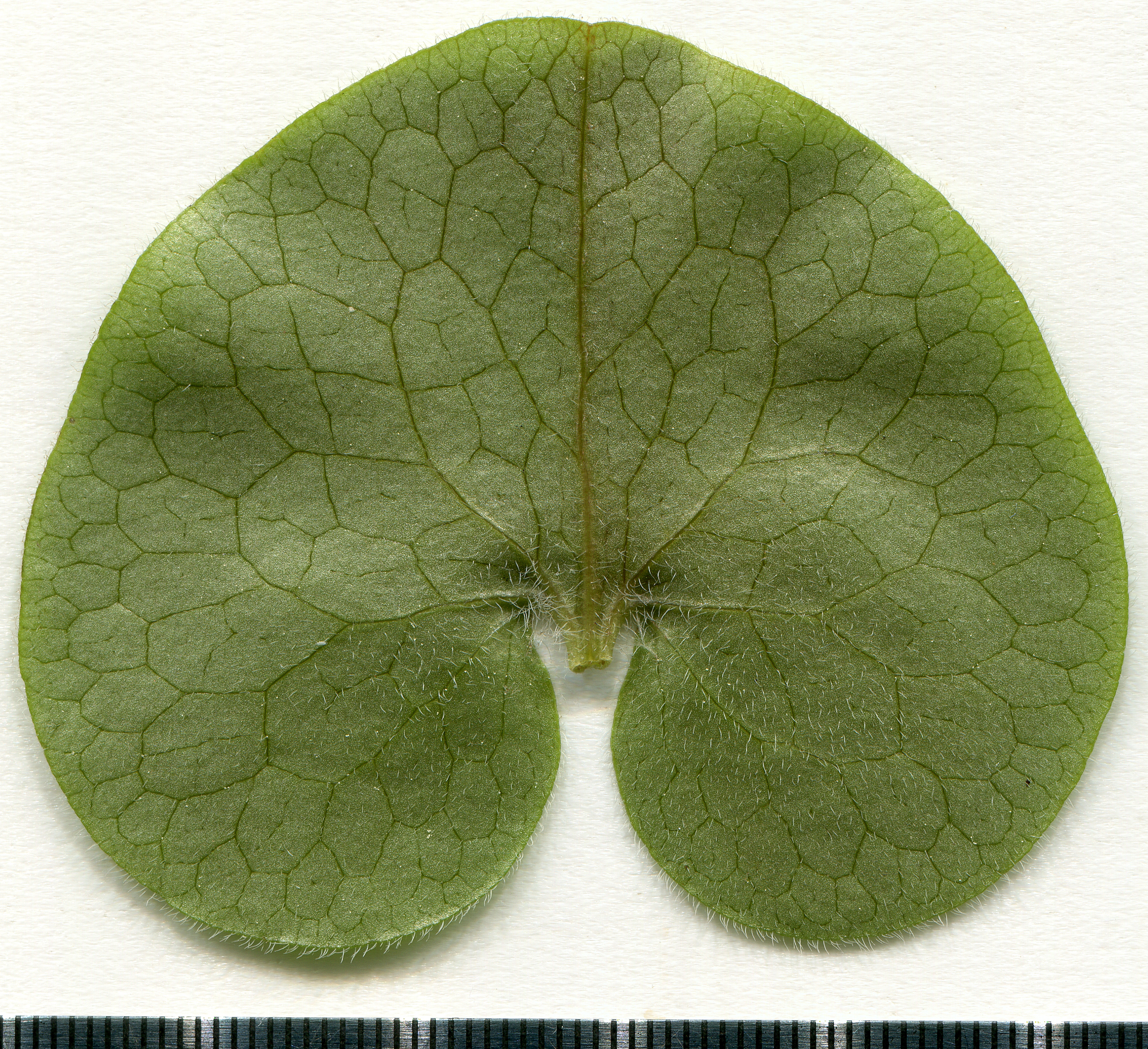
Leaf abaxial side.

== Bibliography ==
=== Chemistry ===
- Saeedi, Mina; Fani, Elham; Manayi, Azadeh; Khanavi, Mahnaz (December 2024). "Phytochemical Analysis of the Ethyl Acetate Fraction of Asarum europaeum L. Rhizomes" (PDF). Research Journal of Pharmacognosy. 12 (1): 31–36. doi:10.22127/rjp.2024.459873.2478.
- Stanković, Miloš; Stanković, Jelena; Mihajilov-Krstev, Tatjana; Mitić, Mihajlo; Živković, Dragan; Nikolić, Nataša; Kostić, Slobodan (30 September 2022). "Antioxidant and Antibacterial Activity of Extracts from Selected Plant Material". Applied Sciences. 12 (19): 9871. doi:10.3390/app12199871.
- Michl, Johanna; Bello, Olusheyi; Kite, Geoffrey C; Simmonds, Monique S J; Heinrich, Michael (22 May 2017). "Medicinally Used Asarum Species: High-Resolution LC-MS Analysis of Aristolochic Acid Analogs and In vitro Toxicity Screening in HK-2 Cells". Front Pharmacol. 8 (215): 215. doi:10.3389/fphar.2017.00215. PMC 5439001. PMID 28588481.
- Nikolić, Nataša; Mihajilov-Krstev, Tatjana; Stanković, Miloš; Kostić, Slobodan (October 2016). "Volatile constituents of Asarum europaeum L. from Serbia". Chemistry & Biodiversity. 13 (10): 1361–1366. doi:10.1002/cbdv.201600020. PMID 27447988.
- van der Heijden, J. W. W.; van den Berg, J. H. M.; van der Hoeven, J. G. M. (21 September 2015). "β-Asarone: A Review of Its Chemistry, Occurrence, and Toxicology". Chemical Research in Toxicology. 28 (9): 1693–1704. doi:10.1021/acs.chemrestox.5b00223. PMID 26273788.
- Wilczewska, Agnieszka Zofia; Ulman, Magdalena; Chilmonczyk, Zdzisław; Maj, Jadwiga; Koprowicz, Tomasz; Tomczyk, Michał; Tomczykowa, Monika (September 2008). "Comparison of Volatile Constituents of Acorus calamus and Asarum europaeum Obtained by Different Techniques". Journal of Essential Oil Research. 20 (5): 390–395. doi:10.1080/10412905.2008.9700038.
- Schaneberg, B. T.; Applequist, W. L.; Khan, I. A. (October 2002). "Determination of aristolochic acid I and II in North American species of Asarum and Aristolochia". Pharmazie. 57 (10): 686–689. PMID 12426949.
- Glowniak, K.; Zgórka, E.; Gralec, M. (1997). "Chemical composition of the essential oil of Asarum europaeum L. from Poland". Journal of Essential Oil Research. 9 (5): 531–534. doi:10.1080/10412905.1997.9700790.
- Gracza, L. (1983). "The Active Substances of Asarum europaeum. 16. The local anesthetic activity of the phenylpropane derivatives". Planta Medica. 48 (7): 153–157. doi:10.1055/s-2007-969912. PMID 17404976.
- Gracza, L. (1979). "Phytochemical investigations of the essential oil isolated from Asarum europaeum L. rhizomes led to the characterization of the tricyclic α–agarofurane". Planta Medica. 37 (3): 208–210. doi:10.1055/s-0028-1097313.
- Gracza, L. (1967). "On the active substances of Asarum europaeum. 8. Flavonoids". Planta Medica. 15 (3): 187–193. doi:10.1055/s-0028-1099912. PMID 5734277.

=== Ecology ===
- Yaroshenko, Nataliia; Skliar, Viktoriia (6 December 2022). "Onthogenetic and Vitality Structure of Asarum Europaeum in Terms of Forest Management in Goettingen Forest, Low Saxony, Germany". 22nd SGEM International Multidisciplinary Scientific GeoConference Proceedings 2022, Water Resources. Forest, Marine and Ocean Ecosystems, VOL 22, ISSUE 3.2. Vol. 22. pp. 397–404. doi:10.5593/sgem2022V/3.2/s14.46. ISBN 978-619-7603-54-5.
- Kovalenko, I. M.; Klymenko, H. O.; Hozhenko, K. H. (30 July 2017). "Population analysis of Asarum europaeum in the Northeast of Ukraine". Biosystems Diversity. 25 (3): 210–215. Bibcode:2017BiDiv..25..210K. doi:10.15421/011732.

=== Ethnobotany ===
- Singh, S. K.; Singh, S. K.; Singh, S. K. (March 2025). "Holistic Approaches to managing female infertility: A comprehensive review". Journal of Drug Delivery and Therapeutics. 15 (3): 180–189. doi:10.22270/jddt.v15i3.7032.
- Zlatković, M. J.; Ranđelović, D. M.; Stojanović, M. M.; Stamenković, S. M. (15 January 2024). "Ethnobotanical research in Southeast Europe: A systematic review". Journal of Ethnopharmacology. 336 (1) 117865. doi:10.1016/j.jep.2024.117865. PMC 10782642. PMID 38200599.
- Akhlaq, S.; Ara, S. A.; Fazil, M.; Ahmad, B.; Akram, U.; Haque, M.; Khan, A. A. (2022). "Ethno pharmacology, phytochemical analysis, safety profile, prophylactic aspects, and therapeutic potential of Asarum europaeum L. in Unani medicine: An evidence-based appraisal". Phytomedicine Plus. 2 (2) 100226. doi:10.1016/j.phyplu.2022.100226.
- Maseehullah, M D; Zakir, Mohammad; Anas, Mohd; Kazmi, Munawwar Husain (12 August 2021). "Ethno-pharmacology of Asaroon (Asarum europaeum L.) with special reference to Unani System of Medicine". J Complement Integr Med. 19 (2): 181–192. doi:10.1515/jcim-2021-0021. PMID 34388332.
- Kujawska, Anna; Łuczaj, Łukasz; Kujawski, Marcin; Kujawski, Jerzy (1 September 2015). "Ethnoveterinary practices in the Polish Carpathians: Traditional plant remedies for animal health". Journal of Ethnopharmacology. 175: 44–58. doi:10.1016/j.jep.2015.09.001. PMID 26384001.

=== Pathology ===
- Jork, H.; Schutt, P. (March 1972). "Einfluss des Nährstoffangebotes auf die Morphologie und auf die Zusammensetzung des Ätherischen Öles von Asarum europaeum". Planta Medica. 21 (3): 265–276. doi:10.1055/s-0028-1099600. PMID 5081815.

=== Pharmacology ===
- Liu, Hanze; Wang, Changhong (10 January 2022). "The genus Asarum: A review on phytochemistry, ethnopharmacology, toxicology and pharmacokinetics". Journal of Ethnopharmacology. 282 114642. doi:10.1016/j.jep.2021.114642. PMID 34537281.
- Reddy, K. S.; Reddy, V. B.; Yao, Z. P. (2020). "Asarone: A review of its phytochemistry, pharmacology, and toxicology". Journal of Ethnopharmacology. 258 112836. doi:10.1016/j.jep.2020.112836. PMID 32344160.
- Saeedi, Mina; Vahedi-Mazdabadi, Yasaman; Rastegari, Arezoo; Soleimani, Mahdieh; Eftekhari, Mahdieh; Akbarzadeh, Tahmineh; Khanavi, Mahnaz (2 June 2020). "Evaluation of Asarum europaeum L. Rhizome for the Biological Activities Related to Alzheimer's Disease" (PDF). Research Journal of Pharmacognosy. 7 (3): 25–33. doi:10.22127/rjp.2020.223143.1565.

=== Taxonomy ===
- Kelly, Lawrence M. (2001). "Taxonomy of Asarum Section Asarum (Aristolochiaceae)". Systematic Botany. 26 (1): 17–53. doi:10.1043/0363-6445-26.1.17 (inactive 1 July 2025).

=== Toxicology ===
- Han, Jiayin; Xian, Zhong; Zhang, Yushi; Liu, Jing; Liang, Aihua (11 June 2019). "Systematic Overview of Aristolochic Acids: Nephrotoxicity, Carcinogenicity, and Underlying Mechanisms". Frontiers in Pharmacology. 10 648. doi:10.3389/fphar.2019.00648. PMC 6580798. PMID 31244661.
- Cartus, Alexander T.; Stegmüller, Simone; Simson, Nadine; Wahl, Andrea; Neef, Sylvia; Kelm, Harald; Schrenk, Dieter (14 August 2015). "Hepatic Metabolism of Carcinogenic β-Asarone". Chemical Research in Toxicology. 28 (9): 1760–1773. doi:10.1021/acs.chemrestox.5b00223. PMID 26273788.
- Jaspersen-Schib, R.; Theus, L.; Guirguis-Oeschger, M.; Meier, Peter J. (July 1996). "Serious plant poisonings in Switzerland 1966-1994. Case analysis from the Swiss Toxicology Information Center". Schweizerische Medizinische Wochenschrift. 126 (29): 1277–1284.
- Hasheminejad, G.; Caldwell, John (April 1994). "Genotoxicity of the alkenylbenzenes alpha- and beta-asarone, myristicin and elimicin as determined by the UDS assay in cultured rat hepatocytes". Food and Chemical Toxicology. 32 (4): 321–330. doi:10.1016/0278-6915(94)90003-8 (inactive 1 July 2025).
- Brändle, W.; Gurtner, B.; Wegmann, T. (August 1969). "Hemiparesis in an abortion attempt with hazelwort tea decoction (Asarum europaeum)". Schweizerische Medizinische Wochenschrift. 99 (32): 1161–1163.
