= Asarum lemmonii =

Conservation status
- Apparently Secure (NatureServe)

Scientific classification
- Kingdom: Plantae
- Clade: Tracheophytes
- Clade: Angiosperms
- Clade: Magnoliids
- Order: Piperales
- Family: Aristolochiaceae
- Genus: Asarum
- Species: A. lemmonii

Binomial name
- Asarum lemmonii S. Wats.

Species of flowering plant

Asarum lemmonii is a species of wild ginger which is endemic to California. It is known by the common name Lemmon's wild ginger.

It is a spreading plant which forms dense green mats on the ground. The leaves are rich green and heart-shaped. It bears a small cup-shaped flower which is red externally and white inside. The plant grows in moist areas in the High Sierra.
