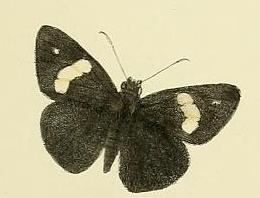

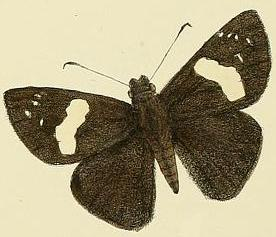

Scientific classification
- Domain: Eukaryota
- Kingdom: Animalia
- Phylum: Arthropoda
- Class: Insecta
- Order: Lepidoptera
- Family: Hesperiidae
- Genus: Notocrypta
- Species: N. feisthamelii

Binomial name
- Notocrypta feisthamelii (Boisduval, 1832)

= Notocrypta feisthamelii =

Spotted demon

Species of butterfly

Notocrypta feisthamelii, the spotted demon, is an Indomalayan butterfly belonging to the family Hesperiidae. The name honours the French entomologist Joachim François Philibert Feisthamel.

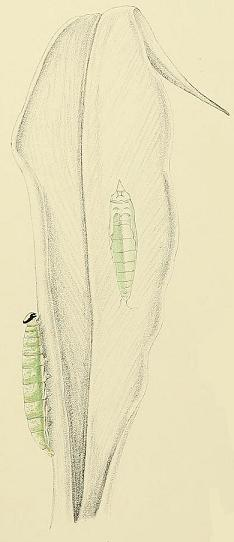
Larvae

The named subspecies are

- N. f. rectifasciata Leech West China
- N. f. alysos (Moore, [1866]) Himalaya to Burma, Thailand, Vietnam, Laos, Langkawi, Malaysia, Yunnan
- N. f. celebensis (Staudinger, 1889) Celebes
- N. f. avattana Fruhstorfer, 1911 Java
- N. f. samyutta Fruhstorfer, 1911 Lombok
- N. f. alinkara Fruhstorfer, 1911 Philippines (Mindanao)
- N. f. padhana Fruhstorfer, 1911 Batjan

The larva feeds on Costus, Maranta, Musa, Amomum, Curcuma, Elettaria, Hedychium, Zingiber.
