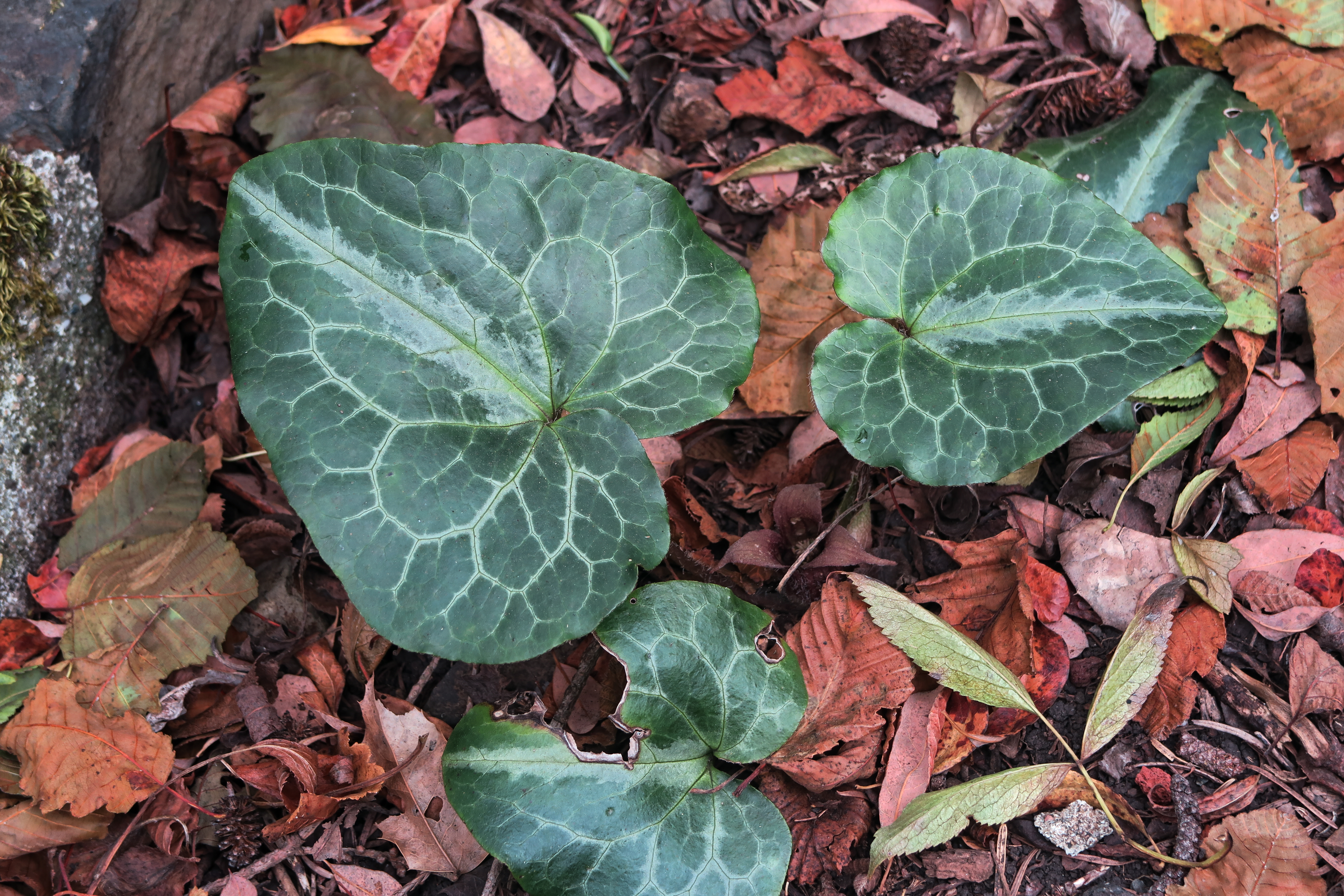

Conservation status
- Secure (NatureServe)

Scientific classification
- Kingdom: Plantae
- Clade: Tracheophytes
- Clade: Angiosperms
- Clade: Magnoliids
- Order: Piperales
- Family: Aristolochiaceae
- Genus: Asarum
- Species: A. hartwegii

Binomial name
- Asarum hartwegii S.Wats.

= Asarum hartwegii =

Hartweg's wild ginger

Species of flowering plant

Asarum hartwegii is a species of wild ginger known by the common name Hartweg's wild ginger.

== Distribution ==
It is endemic to California, and grows in forest habitat. This is a perennial herb growing from a ginger-scented rhizome which extends vertically deep into the ground. It forms a clump of elaborately white-veined leaves which are heart-shaped to round in shape and coated in curved hairs. Each is borne on a long petiole up to 21 centimeters (8.3 in) long. It bears a solitary flower near the ground on a short peduncle. The flower has no petals but three curving, hairy, brownish or maroon sepals which are whitish with red stripes on their inner surfaces. The fruit is a fleshy capsule containing many seeds.
