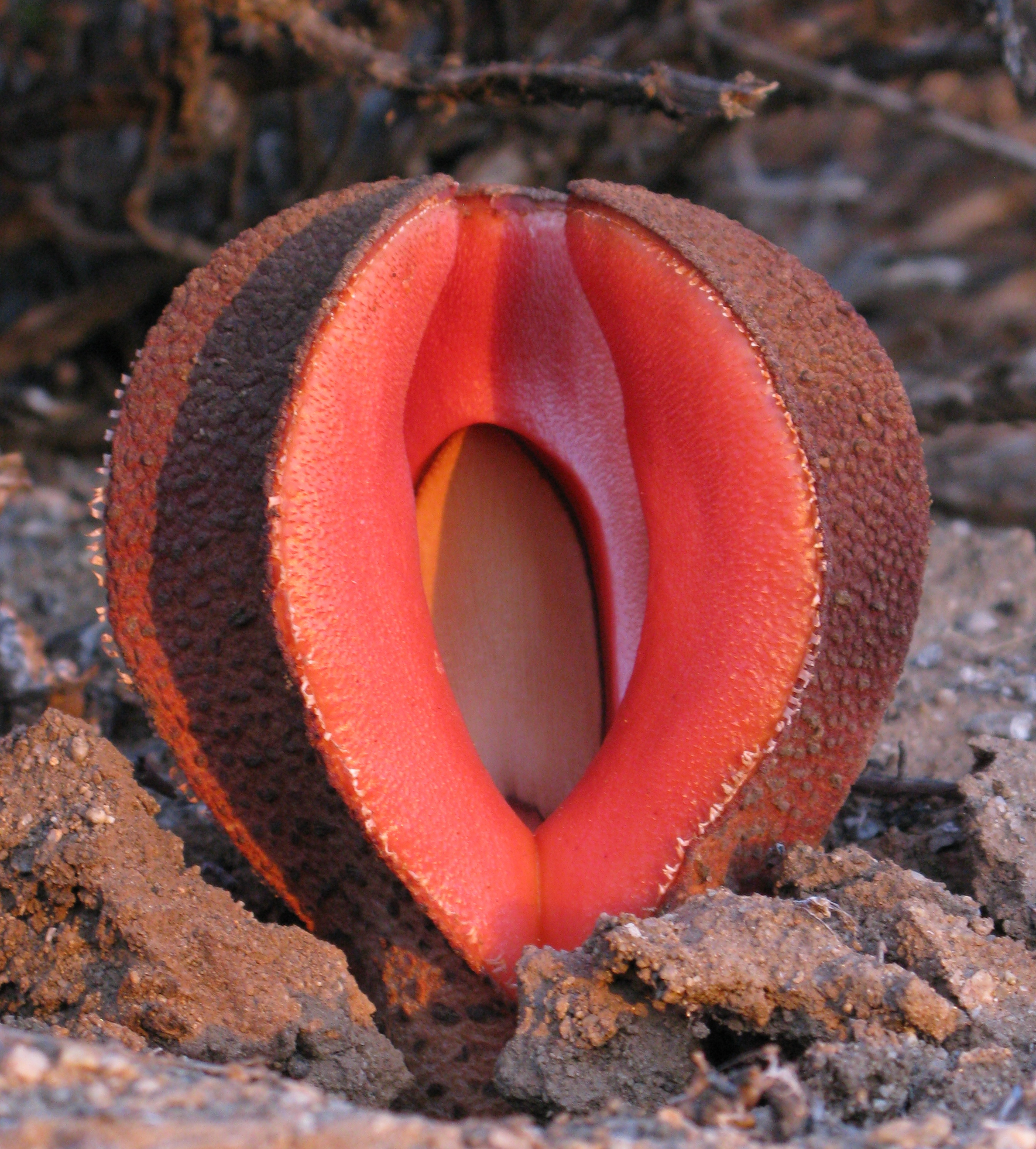
- Flower of Hydnora visseri.

Conservation status
- Least Concern (IUCN 3.1)

Scientific classification
- Kingdom: Plantae
- Clade: Tracheophytes
- Clade: Angiosperms
- Clade: Magnoliids
- Order: Piperales
- Family: Aristolochiaceae
- Subfamily: Hydnoroideae
- Genus: Hydnora
- Species: H. visseri

Binomial name
- Hydnora visseri Bolin, E.Maass, & Musselman

= Hydnora visseri =

Species of parasitic flowering plant

Hydnora visseri, the Visser's hydnora, is a subterranean holoparasitic plant, lacking leaves and roots, and is described from southwestern Namibia and northwestern South Africa and has the longest tepal lobes of all Hydnora species. The genus Hydnora is composed entirely of holoparasitic plants that attach to the root of their hosts and are restricted to Africa and southwestern Asia.

== Description ==
Hydnora visseri, as a holoparasitic plant, lacks chlorophyll and depends entirely on its hosts, Euphorbia gregaria or E. gummifera, for all water and nutrition. H. visseri lacks leaves and roots. The vegetative body of the plant is a brown warty rhizome that spreads laterally through the soil. The bumps on the rhizome of Hydnora spp. can differentiate into haustoria (specialized organs for parasitizing the host plant), flower buds, or bifurcations of the rhizome. The rhizomes when broken are reddish to pink and contain high levels of tannins.

The only portion of the plant that emerges from the soil surface is the large fleshy flower. The pollination of Visser's hydnora involves a trap and release mechanism where dermestid beetles are detained for several days, then released dusted with pollen. The fruit is a large berry with thousands of small (< 1mm diameter) seeds, and is usually buried or just at the soil surface.

== Taxonomy ==
In South African and Namibia where Hydnora visseri may be encountered, four other Hydnora species exist, H. abyssincia, H. africana, H. longicollis and H. triceps. H. visseri can be discriminated from those taxa by its exclusive hosts Euphorbia gummifera and E. gregaria, and by having the longest tepals of any Hydnora spp. in Southern Africa, 5.5–9 cm long.

The family Hydnoraceae has been submerged within the Aristolochiaceae in the Piperales, based on a modern phylogenetic study that also found that the plastome of H. visseri is highly reduced, relative to photosynthetic plants, with only 27K base pairs.

=== Etymology ===
- Genus name (generic epithet): Hydnora derives from the Ancient Greek ὕδνον, 'truffle', because of the somatic structure of this root parasite.
- Species name (specific epithet): H. visseri is named after Stellenbosch University professor Johann H. Visser (1931-1990) and author of the text South African Parasitic Flowering Plants.

== Distribution and habitat ==
Hydnora visseri grows in the winter rainfall and transitional rainfall areas of the Karas Region of Namibia and the Northern Cape province of South Africa. It occurs in a limited distribution centred around the Orange River, and is only present where its hosts Euphorbia gummifera and E. gregaria are present. H. visseri does not occur in the Karoo, nor a Karoo-type habitat, but is present in a region which the WWF has called the Succulent-Karoo and/or Nama-Karoo biomes. Hydnora visseri is most easily located by searching in around the base of the host Euphorbia plants.

== Genomics ==
The highly reduced plastid genome map of Hydnora visseri.

Hydnora visseri possesses one of the smallest plastid genomes among flowering plants. As compared to the chloroplast genome of its closest photosynthetic relatives, the plastome of Hydnora visseri shows extreme reduction in both size (27,233 bp) and gene content (24 genes appear to be functional).

== Conservation ==
Based on the Red List of South African Plants, H. visseri is considered a taxon of 'least concern' due to its widespread distribution in regions with large protected areas, such as the ǀAi-ǀAis/Richtersveld Transfrontier Park and Tsau ǁKhaeb National Park.
