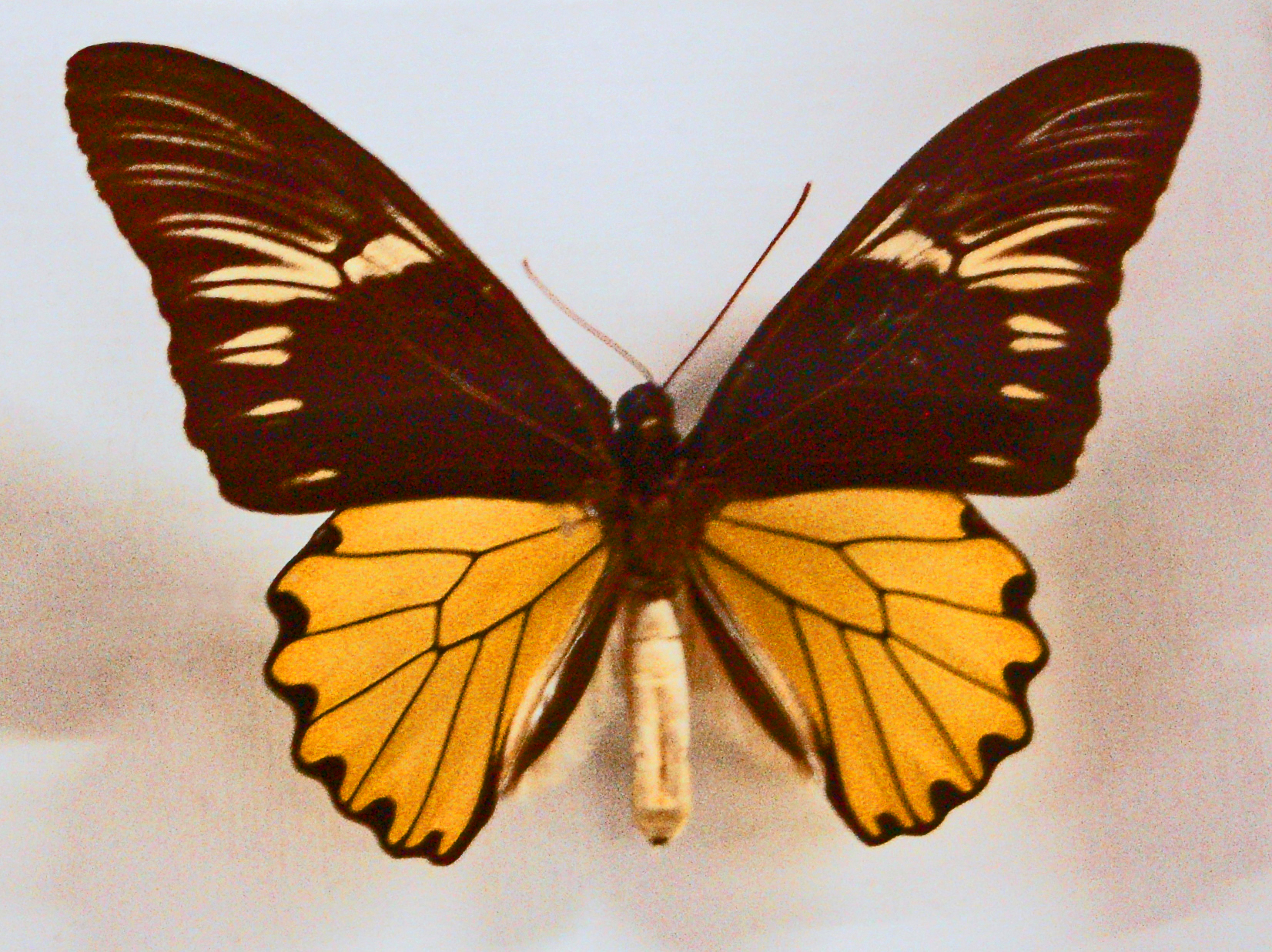
- Male, upperside
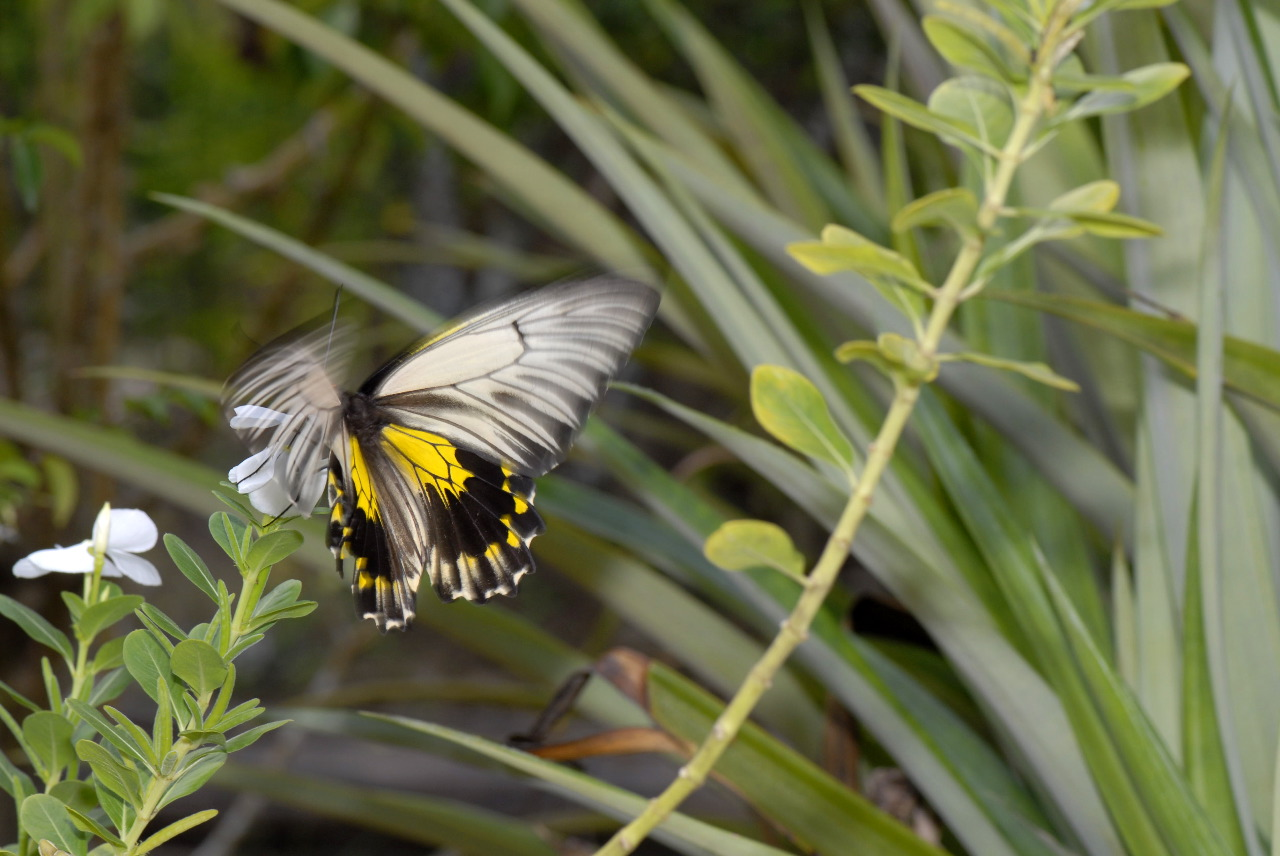
- Female

Conservation status
- Least Concern (IUCN 3.1)
- CITES Appendix II

Scientific classification
- Kingdom: Animalia
- Phylum: Arthropoda
- Clade: Pancrustacea
- Class: Insecta
- Order: Lepidoptera
- Family: Papilionidae
- Genus: Troides
- Species: T. amphrysus

Binomial name
- Troides amphrysus (Cramer, 1779)

Synonyms
- Papilio amphrysus Cramer, [1779]; Ornithoptera euthydemus Fruhstorfer, 1913; Ornithoptera olympia Honrath, 1891

= Troides amphrysus =

Malay birdwing

Species of butterfly

Troides amphrysus, the Malay birdwing, is a birdwing butterfly in the genus Troides in the family Papilionidae.

== Taxonomy ==
=== Subspecies ===
Many subspecies have been proposed:

- T. a. actinotia Jordan, 1909 Indonesia (South Borneo)
- T. a. amphrysus (Cramer, 1779) Indonesia (Java, Bali)
- T. a. arkumene Hayami, 1994 Malaysia (Tioman Island)
- T. a. astrea Hayami, 1992 Indonesia (Banyak Island)
- T. a. chrysomelas Parrott & Schmid, 1984 Indonesia (Natuna Regency)
- T. a. euthydemus (Fruhstorfer, 1913 Indonesia (Sumatra)
- T. a. flavicollis (Druce, 1873) Malaysia (North Borneo)
- T. a. hilbert Hayami, 1992 Indonesia[n] Borneo: Karimata Islands
- T. a. kecilensis (Schäffler, 1999) Indonesia (South Borneo: Laut Kecil Islands)
- T. a. kuris Kobayashi & Hayami, 1987 Indonesia (Anambas Islands Regency)
- T. a. merah Kobayashi & Hayami, 1992 Indonesia (Simuk, Batu Islands)
- T. a. naokoae (Morita, 1996) Malaysia (Langkawi)
- T. a. niasicus (Fruhstorfer, 1898) Indonesia (Nias)
- T. a. perintis Kobayashi, 1986 Indonesia (Tambelan Islands)
- T. a. ruficollis (Butler, 1879 Malaysia (Peninsular Malaya, Thailand, Myanmar)
- T. a. simeuluensis Ohya, 1985 Indonesia (Simeuluë, Babi Island)
- T. a. vistara Fruhstorfer, 1906 Indonesia (Batu Island)
- T. a. zeus Kobayashi & Hayami, 1992 Indonesia (Sipora, Siberut, Mentawai)

=== Closely allied species ===
Several species together may form a wider "Troides amphrysus-species group"; these include:

- Troides amphrysus (Cramer, [1779])
- Troides andromache (Staudinger, 1892)
- Troides cuneifera (Oberthür, 1879)
- Troides miranda (Butler, 1869)

== Description ==
Male. The uppersides of the forewings are black or dark brown, with veins bordered by pale yellow. The uppersides of the hindwings are golden yellow, with black veins and black spots at the edges.

Female. The basic colour of the females is black or dark brown, with veins bordered by white. The uppersides of the hindwings have a smaller golden-yellow area at the base and several yellow spots at the edges.

In both sexes the undersides are similar to the uppersides. The abdomen is yellow, while the head and thorax are black.

== Life history ==
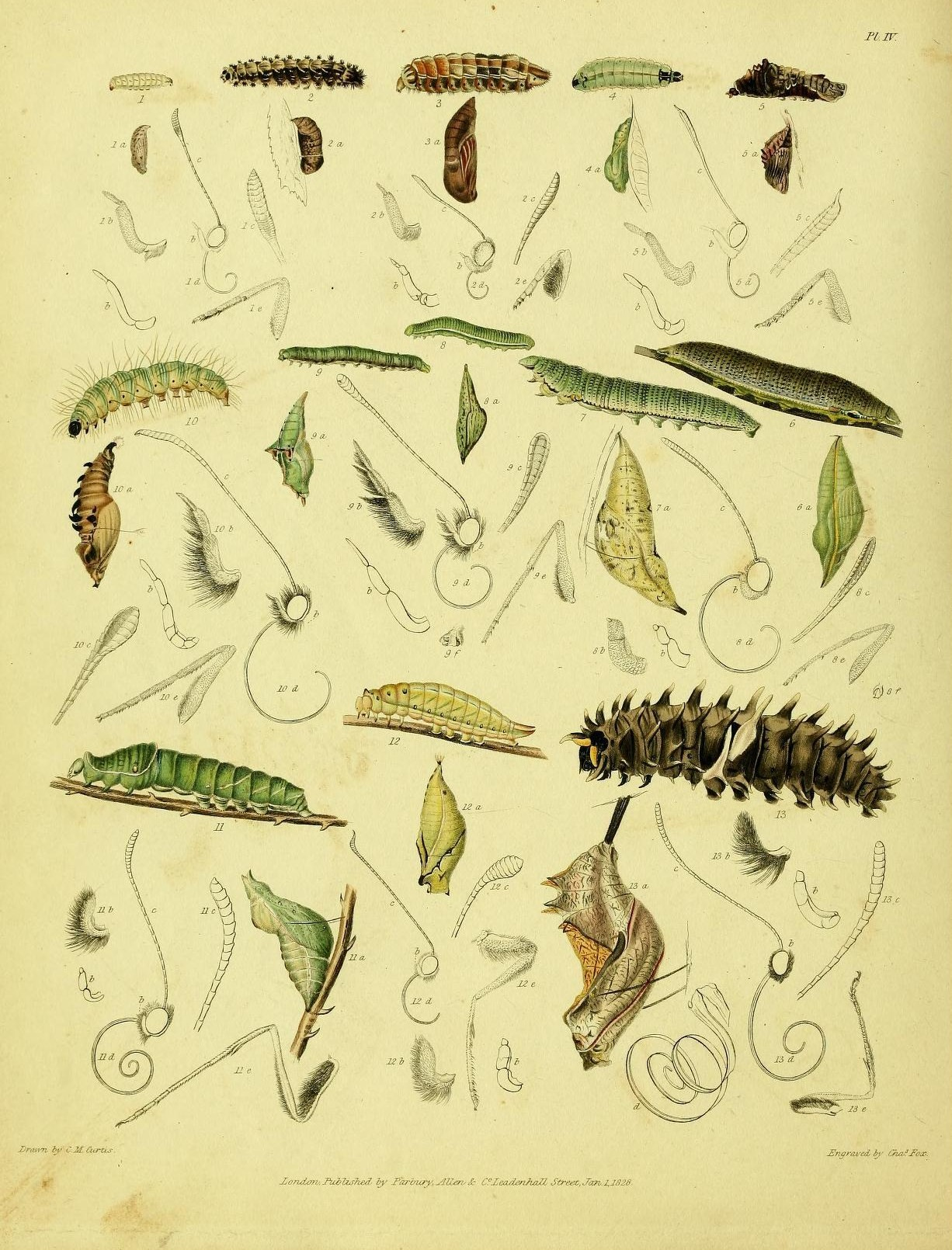
Figure 13 (bottom right)

The egg is large, round and a pearly colour. Eggs are deposited on the food plant and the incubation period is two weeks.

The first instar larva is black and bears numerous orange tubercles with short, black, branched spines. The intermediate instars 2, 3 and 4 are black. The thoracic segments have eight tubercles and the abdominal segments have six each. These are fleshy and lack spines. The dorsal tubercles of the 2nd, 3rd, 6th, and the 7th abdominal segments are black. All the other tubercles are bright orange. In the penultimate and final instars the head is black and the thorax and abdomen are dark coffee brown. There is no saddle mark in this species. The tubercles are largely uniform in size, shape and of the ground colour. They are inclined posteriorly and the apices are bent forwards to form small hooks. This species is not monophagous. The larvae feed on Aristolochia - A. acuminata and A. foveolata and on various Thottea species.

The pupa is yellowish green and is marked with greyish veins as in a leaf. It has a broad dorsal saddle mark, this is lemon yellow transversely marked with brown streaks. The abdomen has three pairs of sharp dorsal processes, directed laterally. The pupal stage lasts from 27 to 30 days.

== Distribution and habitat ==
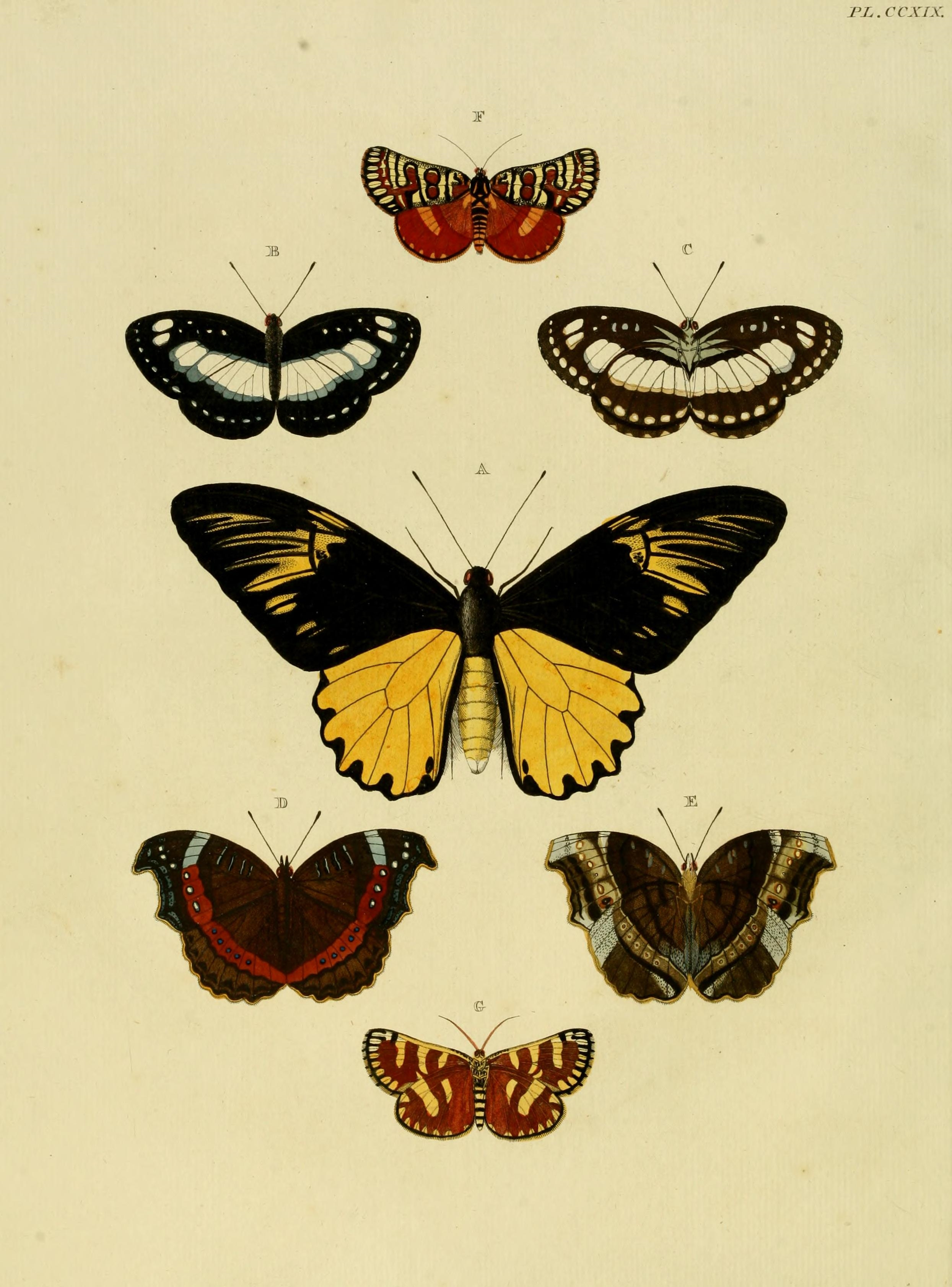
Figure A (centre), accompanying the original description in Cramer and Stoll Uitlandsche Kapellen

This species can be found in the Australasian realm and in the Indomalayan realm, from Myanmar to Indonesia. The habitat is primary and secondary rainforest.

== Behaviour ==
In the morning, the butterflies fly at 20 to 30 m high in the canopy. Females rest on the foliage, while males glide in broad circles above them. The males perform an elaborate quivering courtship display several metres above the females, before copulation. Later in the day both sexes descend to feed on flowering trees and bushes including Lantana.
