= Thottea praetermissa =

Scientific classification
- Kingdom: Plantae
- Clade: Tracheophytes
- Clade: Angiosperms
- Clade: Magnoliids
- Order: Piperales
- Family: Aristolochiaceae
- Genus: Thottea
- Species: T. praetermissa

Binomial name
- Thottea praetermissa T.L.Yao

Species of shrub

Thottea praetermissa is a small shrub to about 1.2 metres in height, in the family Aristolochiaceae. It is endemic to Singapore. It was assumed to be the same as Thottea dependens until 2014, when it was examined more closely. It has maroon-coloured flower buds which open into 2.5 cm wide flowers with a yellow centre.
