= Patagonian fox =

Patagonian fox may refer to:

- Culpeo
- South American gray fox
