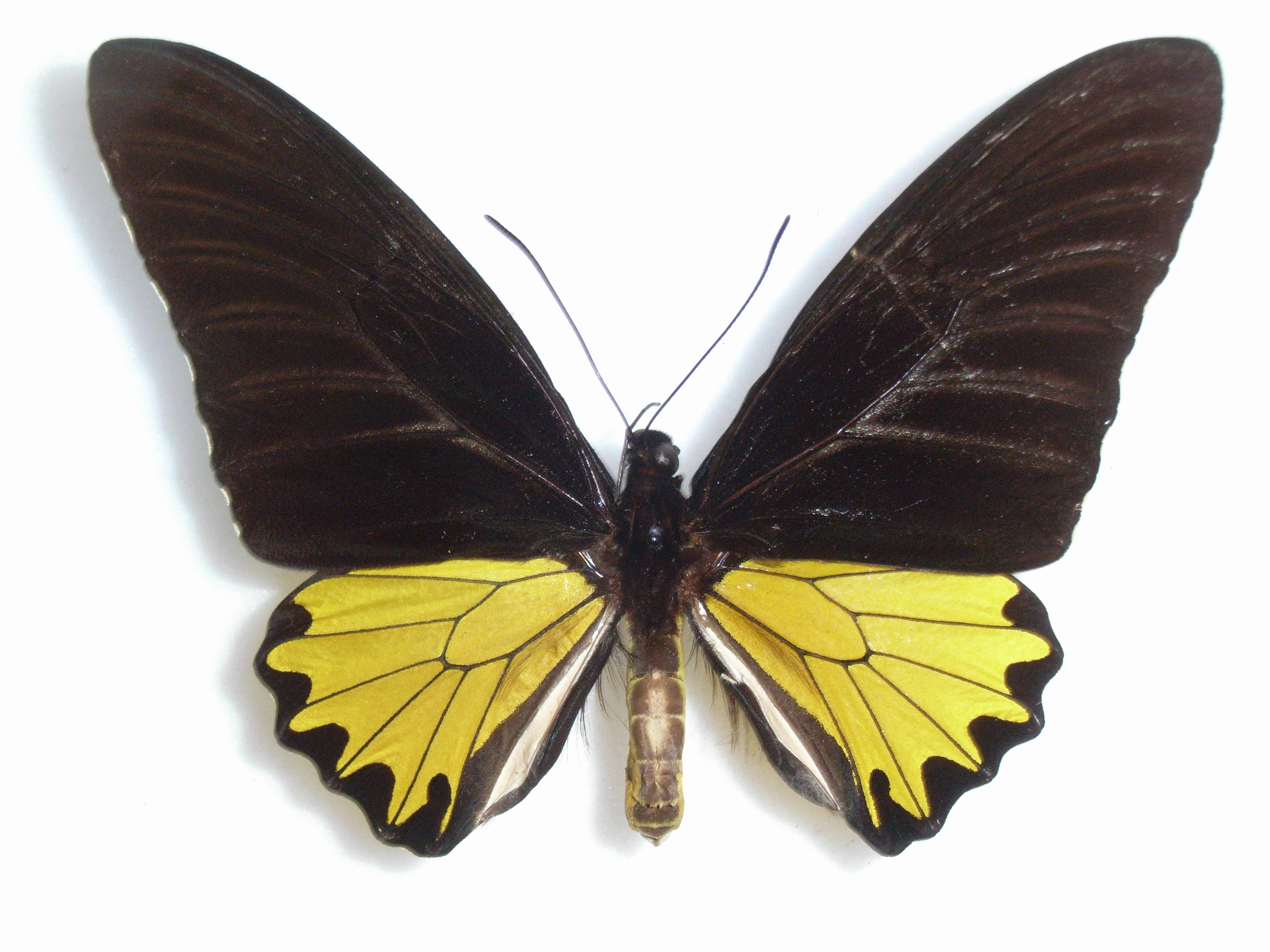

Conservation status
- Vulnerable (IUCN 3.1)
- CITES Appendix II

Scientific classification
- Kingdom: Animalia
- Phylum: Arthropoda
- Clade: Pancrustacea
- Class: Insecta
- Order: Lepidoptera
- Family: Papilionidae
- Genus: Troides
- Species: T. andromache

Binomial name
- Troides andromache (Staudinger, 1892)

= Troides andromache =

Borneo birdwing

Species of butterfly

Troides andromache, the Borneo birdwing or Kinabalu Birdwing, is a species of butterfly in the family Papilionidae. It is found only in Borneo. In 2023, it was selected as the official state butterfly of the state of Sabah, Malaysian Borneo.

== Description ==
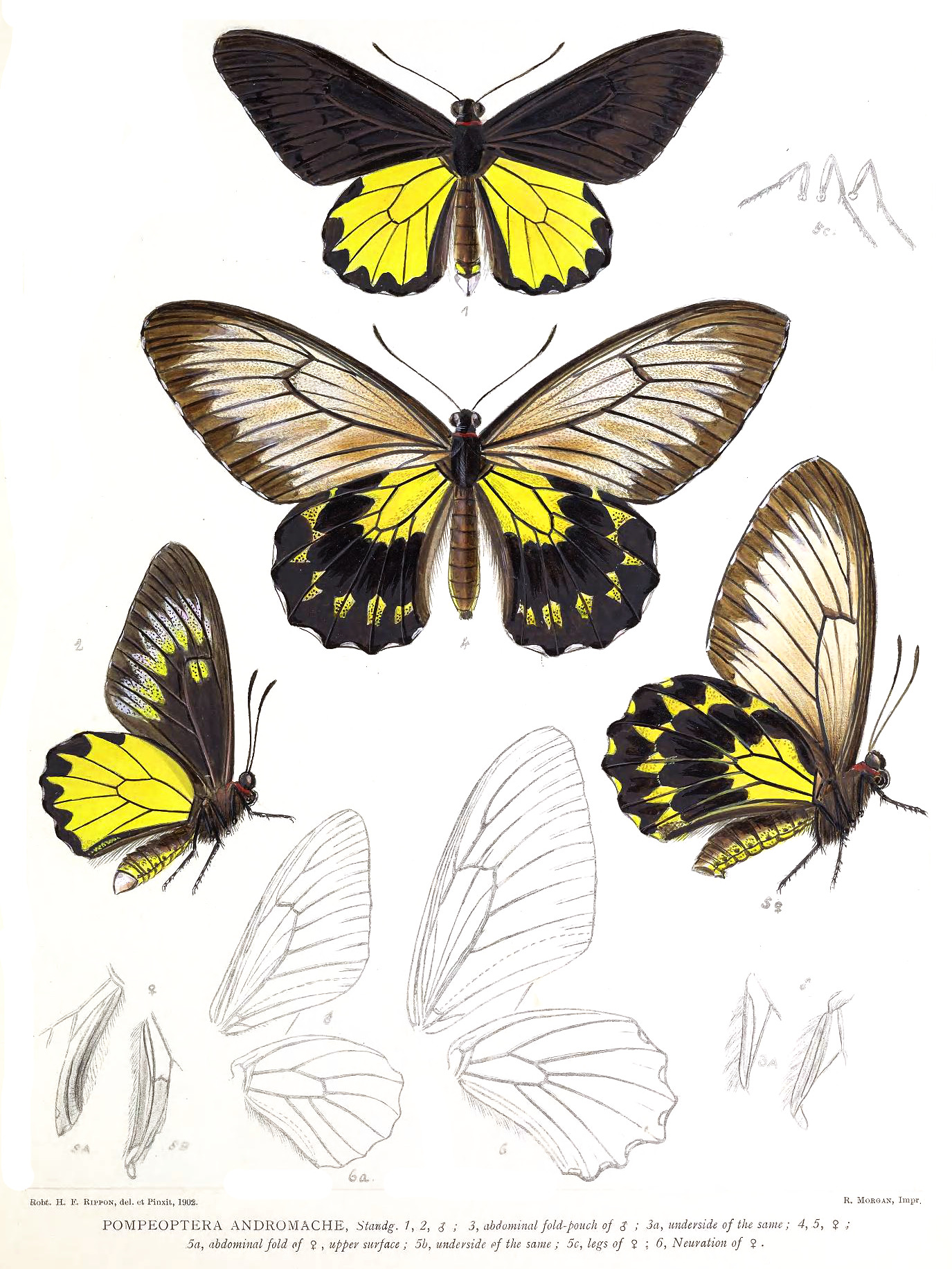
As Pompeoptera andromache in Robert Henry Fernando Rippon's Icones Ornithopterorum (1898 to 1906)

The wingspan ranges from 150 to 180 mm (female), the hindwings are discreetly scalloped. The body is black with yellow marks on the ventral abdomen. Troides andromache is sexually dimorphic.

The males have black upperside forewings. The underside of the forewings is black marked, in the postdiscal area and between the veins, with white. The hindwings are yellow with black veins and have a border of marginal black triangles.

The females have white forewings with black veins lined with grey. The black veined yellow hindwings have wide-bordered black margin and a wide submarginal formed of confluent black spots.

== Subspecies ==
The subspecies are

- Troides andromache andromache northern Borneo, Sabah
- Troides andromache marapokensis Fruhstorfer, 1899 northern Borneo, northern Sarawak
- Troides andromache nishikawai Kobayashi, 1992 western Borneo

== Biology ==
The host plants for the caterpillar are Aristolochia - A. acuminata and A. foveolata.

== Biotope ==
Troides andromache is found in rain forest canopy in the mountains of Borneo at an elevation of 1,000 to 2,900 m.

== Etymology ==
In Greek mythology, Andromache (/ænˈdrɒməkiː/; ancient Greek: Ἀνδρομάχη) was the wife of Hector and daughter of Eetion.

== Related species ==
Troides andromache is a member of the Troides amphrysus species group. The members of this clade are:

- Troides amphrysus (Cramer, [1779])
- Troides andromache (Staudinger, 1892)
- Troides cuneifera (Oberthür, 1879)
- Troides miranda (Butler, 1869)

== See also ==
- Sundaland
