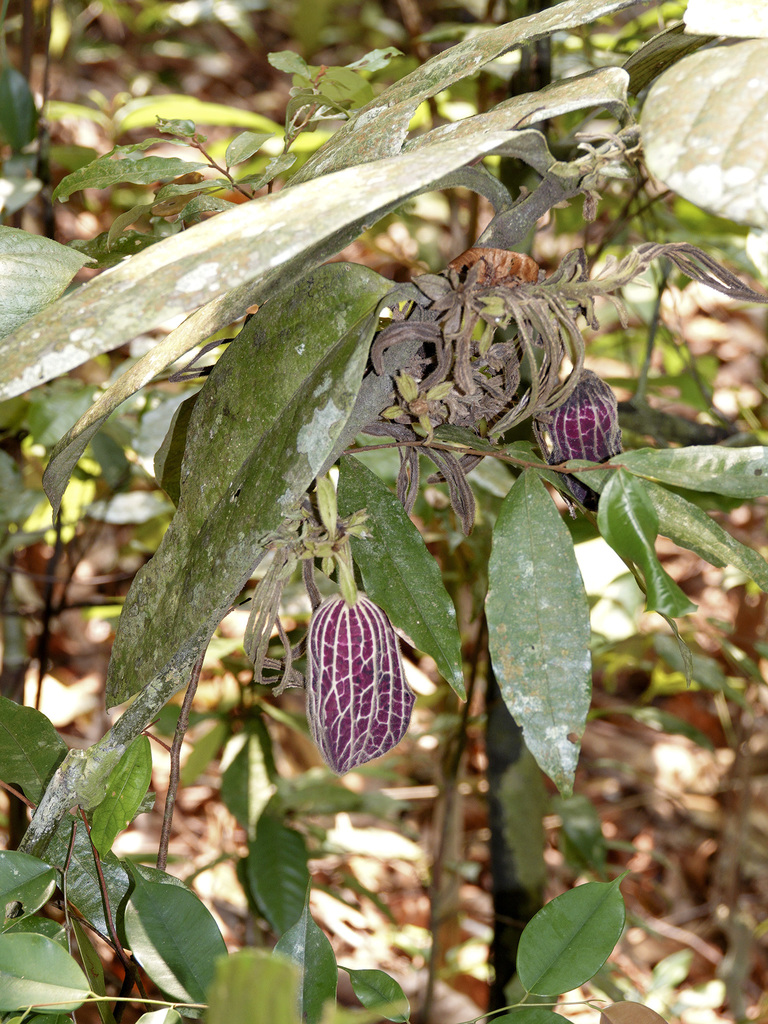

Scientific classification
- Kingdom: Plantae
- Clade: Tracheophytes
- Clade: Angiosperms
- Clade: Magnoliids
- Order: Piperales
- Family: Aristolochiaceae
- Genus: Thottea
- Species: T. grandiflora

Binomial name
- Thottea grandiflora Rottb.

= Thottea grandiflora =

Species of plant

Thottea grandiflora is a small shrub to about 1.2 metres in height which is native to Burma, Thailand, Indo-China, Peninsular Malaysia and Singapore. It belongs to the family Aristolochiaceae. It has pendulous 8 to 10 cm long, somewhat bulbous flowers which are boldly marked with white and green markings.
