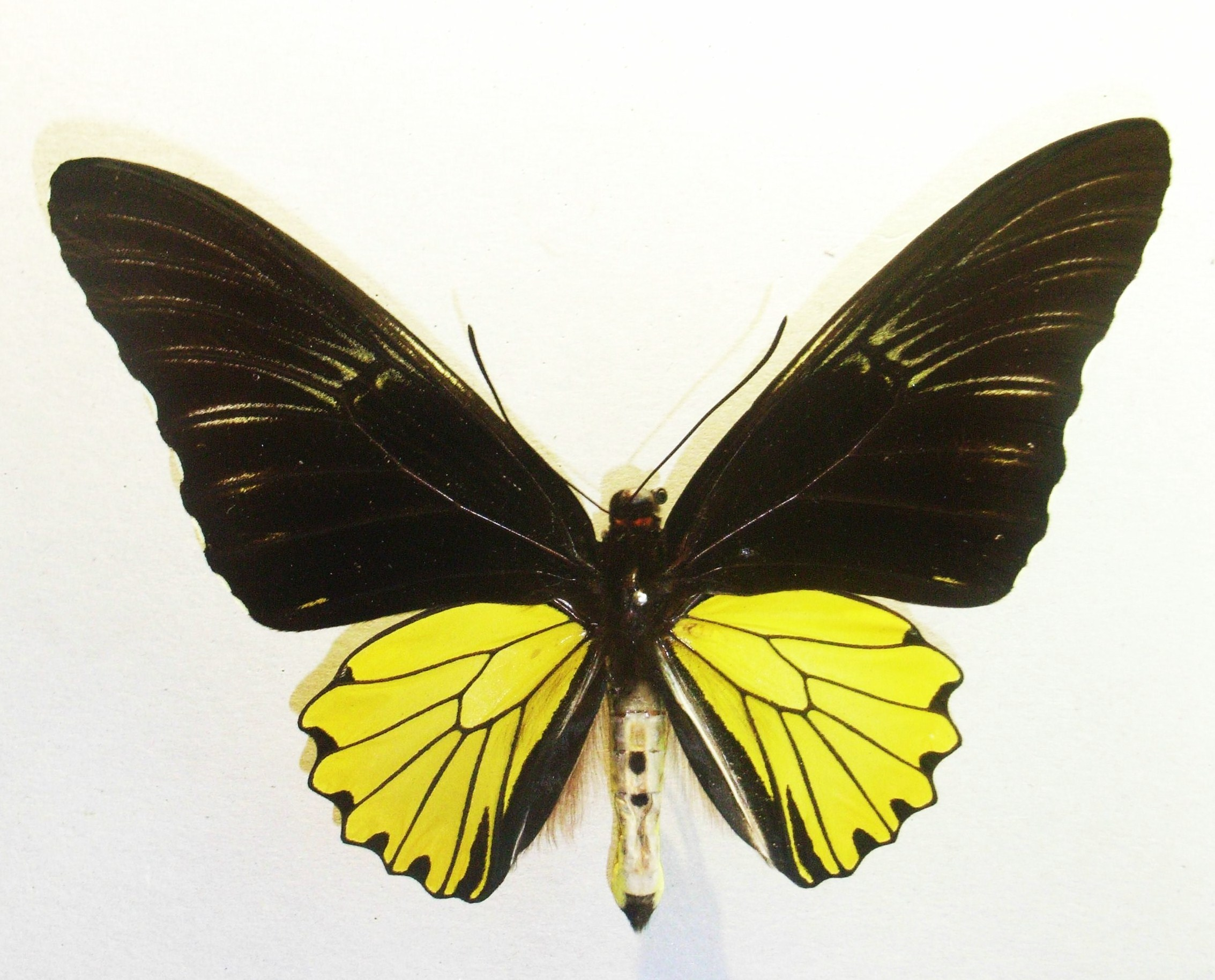
- Male

Conservation status
- CITES Appendix II

Scientific classification
- Kingdom: Animalia
- Phylum: Arthropoda
- Clade: Pancrustacea
- Class: Insecta
- Order: Lepidoptera
- Family: Papilionidae
- Genus: Troides
- Species: T. cuneifera

Binomial name
- Troides cuneifera Oberthür, 1879

= Troides cuneifera =

Species of butterfly

Troides cuneifera, the Mountain Birdwing, is a large butterfly belonging to the swallowtail family, Papilionidae, found in the Thai-Malay Peninsula, Sumatra, Java and Borneo.

Being very similar to Troides amphrysus, the butterfly was originally described as Ornithoptera amphrisius var. cuneifera. The first to separate the two species was Pieter Cornelius Tobias Snellen in 1889. In Sumatra and Java it is a highlands species occurring up to an altitude of 2,000 metres (6,600 ft), but it occurs as low as 300 metres (980 ft) in the Thai-Malay Peninsula. The species is in decline in Sumatra and Java due to human activities such as increased cultivation.

Troides cuneifera tantalus remains one of the great mysteries of the birdwings. The taxon is known from only one male and one female. When described, the specimens were claimed to originate from Kala Bula Hills or Kala Bala Hills, north Borneo.

== Description ==
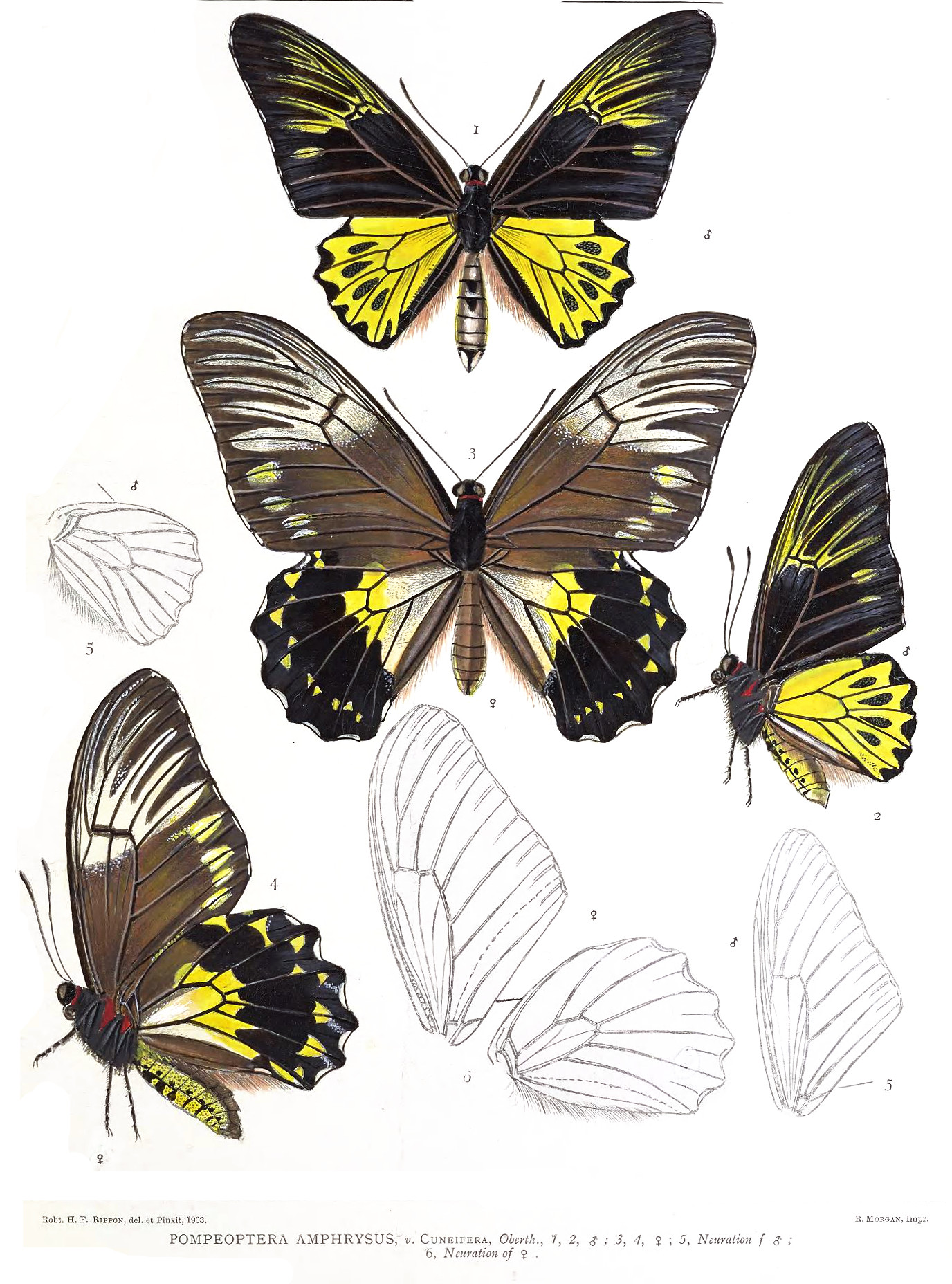

Troides cuneifera is sexually dimorphic.

Male: The forewings are ground colour black. There are some yellow postdiscal stripes which may be faint. The underside of the forewings is very similar. The hindwings are golden yellow. The veins and the edge of the wing are black. There is a chain of post discal black spots. The underside of the hindwings is very similar.

The abdomen is light brown and has two black spots. The underside of the abdomen is yellow. The head and thorax are black.

Female: The female is larger than the male. The wing ground colour is dark brown. The veins are bordered by white shading. There is a golden-yellow area with dark veins on the hindwings. At the outer edge there is a marginal chain of yellow spots. The underside is very similar.

== Biology ==
The larval food plant is a species of Aristolochia, A. foveolata.

== Subspecies ==
- Troides cuneifera cuneifera Java.
- Troides cuneifera paeninsulae (Pendlebury, 1936) Malaysia
- Troides cuneifera sumatranus (Hagen, 1894) Sumatra
- Troides cuneifera tantalus Ehrmann, 1904 North Borneo, known from only one male and one female

== Biogeographic realm ==
Indomalayan realm.

== Related species ==
Troides cuneifera is a member of the Troides amphrysus species group. The members of this clade are:

- Troides amphrysus (Cramer, [1779])
- Troides andromache (Staudinger, 1892)
- Troides cuneifera (Oberthür, 1879)
- Troides miranda (Butler, 1869)
