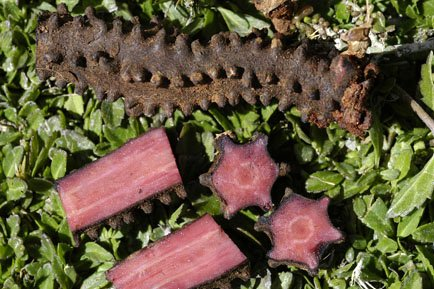
- Hydnora triceps, roots

Scientific classification
- Kingdom: Plantae
- Clade: Embryophytes
- Clade: Tracheophytes
- Clade: Spermatophytes
- Clade: Angiosperms
- Clade: Magnoliids
- Order: Piperales
- Family: Aristolochiaceae
- Subfamily: Hydnoroideae
- Genus: Hydnora
- Species: H. triceps

Binomial name
- Hydnora triceps Drège & E.Mey.

Synonyms
- Aphyteia triceps Steud.

= Hydnora triceps =

Species of parasitic flowering plant

Hydnora triceps is a specie of holoparasitic flowering plant in the family Aristolochiaceae. It is native to Africa and grows on the roots of Euphorbia dregeana. Completely lacking in chlorophyll, it depends on its host for water and nutrients. The plant structure is composed of only specialized stems, buds, and haustoria, lacking any leaf-like structures entirely. It spends its life underground and only emerges to flower.

== Taxonomy ==
German botanist Johann Franz Drège described Hydnora triceps in 1830 after collecting it from the Northwestern Cape. It was then thought extinct for many years until rediscovered by botanist Johann Visser in 1988. It is one of the seven or eight species of parasitic underground plants in the genus Hydnora.

== Distribution ==
Hydnora triceps is found only in the northwestern Cape and southern Namibia. Additionally, since it is entirely dependent on Euphorbia dregeana, which also seems to be its exclusive host, it is only found in association with this plant. About 10% of all the Euphorbia dregeana plants found in the regions where Hydnora triceps occurs were parasitized.

== Habitat and ecology ==
The dominant climate where Hydnora triceps is found is semi-arid. Temperatures can range from 20 to 35 °C during the day, but can reach highs of over 40 °C. The average rainfall is 350 to 700 mm (14 to 28 in). The soil is extremely dry and lacking in nutrients. The major vegetation found in this area is scattered patches of grass and shrubs. Hydnora triceps is a perennial plant, and will always be associated with a Euphorbia dregeana plant.

== Morphology ==
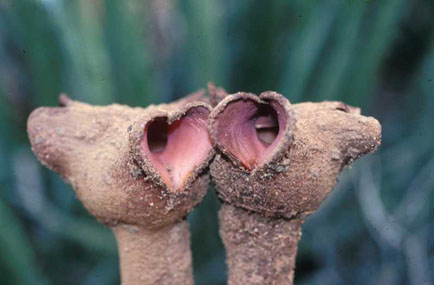
Hydnora triceps, Namaqualand, South Africa, 1999

Individuals of this species exhibit greatly reduced morphological characteristics, with no leaf structures. It has a dark brown color, and bright pink to red on the inside when alive. The body, with the exception of the dermal and conducting tissue, is made up of tannin-containing parenchymal cells. The vascular tissue of the body mirrors that of a dicotyledonous plant. There is a root-cap-like structure on the primary growth tip. Covering the entire body is a thick corky periderm, which seems to act as protection as it grows through the soil. Along the ridges of the either pentamerous or hexamerous body, are bumps of meristematic tissue. These bundles can become corky, or differentiate into flower buds, haustoria or lateral branches. The flower buds are fleshy, triangular in shape and appear white-yellowish. The flower itself is tubular with three perianth lobes that are fused together to form a cap-like structure. There are three openings for each lobe that lead to the inside of the flower which have a fleshy appearance. The appearance of the vegetative body is similar to that of a rhizome with its subterranean body, reduced morphology and root-cap structure at the tip. This structure is most likely adapted to its entirely subterranean life.

== Flowers and fruit ==
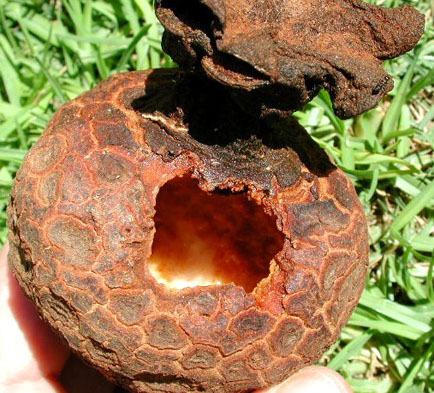
Hydnora triceps, hollowed-out fruit near Port Nolloth, South Africa, 2002

Flowers of Hydnora triceps have chambers. The androecium consists of an antheral ring, leading down a tube, to a cushion-like stigma. The length of the sub-antheral chamber varies from 2 to 10 cm (0.79 to 3.94 in) in length. In an immature flower, the antheral ring is open, and pollen develops on ridges along the outside. Then as it matures, the antheral ring closes, creating "pollen platforms" within. There is an osmophore, a scent producing structure, in the folds of each lobe which is heart shaped and white. The flower is rarely seen above ground, and if it is, only the very tip of it is seen protruding from the surface. Typically, it is found up to 5 cm (2.0 in) below the surface, and can be found by the cracks in the soil above it.

The ovary is located below the sub-antheral chamber and produces the fruits. The fruits have a tough, dark brown pericarp, which is anywhere from 1 to 10 mm thick, surrounding a white fleshy interior through which are threaded strands of minute brown seeds. The fruits can weigh anywhere from 225 to 275 g, and are 3 to 10 cm (1.2 to 3.9 in) in diameter. They taste and smell faintly of coconut, with a texture (when ripe) like a mealy apple. The fruit, technically a berry, may split at maturity. Sometimes, however, mammals simply create a hole themselves and eat the pulp. It is not known exactly which mammals eat the fruit, or what attracts them.
