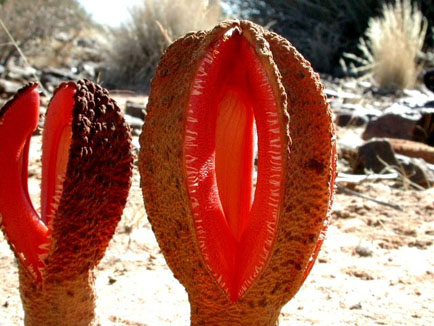
- Flowers, Karasburg Constituency, Namibia
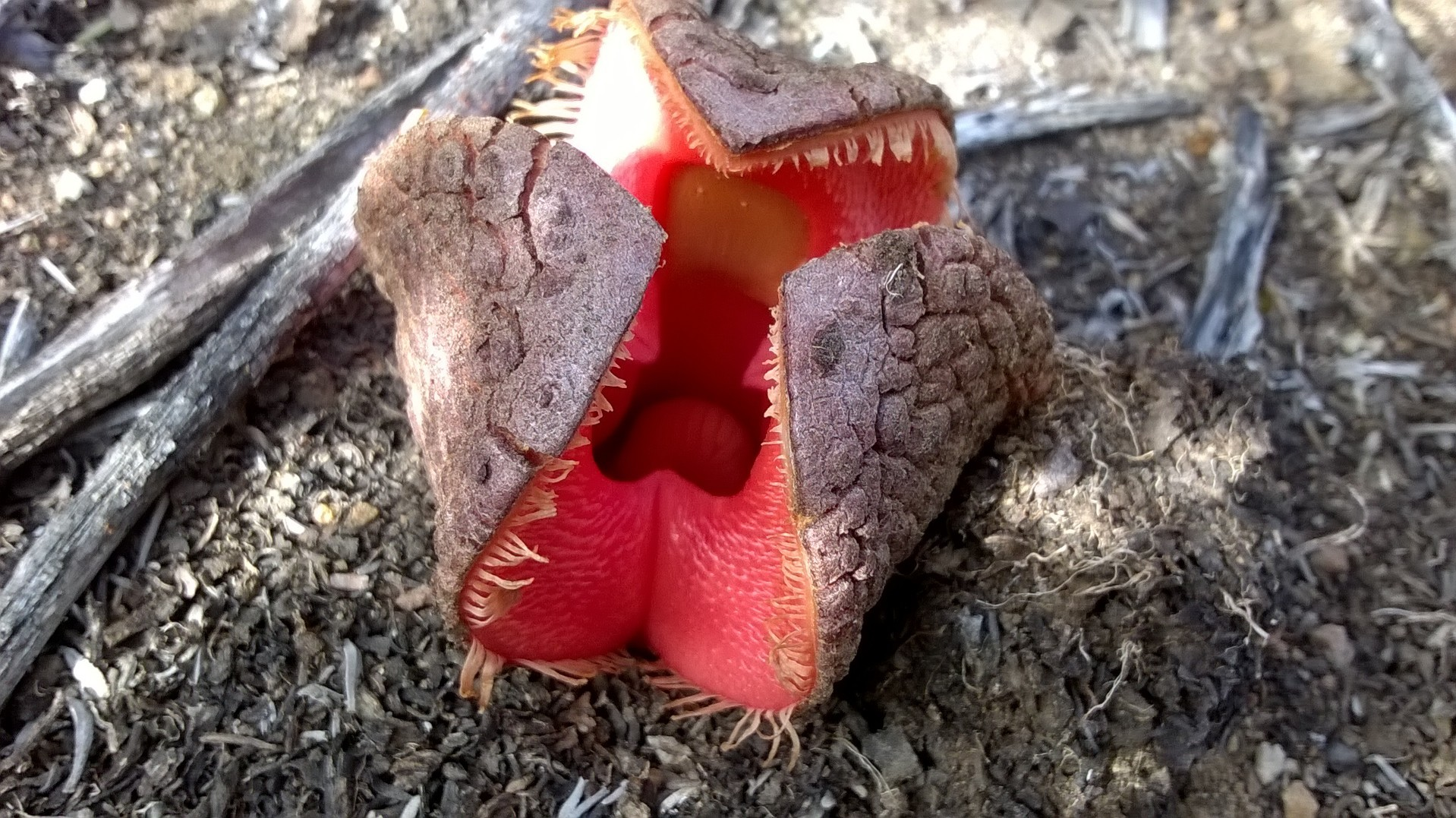
- Partially opened flower, near Robertson, South Africa

Scientific classification
- Kingdom: Plantae
- Clade: Tracheophytes
- Clade: Angiosperms
- Clade: Magnoliids
- Order: Piperales
- Family: Aristolochiaceae
- Subfamily: Hydnoroideae
- Genus: Hydnora
- Species: H. africana

Binomial name
- Hydnora africana Thunb.

Synonyms
- 3 Synonyms: Aphyteia africana (Thunb.) Oken (1841); Aphyteia hydnora Ach. (1776); Hydnora acharii Thunb. ex Hook.f. (1873)

= Hydnora africana =

Species of flowering plant in the birthwort family

Hydnora africana is an achlorophyllous plant in the subfamily Hydnoroideae, native to southern Africa that is parasitic on the roots of members of the family Euphorbiaceae.

It is also called jakkalskos or jackal food. The specific epithet africana means from Africa.

Molecular data has suggested that Hydnoroideae is a "basal angiosperm" solidifying its place among the more primitive flowering plants. Hydnoraceae are the only angiosperms known to have no leaves or scales and are considered obligate parasites, completely dependent on their hosts to survive. The plant grows underground, except for a fleshy flower that emerges above ground and emits an odour of faeces to attract its natural pollinators, dung beetles and carrion beetles. The vegetative body of the plants has been reduced to consisting only of roots and flowers. The flowers act as temporary traps, Hydnora africana is pollinated by dung and carrion beetles that are attracted to its carrion-like smell, and the flowers briefly trap the insects before letting them go covered in pollen.

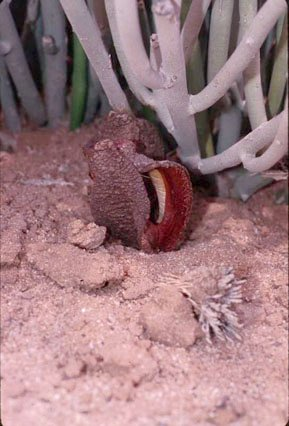
Emerging flower in the Namibian desert with Euphorbia mauritanica, near Fish River Canyon

== Morphology ==
The vegetative parts of this plant are more similar in appearance to a fungus than a plant. These plants do not have chlorophyll and do not perform photosynthesis. They obtain their nutrients entirely from a host plant, such as a species of Euphorbia. The plant is composed of thick succulent roots with no stems and the flower develops on surfaces of the host's roots. The flower is used as a temporary trap in order to facilitate pollination.

H. africana has an enzyme which allows it to dissolve some of the roots of its host plants in order to attach to them. H. africana attaches to the roots of the host and takes some of the nutrients that it makes from photosynthesis. The flower has a succulent and thick texture, the portion that appears above ground is tubular with three openings.

There are three structures botanically named perianth segments which can be compared to sepals that unite at the top of the flower. It has a fleshy peachy-orange flower that emerges from the ground after a heavy rainfall. The flower is where the perianth segments join and a short tube is present. The anterior portion of the tube there are yellowish-orange structures extend into the tube, these are the anther groups. These groups of anthers are held in bunches and are used as the flowers stamens. The anther groups are arranged into a triangle so that a gap forms between their pits and the beetles will proceed to fall down onto the stigma of the parasitic plant. The basal portion of the flower there is a cavity that houses the white ovules that will mature into seeds.

Insects that pollinate the flowers do so by burying themselves in the sepals of the flowers through the very strong fibres that hold the sepals together. After the insects have been in the flowers for a couple of days, the flower emerges and opens releasing the insects to spread the pollen to other flowers in the area.

== Fruit ==
Hydnora africana produces a fruit that grows underground, taking up to two years to ripen fully. The fruit is similar in taste and texture to a potato. Among other uses, it is used for tanning and preserving fishnets, because it is an astringent. Each fruit produces about twenty thousand seeds. The fruit may be up to about eight centimetres (3 inches) in diameter. Animals using the fruit as a source of food include, but are not limited to birds, baboons, smaller animals, jackals, porcupines, and moles.

== Smell ==
H. africana has a very strong and unpleasant smell. This smell is generated from the osmophores, which is a white spongy area on the inner surface of the tepals that eventually change colour to grey. The strong foul odor that is emitted by the plants attracts carrion beetles. These beetles become temporarily trapped in the flower, picking up pollen and carrying it to other flowers, which ensures cross-pollination. Osmophores were first called "bait bodies" by Harmes. Burger et al. concluded that the odour is made up of dimethyl disulfide and dimethyl trisulfide. These odours are also found in dead-horse arum, Helicodiceros muscivorus.

== Reproduction ==
Seeds from H. africana were brought back to the United States from Africa and planted in pots of Euphorbia. A flower of H. africana first appeared five and a half years after the initial sowing. The rotting odour serves to attract dung beetles and other insects that then become trapped within the flower walls due to the stiff bristles. The trapped insects drop down the flower tube onto the anthers where pollen adheres to its body. It then falls farther down onto the stigma.

== Uses ==
H. africana can be harvested and used as food, medicine, and a good source of tannin.

Rhizome extracts are used as an anti-dysenteric treatment in South Africa.

== Conservation ==
Climate change can gravely affect sexual reproduction. Conservation efforts are not being made to rescue the H. africana. "...if pollinators disappear and might limit seed dispersal...In addition, they are being removed at a rapid rate for agricultural land expansion and overexploitation for medicinal use...". With their extensive research, they have found that H. africana thrive in deeply moist environments surrounded by their pollinators. Since land is being destroyed and this organism is being exploited through its sale, their numbers will exponentially decline over time. "Our results show that the precipitation of the wettest month..was the most important variable contributing to the distribution of the two Hydnora species. This finding indicates that apart from the necessity of water for survival, ground moisture is an essential factor for most subterranean plants...adequate ground moisture levels are required for the relatively soft-tissued Hydnora flowers to break through the ground... which completes its entire life cycle below ground)." As the climate gets warmer and warmer every year, H. africana loses its germination and goes extinct. Conservation efforts need to be made immediately in order to prevent its extinction.
