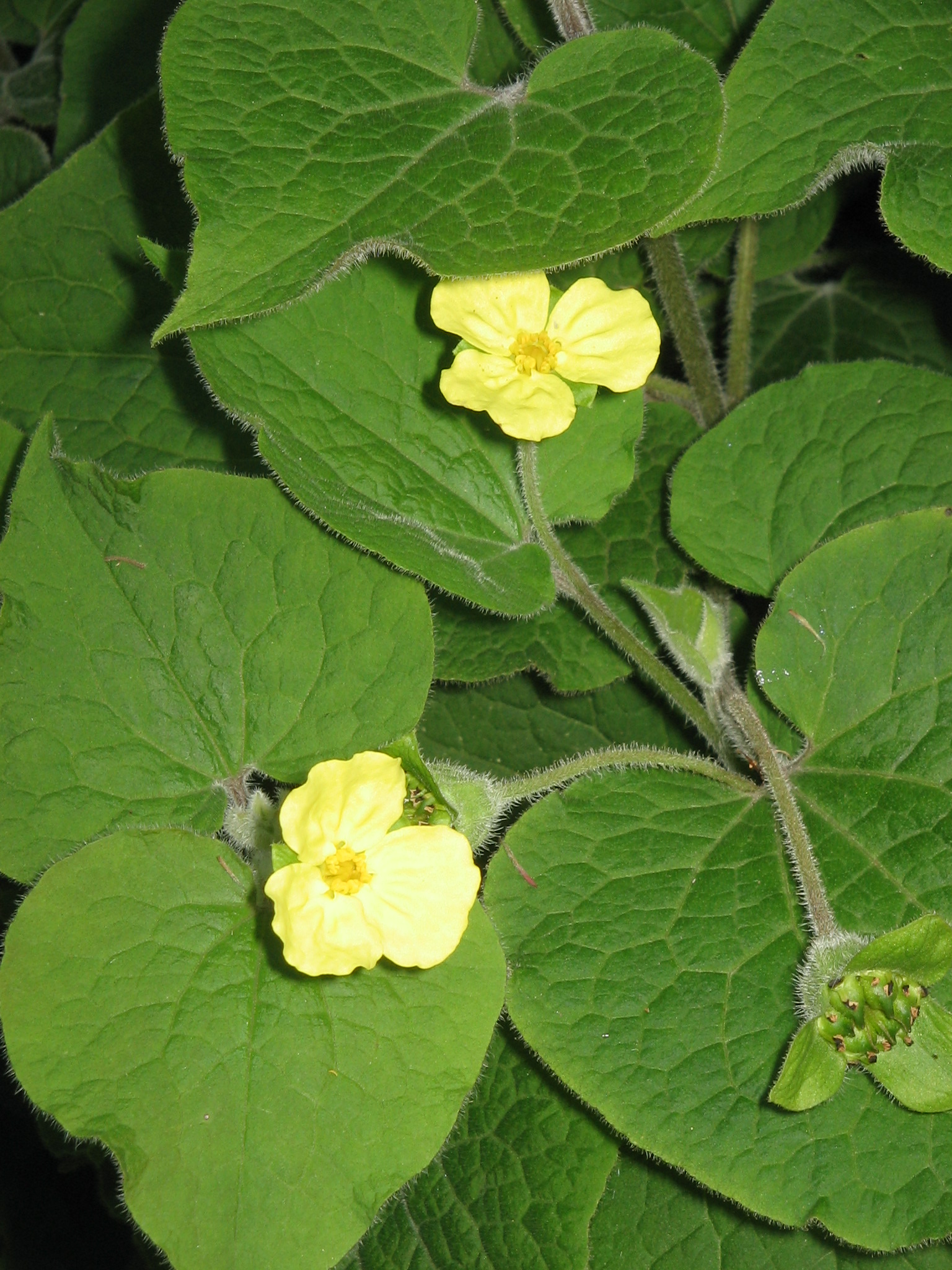

Conservation status
- Endangered (IUCN 3.1)

Scientific classification
- Kingdom: Plantae
- Clade: Tracheophytes
- Clade: Angiosperms
- Clade: Magnoliids
- Order: Piperales
- Family: Aristolochiaceae
- Subfamily: Asaroideae
- Genus: Saruma; Oliv.
- Species: S. henryi

Binomial name
- Saruma henryi Oliv.

= Saruma =

Genus of flowering plants

Saruma is a monotypic genus of flowering plants in the family Aristolochiaceae containing the single species Saruma henryi. It is endemic to China, where it occurs in Gansu, Guizhou, Hubei, Jiangxi, Shaanxi, and Sichuan.

This species is a perennial herb growing from a system of rhizomes. The erect stem is up to a meter tall. The heart-shaped leaves are up to 15 by 13 centimeters. It produces yellowish or yellow-green flowers. The fruit is a follicle.
