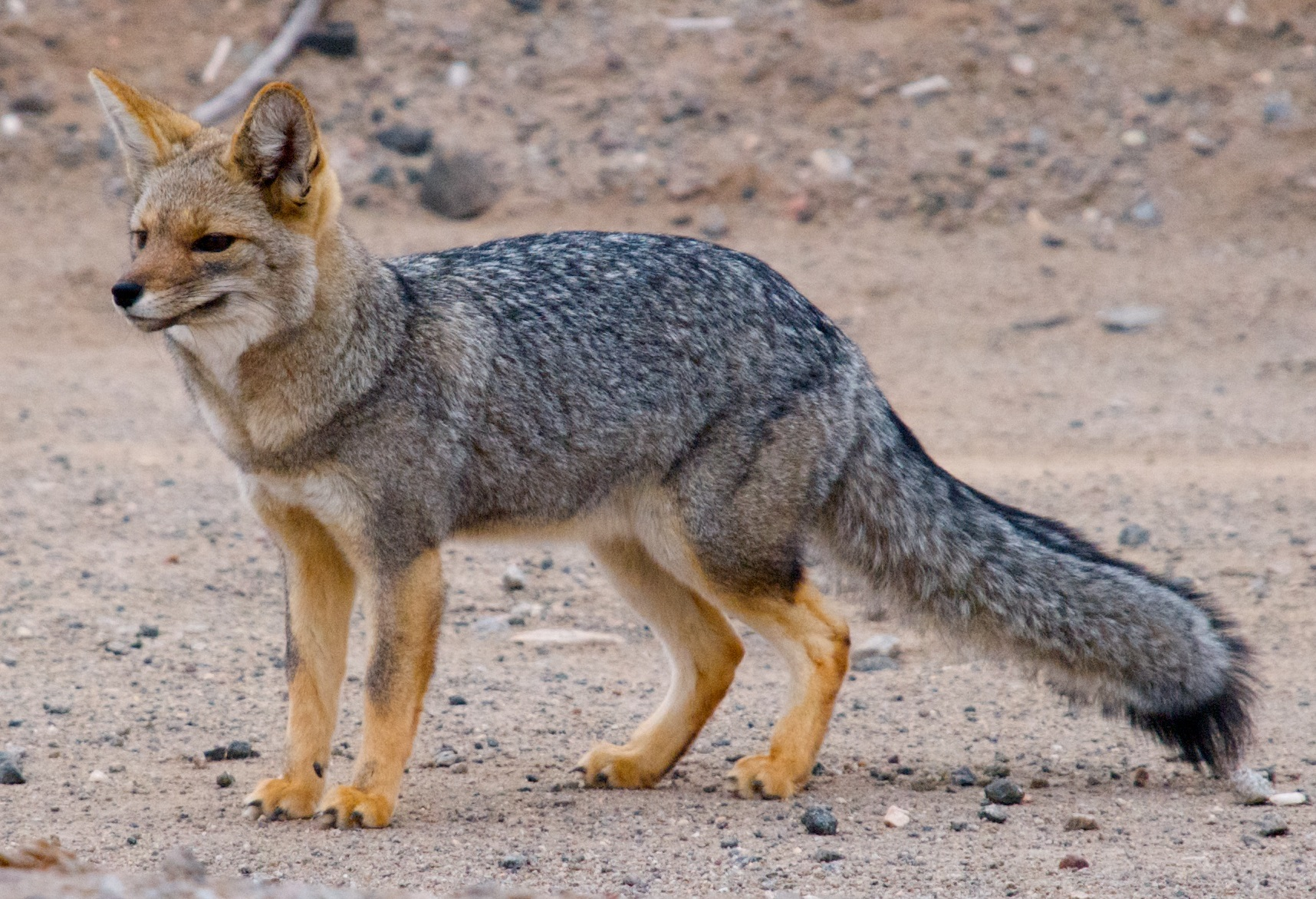

Conservation status
- Least Concern (IUCN 3.1)
- CITES Appendix II

Scientific classification
- Kingdom: Animalia
- Phylum: Chordata
- Class: Mammalia
- Order: Carnivora
- Family: Canidae
- Genus: Lycalopex
- Species: L. griseus

Binomial name
- Lycalopex griseus (Gray, 1837)
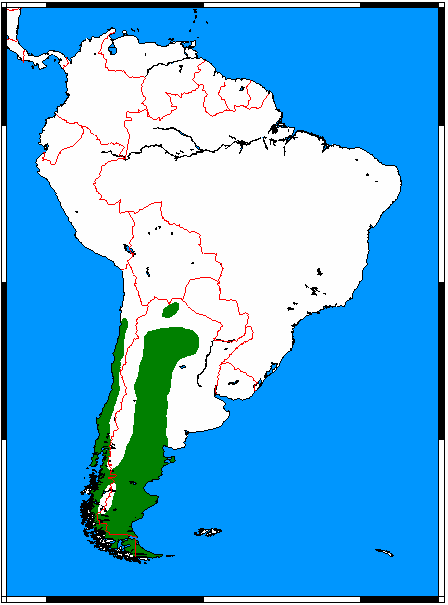
- Distribution of the South American gray fox

Synonyms
- Dusicyon griseus; Pseudalopex griseus (Gray, 1837)

= South American gray fox =

Species of carnivore

The South American gray fox (Lycalopex griseus), also known as the Patagonian fox, the chilla or zorro gris (gray fox or gray zorro), is a South American species of Lycalopex (the "false" or lesser foxes) in the Canidae family, which includes dogs, wolves, jackals, coyotes and foxes, among other canids. It is endemic to the southern parts of Argentina and Chile, primarily Patagonia.

== Description ==
The South American gray fox is a small fox-like canid, weighing 2.5 to 5.45 kilograms (5.5 to 12.0 lb), and measuring 65 to 110 centimetres (26 to 43 in) in length including a tail of 20 to 43 cm (8 to 17 in). The head is reddish-brown flecked with white. The ears are large and there is a distinct black spot on the chin. The pelage is brindled, with agouti guard hairs and a short, dense, pale undercoat. The underparts are pale grey. The limbs are tawny and the thighs are crossed by a dark bar. The long, bushy tail has a dark dorsal stripe and dark tip with a paler, mottled underside.

The South American gray fox breeds in early austral autumn, around March. After a gestation period of two months, two to four kits are born in a den. Not much else is recorded about its lifestyle.

== Range and habitat ==
The South American gray fox is found in Argentina and Chile in the Southern Cone of South America. Its range comprises stripes on both sides of the Andes mountain range between parallels 17ºS (northernmost Chile) and 54ºS (Tierra del Fuego).

In Argentina, this species inhabits the western semiarid region of the country, from the Andean spurs (ca. 69ºW) to meridian 66ºW. South from the Río Grande, the distribution of the fox widens reaching the Atlantic coast. In Chile, it is present throughout the country. Its presence in Peru has been mentioned; to date, however, there has been no confirmation of it. The South American gray fox was introduced to the Falkland Islands in the late 1920s early 1930s and is still present in quite large numbers on Beaver and Weddell Islands plus several smaller islands. It was also introduced to Tierra del Fuego in 1951 to control European rabbit populations. The South American gray fox occurs in a variety of habitats, from the warm, arid scrublands of the Argentine uplands and the cold, arid Patagonian steppe to the forests of southernmost Chile.

== Diet ==
The diet varies in different parts of its range and at different times of year. It consists mainly of mammals, birds, arthropods, bird eggs, reptiles, fruit and carrion. The main prey items seem to be small mammals, especially rodents. Fruits eaten include Cryptocarya alba, Lithraea caustica and Prosopanche spp.

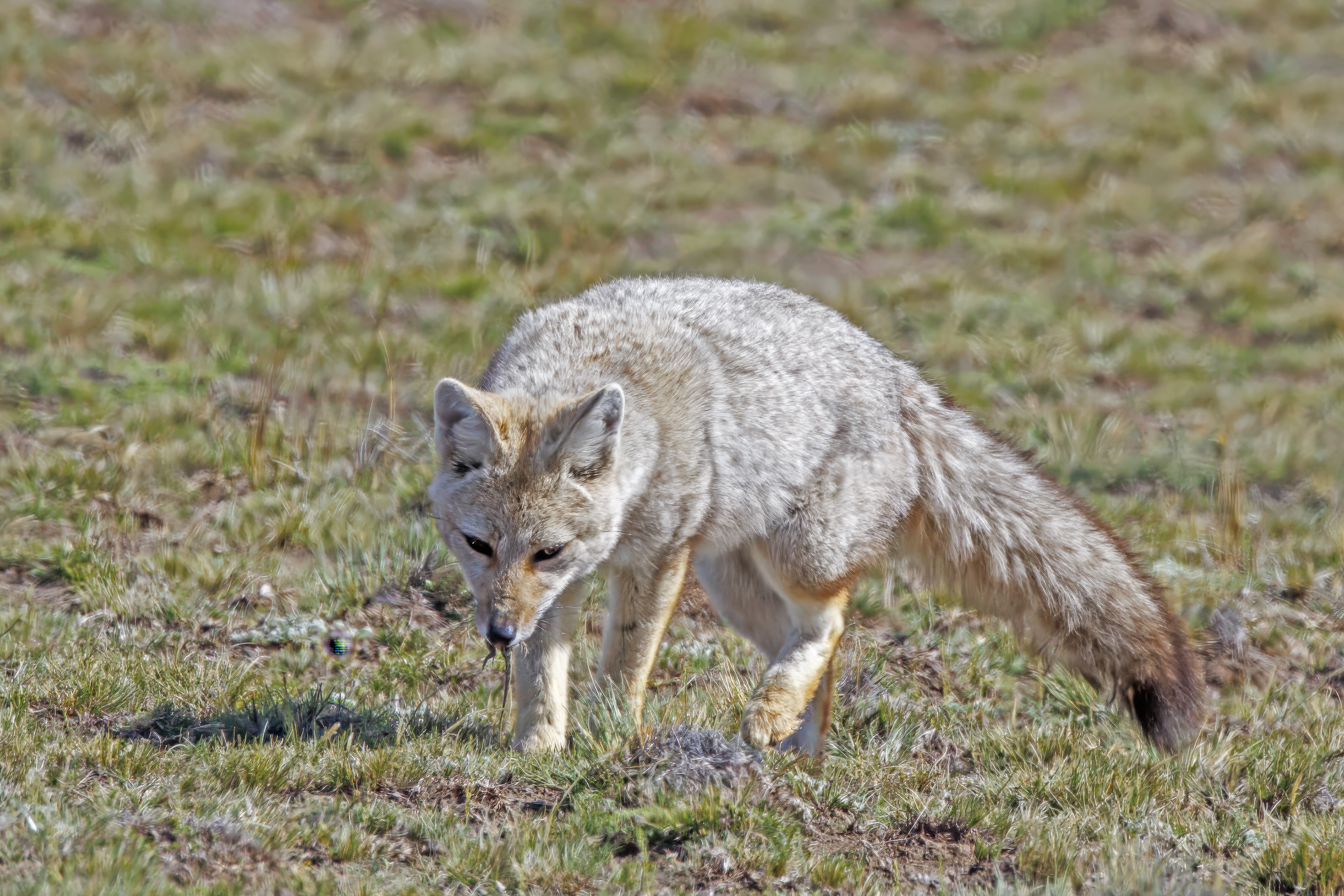
Feeding on a lizard

Feeding on a Magellanic penguin carcass

== Phylogeny ==
The following phylogenetic tree shows the evolutionary relationships between the Lycalopex species, based on molecular analysis of mitochondrial DNA control region sequences by a study in 2016.

- Lycalopex
  - Hoary fox
  - - Sechuran fox
    - - - Darwin's fox
        - Pampas fox
      - - South American gray fox
        - Culpeo

== Interaction with environment ==
Foxes killed by sheep farmers and displayed on a ranch fence in Deseado, Argentina

The South American gray fox is a largely solitary animal that has long been hunted for its pelt. The foxes sometimes go near human habitations in search of food, such as chickens and sheep, but tend to avoid areas visited by dogs. They are useful in their role as scavengers of carrion and as dispersers of the seeds of the fruit they eat.

Where their ranges overlap, the South American gray fox is in competition with the larger culpeo fox. The former consumes a greater proportion of rodents, and arthropods make a significant portion of its diet, while the culpeo tends to consume larger prey, including the non-native European hare which has been introduced into Chile. These prey animals are partitioned between these two species, with the gray fox being excluded from the best prey territories by the larger culpeo.

== Gallery ==
A skulk of South American gray foxes in Torres del Paine National Park, Chile

In Uruguay

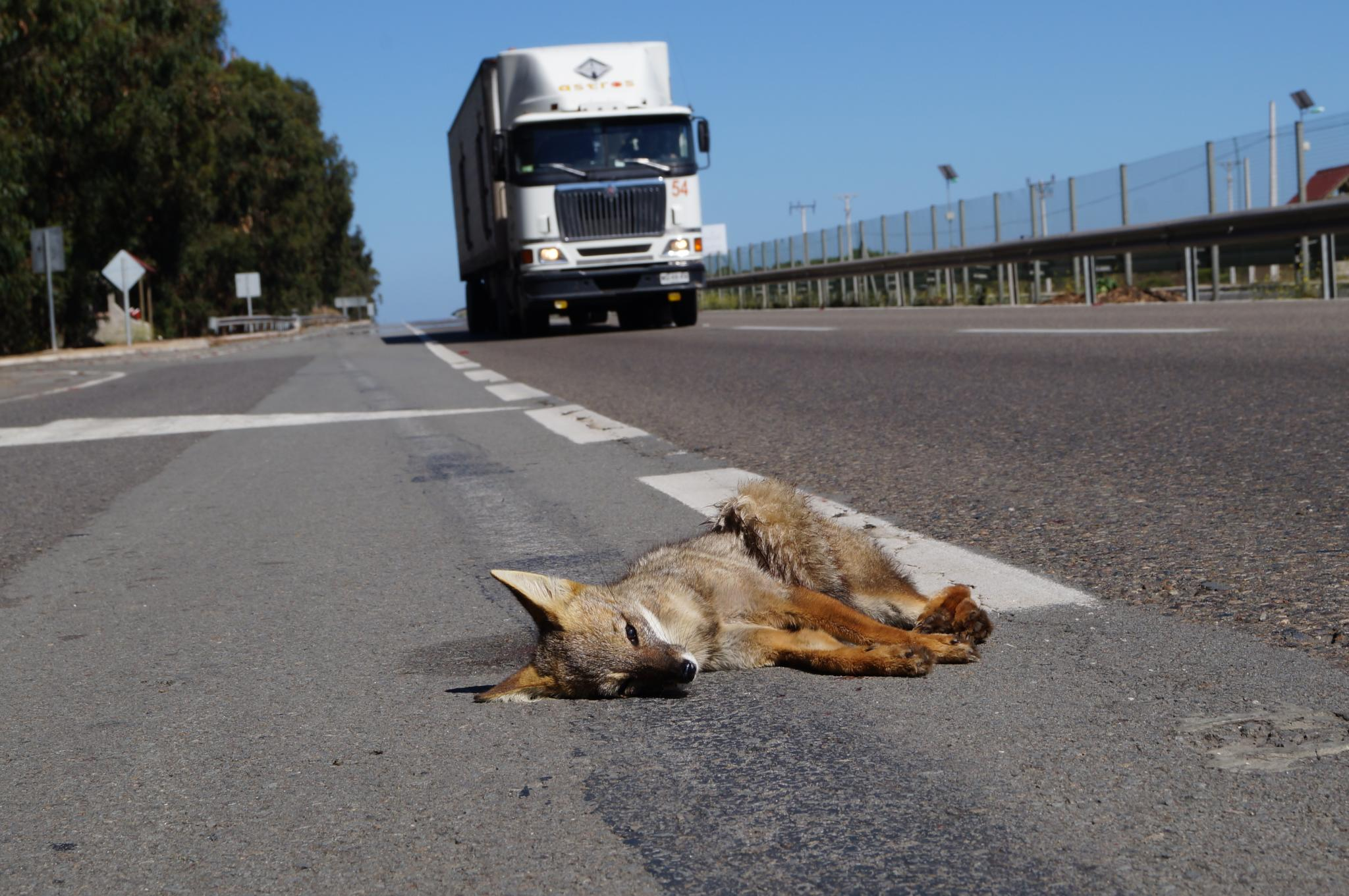
Roadkill in Chile
