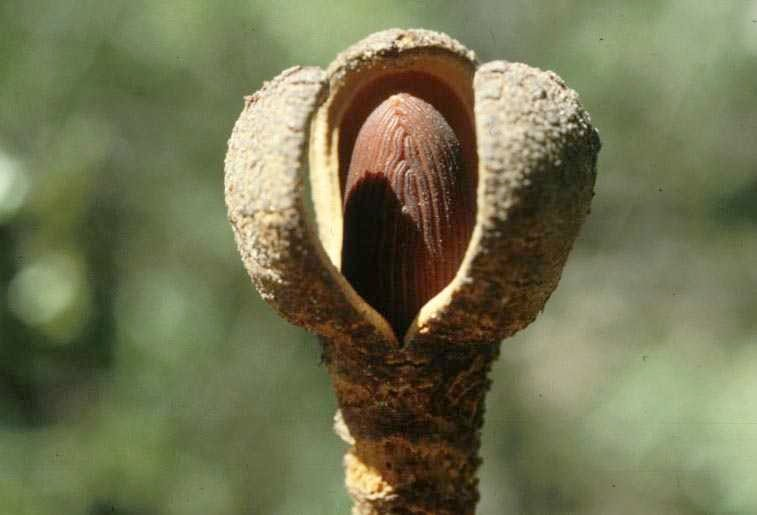
- Prosopanche americana

Scientific classification
- Kingdom: Plantae
- Clade: Tracheophytes
- Clade: Angiosperms
- Clade: Magnoliids
- Order: Piperales
- Family: Aristolochiaceae
- Subfamily: Hydnoroideae; Walpers

Genera
- Hydnora Thunb. Prosopanche de Bary
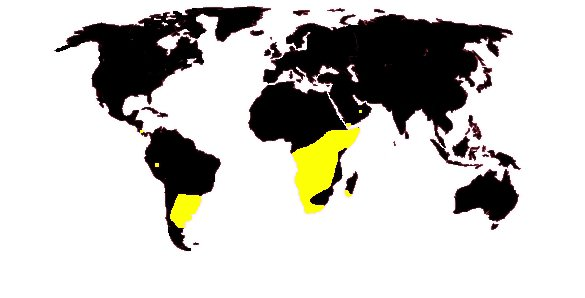
- Hydnoroideae distribution map

= Hydnoroideae =

Subfamily of parasitic flowering plants

Hydnoroideae is a subfamily of parasitic flowering plants in the order Piperales. Traditionally, and as recently as the APG III system it given family rank under the name Hydnoraceae. It is now submerged in the Aristolochiaceae. It contains two genera, Hydnora and Prosopanche:

- Prosopanche is native to Central and South America;
- Hydnora can be found in semi-arid to desert regions of Africa, the Arabian Peninsula, and Madagascar.

Members of this subfamily have been described as the strangest plants in the world.

== Description ==
The most striking aspect of the Hydnoroideae is probably the complete absence of leaves (not even in modified forms such as scales). Some species are mildly thermogenic (capable of producing heat), presumably as a means of dispersing their scent.

=== Morphology in pictures ===
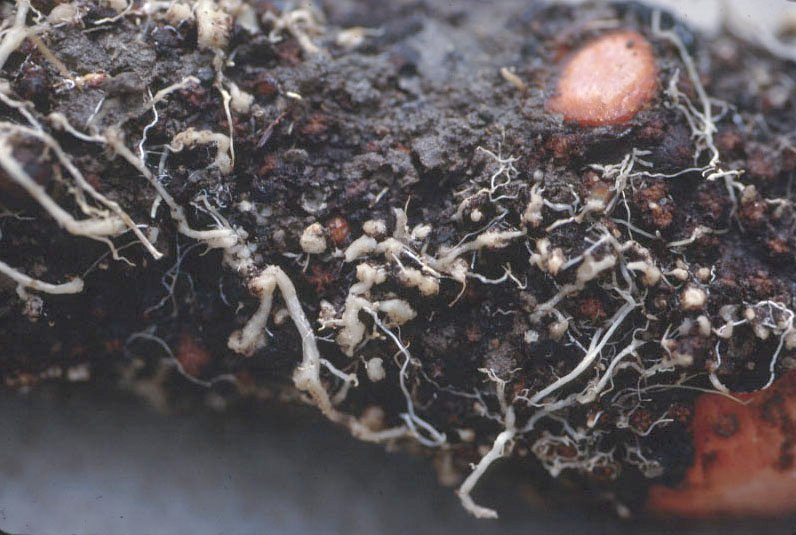
Hydnora johannis, young plant in Um Barona, Wad Medani, Sudan.

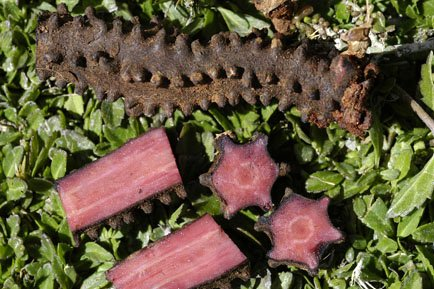
Hydnora triceps, roots at Gemsbokvlei Farm, Wolfberg Road, southeast of Port Nolloth, South Africa, 2003

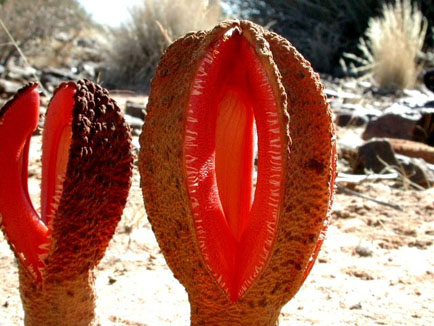
Flower of Hydnora africana in Karasburg District, Namibia, 2002.

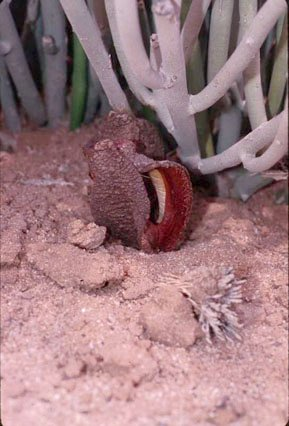
Emerging flower of Hydnora africana in a desert dominated by Euphorbia mauritanica near Fish River Canyon, in the south of Namibia, 2000

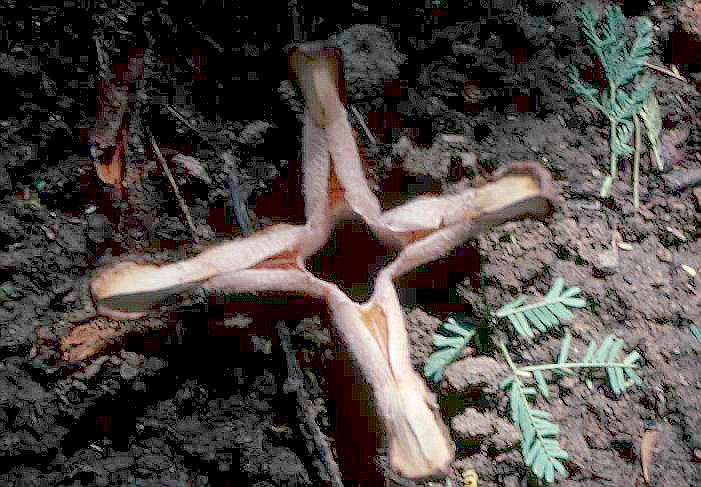
Hydnora johannis in flower in Um Barona, Wad Medani, Sudan

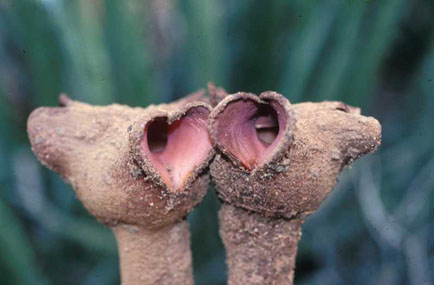
Flowers of Hydnora triceps in Namaqualand, South Africa, 1999

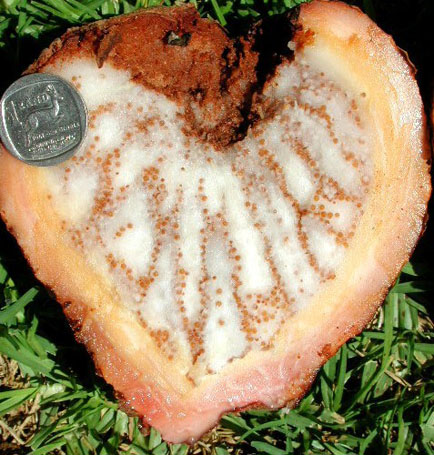
Hydnora triceps, freshly cut fruit near Port Nolloth, South Africa, 2002

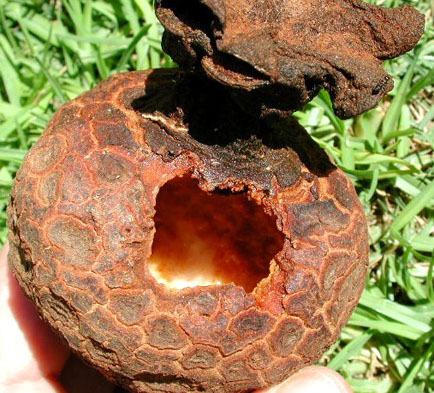
Hydnora triceps, hollowed out mature fruit near Port Nolloth, South Africa, 2002

== Ecology ==
The plants are pollinated by insects such as dermestid beetles or carrion flies, attracted by the fetid odor of the flowers. In Hydnora africana there are bait bodies with a strong smell, whereas in Hydnora johannis the scent comes from a region at the tip of the perianth called a cucullus. The flowers may be above ground or underground. The fruits have edible, fragrant pulp, which attracts animals such as porcupines, monkeys, jackals, rhinoceros, and armadillos, as well as humans. The host plants, in the case of Hydnora, generally are in the family Euphorbiaceae and the genus Acacia. Hosts for Prosopanche include various species of Prosopis and other legumes.

== Biochemistry ==
The plants contain high levels of tannins.

== Genomics ==
The highly reduced plastid genome map of a member of Hydnoroideae, Hydnora visseri

The complete plastid genome sequence of one species of Hydnoroideae, Hydnora visseri, has been determined. As compared to the chloroplast genome of its closest photosynthetic relatives, the plastome of Hydnora visseri shows extreme reduction in both size (27,233 bp) and gene content (24 genes appear to be functional). The plastome of Hydnora visseri is therefore one of the smallest among flowering plants.

== Classification ==
Like many parasitic plants, the affinities with non-parasitic plants are not obvious, and 19th and 20th century botanists proposed a variety of placements for the taxon. Molecular data places them in the Piperales, and nested within the Aristolochiaceae and allied with the Piperaceae or Saururaceae.
