= Euglypha rojasiana =

Scientific classification
- Kingdom: Plantae
- Clade: Tracheophytes
- Clade: Angiosperms
- Clade: Magnoliids
- Order: Piperales
- Family: Aristolochiaceae
- Genus: Euglypha; Chodat & Hassl. (1906)
- Species: E. rojasiana

Binomial name
- Euglypha rojasiana Chodat & Hassl. (1906)

Species of plant

Euglypha rojasiana is a species of flowering plant in family Aristolochiaceae. It is a liana native to Bolivia, Paraguay, northeastern Argentina, and central Brazil. It is the sole species in genus Euglypha.
