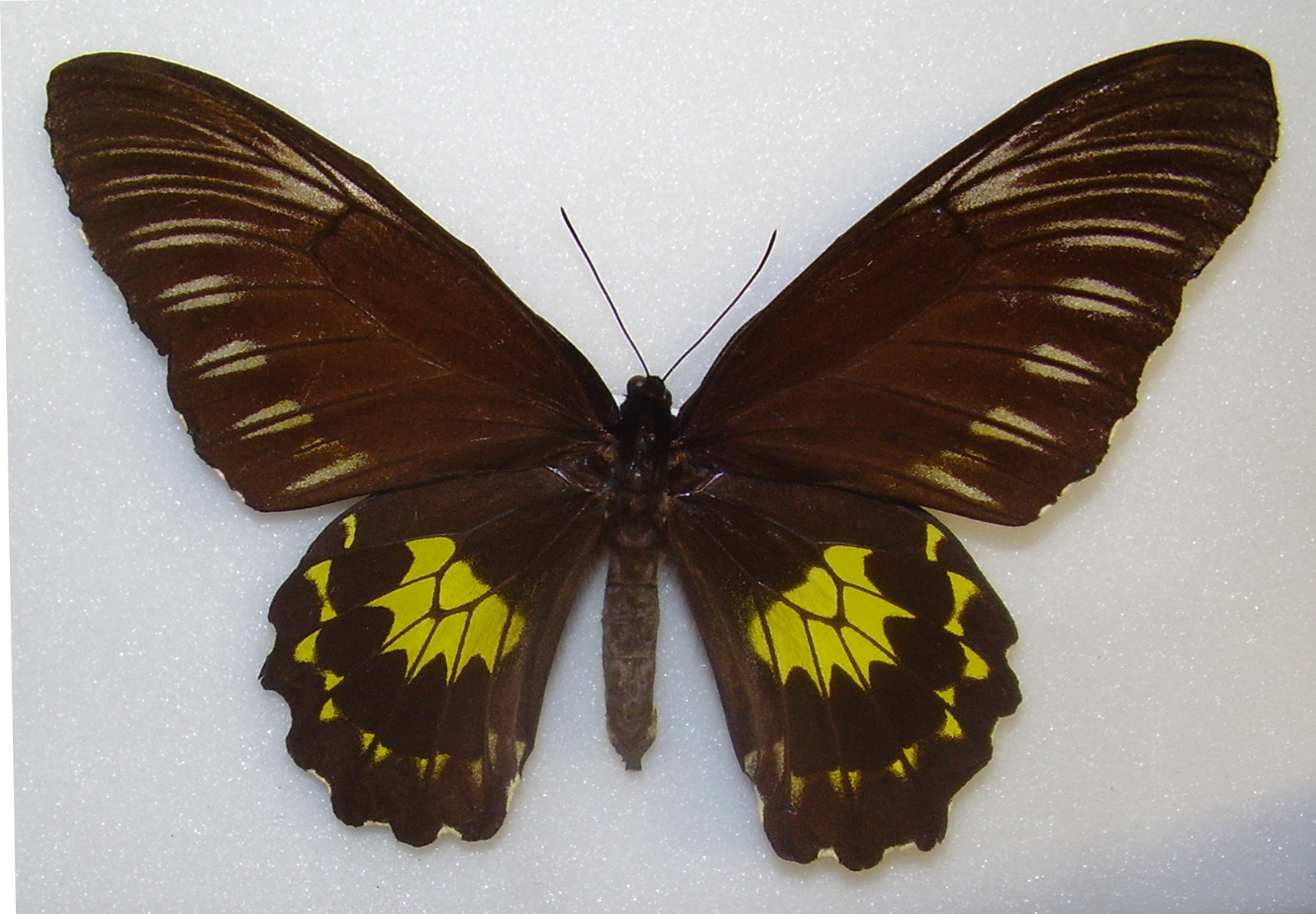
- T. m. neomiranda female, upperside

Conservation status
- Least Concern (IUCN 3.1)
- CITES Appendix II

Scientific classification
- Kingdom: Animalia
- Phylum: Arthropoda
- Clade: Pancrustacea
- Class: Insecta
- Order: Lepidoptera
- Family: Papilionidae
- Genus: Troides
- Species: T. miranda

Binomial name
- Troides miranda Butler, 1869

= Troides miranda =

Miranda birdwing

Species of butterfly

Troides miranda, the Miranda birdwing, is a birdwing butterfly that inhabits Borneo and Sumatra.

Troides miranda is a large butterfly with a wingspan ranging from 150 mm to 170 mm, with inconspicuously scalloped wings, black head and thorax and yellow abdomen. There is a sexual dimorphism of colour.

Males have black forewings with veins discreetly outlined in white in the postdiscal part, and yellow hindwings with black veins and a marginal border of black serrations.

The females, larger than the males, have brown forewings with white-edged veins, and brown hind wings with a small yellow central space veined with brown and a submarginal line of yellow chevrons.

== Subspecies ==
- Troides miranda miranda North Borneo.
- Troides miranda hayamii Kobayashi, 1991 Southwest Borneo
- Troides miranda neomiranda (Fruhstorfer, 1903) Sumatra

== Biology ==
The larva feeds on aristoloches- Aristolochia .

== Related species ==
Troides miranda is a member of the Troides amphrysus species group. The members of this clade are:

- Troides amphrysus (Cramer, [1779])
- Troides andromache (Staudinger, 1892)
- Troides cuneifera (Oberthür, 1879)
- Troides miranda (Butler, 1869)
