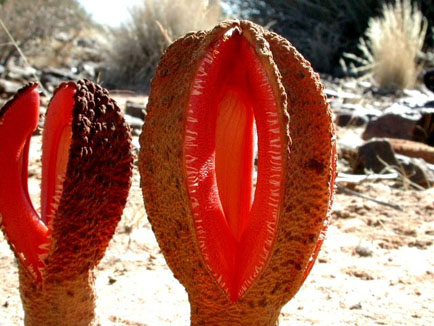
- Hydnora africana

Scientific classification
- Kingdom: Plantae
- Clade: Embryophytes
- Clade: Tracheophytes
- Clade: Angiosperms
- Clade: Magnoliids
- Order: Piperales
- Family: Aristolochiaceae
- Subfamily: Hydnoroideae
- Genus: Hydnora; Thunb.

Synonyms
- Aphyteia Ach.

= Hydnora =

Genus of flowering plants in the birthwort family

Hydnora is a group of parasitic plants described as a genus in 1775. It is native to Africa, Madagascar, and the Arabian Peninsula. Hydnora pollinates through brood-site mimicry. This is a method of pollination in which the plant emits a smell that is attractive to insects, so that the plant can trap the insect and allow it to take pollen so that it can pollinate other Hydnora. Hydnora cannot photosynthesize and rely on host plants for nutrients. They are plants that are rooted underground and have the ability to damage infrastructures by bursting through pavements.

== Taxonomy ==
The following species are listed within the genus Hydnora:

Image	Scientific name	Distribution
	Hydnora abyssinica A.Br.	Oman, Yemen, Saudi Arabia; S + C + SE + E Africa from Eritrea + Sudan to Namibia + KwaZulu-Natal
	Hydnora africana Thunb.	Angola, Namibia, Cape Province
	Hydnora arabica Bolin & Musselman	Oman & Yemen
	Hydnora esculenta Jum. & H.Perrier	Madagascar
	Hydnora sinandevu Beentje & Q.Luke	Kenya, Tanzania
	Hydnora triceps Drège & E.Mey.	Northern Cape Province, Namibia
	Hydnora visseri Bolin, E.Maass, & Musselman	Northern Cape Province, Namibia

=== Etymology ===
The genus name Hydnora derives from the ancient Greek ὕδνον, 'truffle', because of the somatic structure of this root parasite.

== Genomics ==
The highly reduced plastid genome map of a species of Hydnora (H. visseri)

One of the smallest plastid genomes among flowering plants has been found in the genus Hydnora. As compared to the chloroplast genome of its closest photosynthetic relatives, the plastome of Hydnora visseri shows extreme reduction in both size (ca. 27 kilo base pairs) and gene content (24 genes appear to be functional).

== Ethnobotany ==
Other Hydnora species are known to be available in Southern African herbal markets in Mozambique and South Africa. In South Africa the Imbola yesiXhosa are reported to use a thin paste of the powdered Hydnora rhizome as a treatment for acne and other skin conditions. In Uganda, the Hydnora spp. are reported to be used as food (fruits) and medicine (rhizomes) for diarrhea, hypertension, and diabetes, though these claims have not been confirmed.
