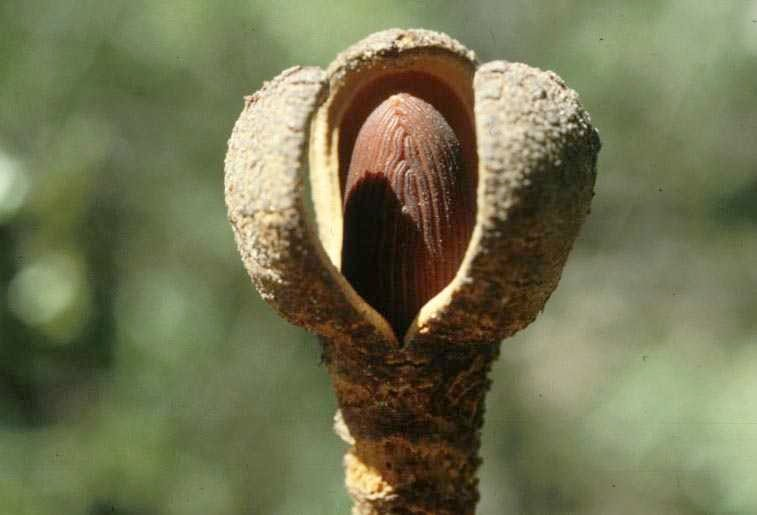
- Prosopanche americana

Scientific classification
- Kingdom: Plantae
- Clade: Tracheophytes
- Clade: Angiosperms
- Clade: Magnoliids
- Order: Piperales
- Family: Aristolochiaceae
- Subfamily: Hydnoroideae
- Genus: Prosopanche de Bary

= Prosopanche =

Genus of parasitic plants

Prosopanche is a group of parasitic plants described as a genus in 1868.

It is native to South America and Central America.

== Taxonomy ==
The following species are listed within the genus Prosopanche:

1. Prosopanche americana (R.Br.) Baill. - Pasco, N Argentina, S Brazil
2. Prosopanche bonacinae Speg. - Argentina, Paraguay, Rio Grande do Sul
3. Prosopanche caatingicola R.F.Machado & L.P.Queiroz - Bahia
4. Prosopanche cocuccii Tav. de Carvalho, Záchia & Mariath - Rio Grande do Sul
5. Prosopanche costaricensis L.D.Gómez - Costa Rica
6. Prosopanche demogorgoni Funez - Santa Catarina
7. Prosopanche panguanensis C.Martel & Rob.Fern. - Peru
