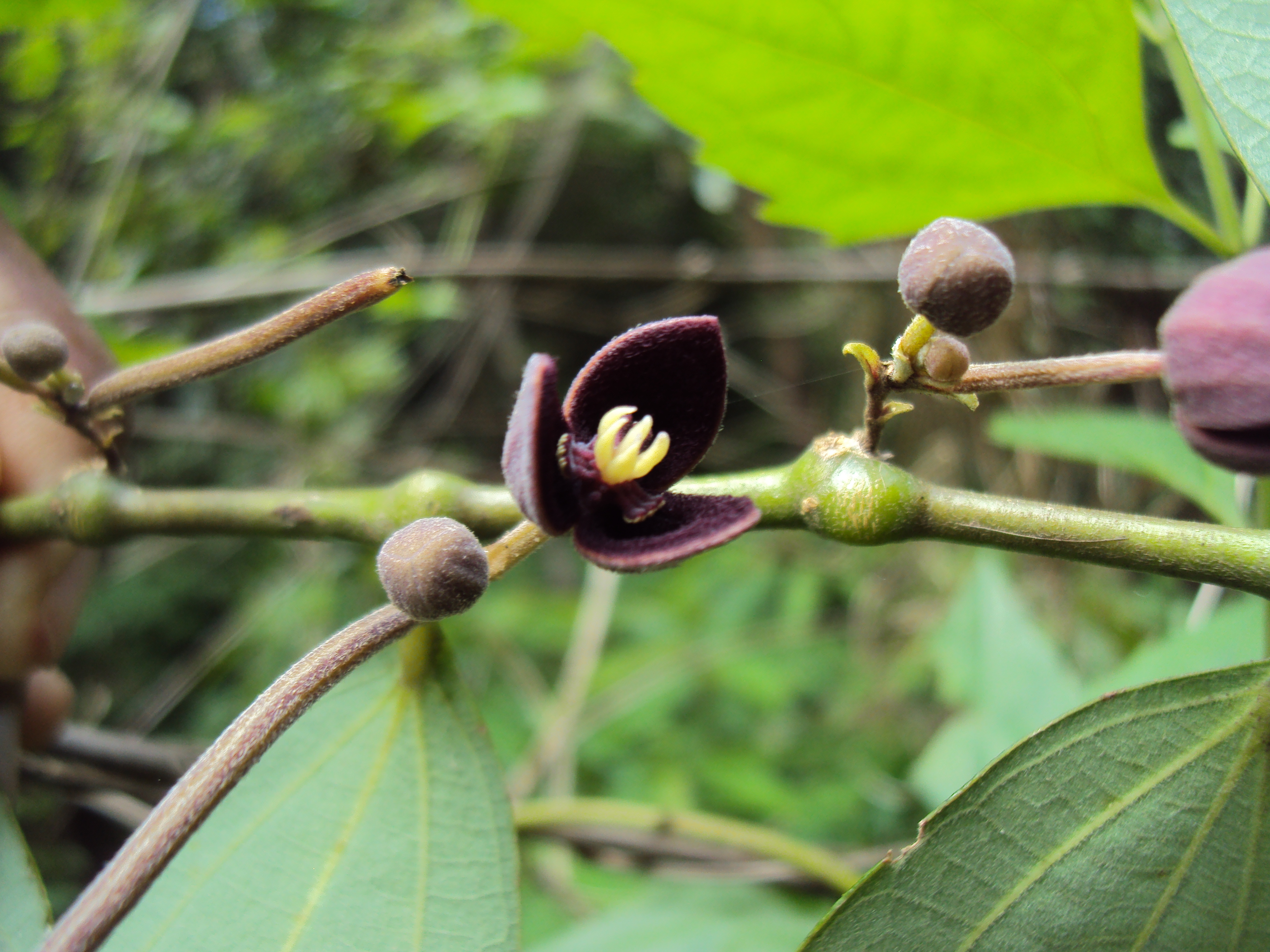
- Thottea sivarajanii

Scientific classification
- Kingdom: Plantae
- Clade: Tracheophytes
- Clade: Angiosperms
- Clade: Magnoliids
- Order: Piperales
- Family: Aristolochiaceae
- Subfamily: Aristolochioideae
- Genus: Thottea; Rottb.

Species
- See text.

Synonyms
- Apama Lam. Bragantia Lour. Ceramium Blume; Cyclodiscus Klotzsch; Lobbia Planch. Strakaea C.Presl; Trimeriza Lindl.

= Thottea =

Genus of flowering plants

Thottea is a genus of flowering plants in the pipevine family, Aristolochiaceae.

== Accepted species ==
Plants of the World Online currently includes:

1. Thottea abrahamii Dan, P.J.Mathew, Unnithan & Pushp.
2. Thottea adichilthottiana Sunil & Naveen Kum.
3. Thottea anthonysamyi T.L.Yao
4. Thottea barberi (Gamble) Ding Hou
5. Thottea beccarii Ding Hou
6. Thottea beungongtanoeh Mustaqim
7. Thottea borneensis Valeton
8. Thottea celebica Ding Hou
9. Thottea curvisemen Ding Hou
10. Thottea dalzellii (Hook.f.) Karthik. & Moorthy
11. Thottea dependens (Planch.) Klotzsch
12. Thottea dinghoui Swarupan.
13. Thottea duchartrei Sivar., A.Babu & Balach.
14. Thottea grandiflora Rottb.
  type species (Myanmar to Peninsular Malaysia)
15. Thottea hainanensis (Merr. & Chun) Ding Hou
16. Thottea idukkiana Pandur. & V.J.Nair
17. Thottea kamarudiniana T.L.Yao
18. Thottea longipedunculata T.L.Yao
19. Thottea macrantha (Boerl.) Ding Hou
20. Thottea macrophylla Becc.
21. Thottea muluensis Ding Hou
22. Thottea papilionis T.L.Yao
23. Thottea parviflora Ridl.
24. Thottea paucifida Ding Hou
25. Thottea penitilobata Ding Hou
26. Thottea philippinensis Quisumb.
27. Thottea piperiformis (Griff.) Mabb.
28. Thottea piscodora T.L.Yao
29. Thottea ponmudiana Sivar.
30. Thottea praetermissa T.L.Yao
31. Thottea racemosa (Lour.) Ding Hou
32. Thottea reflexa T.L.Yao
33. Thottea reniloba Ding Hou
34. Thottea rhizantha Becc.
35. Thottea ruthiae T.L.Yao
36. Thottea sasidharaniana Robi
37. Thottea siliquosa (Lam.) Ding Hou
38. Thottea sivarajanii E.S.S.Kumar, A.E.S.Khan & Binu
39. Thottea straatmanii Ding Hou
40. Thottea sumatrana (Merr.) Ding Hou
41. Thottea terengganuensis T.L.Yao
42. Thottea tomentosa (Blume) Ding Hou (Indochina, W. Malesia)
43. Thottea tricornis Maingay ex Hook.f.
44. Thottea triserialis Ding Hou
