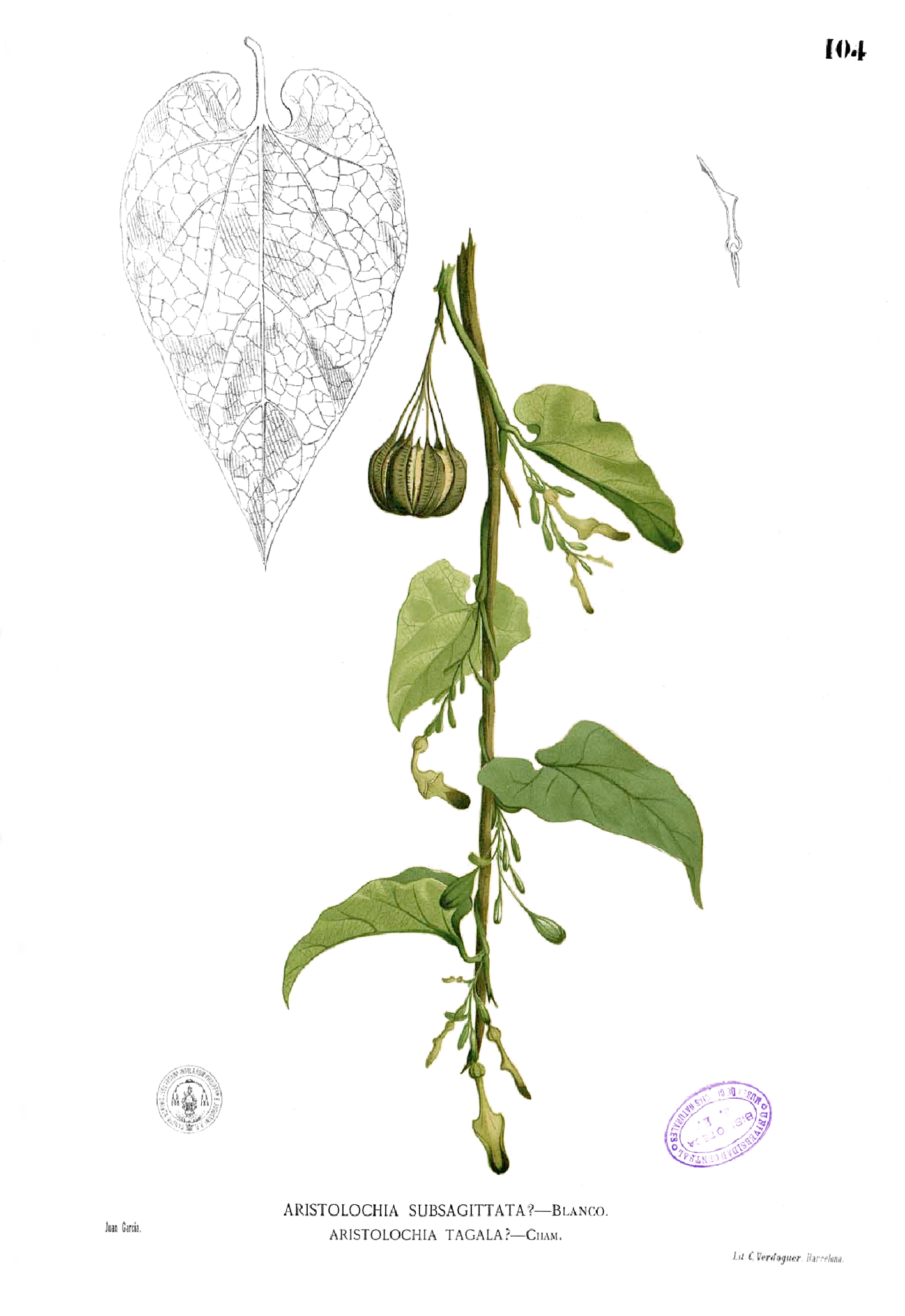

Scientific classification
- Kingdom: Plantae
- Clade: Tracheophytes
- Clade: Angiosperms
- Clade: Magnoliids
- Order: Piperales
- Family: Aristolochiaceae
- Genus: Aristolochia
- Species: A. acuminata

Binomial name
- Aristolochia acuminata Lamarck

= Aristolochia acuminata =

Species of vine

Aristolochia acuminata, the native Dutchman's pipe or Indian birthwort is a poisonous perennial vine that is endemic to Asia and Malesia, New Guinea and the Solomon Islands and northern Australia.

== Description ==
Aristolochia acuminata is an evergreen vine. The hypanthium flowers are between 10 and 13 mm long. It also has capsuled ellipsoid fruits.

== Bibliography ==
- Data related to Aristolochia acuminata at Wikispecies
- Media related to Aristolochia acuminata at Wikimedia Commons
- Lamarck, J.B.A.P de Monnet (1783) Encycl. 1: 254. Type: India, Commerson.Holo: P.
