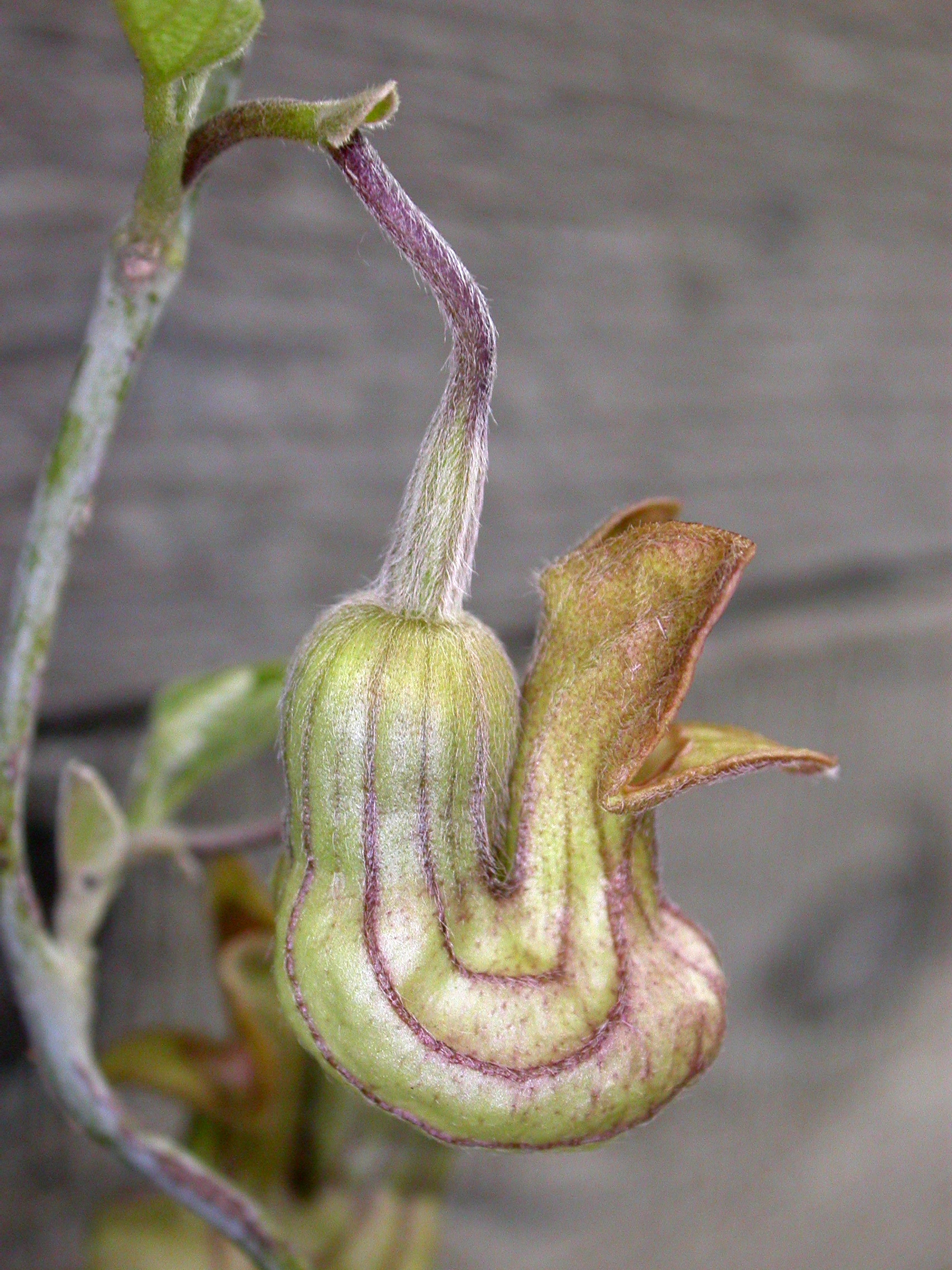
- California pipevine (Aristolochia californica)

Scientific classification
- Kingdom: Plantae
- Clade: Tracheophytes
- Clade: Angiosperms
- Clade: Magnoliids
- Order: Piperales
- Family: Aristolochiaceae; Juss.

Subfamilies
- Aristolochioideae; Asaroideae; Hydnoroideae; Lactoridoideae

Synonyms
- Asaraceae Ventenat 1799; Hydnoraceae Agardh 1821 nom. cons.; Lactoridaceae Engler 1888 nom. cons.; Pistolochiaceae J. B. Müll. 1841; Sarumaceae Nakai 1936 nom. nud.

= Aristolochiaceae =

Aristolochiaceae Temporal range: Aptian - recent

Family of flowering plants

The Aristolochiaceae (English: /əˌrɪstəˈloʊkiəsii/) are a family, the birthwort family, of flowering plants with eight genera and about 400 known species belonging to the order Piperales. The type genus is Aristolochia L.

== Description ==
They are mostly perennial, herbaceous plants, shrubs, or lianas. The membranous, cordate simple leaves are spread out, growing alternately along the stem on leaf stalks. The margins are commonly entire. No stipules are present. The flowers are large to medium-sized, growing in the leaf axils. They are bilaterally or radially symmetrical.

== Classification ==
Aristolochiaceae are magnoliids, a basal group of angiosperms which are not part of the large categories of monocots or eudicots. As of APG IV (2016), the former families Hydnoraceae and Lactoridaceae are included, because exclusion would make Aristolochiaceae in the traditional sense paraphyletic.

Some newer classification schemes, such as the update of the Angiosperm Phylogeny Group, place the family Aristolochiaceae in the order Piperales, but it is still quite common, though superseded, for the Aristolochiaceae to be assigned, sometimes with some other families, their own order (Aristolochiales).

== Phylogeny ==
Eight genera are accepted – Aristolochia, Asarum, Euglypha, Hydnora, Lactoris, Prosopanche, Saruma, and Thottea.

Four assemblages can be distinguished in the genus-level cladogram of Aristolochiaceae:

- Aristolochia is closely related to Thottea.
- Hydnora is closely related to Prosopanche.
- Lactoris occupies an isolated position.
- Asarum is closely related to Saruma, and both genera display a deep-branching position in the family.

Genus-level cladogram of the Aristolochiaceae.

- Aristolochiaceae
  - Asaroideae
    - Asarum L. 1753
    - Saruma Oliver 1889
  - - Lactoridoideae
      Lactoris Philippi 1865
    - - Aristolochioideae
        - Aristolochia L. 1753
        - Thottea Rottboell 1783
      - Hydnoroideae
        - Hydnora Thunberg 1775
        - Prosopanche de Bary 1868

The phylogeny is based on the Angiosperm Phylogeny Website.

== Phytochemistry ==
Many members of Aristolochia and some of Asarum contain the toxin aristolochic acid, which discourages herbivores and is known to be carcinogenic in rats. Aristolochia species are carcinogenic to humans.

== Genomics ==
The highly reduced plastid genome map of a member of Aristolochiaceae, Hydnora visseri

The complete plastid genome sequence of one species of Aristolochiaceae, Hydnora visseri, has been determined. As compared to the chloroplast genome of its closest photosynthetic relatives, the plastome of Hydnora visseri shows extreme reduction in both size (ca. 27 kilo base pairs) and gene content (24 genes appear to be functional). This Aristolochiaceae species therefore possesses one of the smallest plastid genomes among flowering plants.

== Ecology ==
Pipevine swallowtail butterflies lay their eggs on pipevine (Aristolochia species), and the larvae feed on the plant, but are not affected by the toxin, which then offers the adult butterfly protection against predators.

== Fossil record ==
The earliest records of the family are the fossil seeds of †Aristospermum huberi and †Siratospermum mauldinense from the Early Cretaceous of Portugal and Virginia, United States. The oldest fossil leaf remains are of †Aristolochites dentata from the Late Cretaceous of Nebraska. Pollen record of †Aristolochiacidites viluiensis has been described from Upper Cretaceous sediments of Siberia. Fossil wood is known from the Deccan Traps of India some 66 million years ago. Leaf fossils of Aristolochia are known from the Early and Late Tertiary of North America and the Late Tertiary of Abkhazia, Ukrainia and Poland. Fossil leaf remains of †Aristolochia austriaca have been described from Late Miocene sediments of the Pellendorf site at the Vienna Basin in Austria. †A. austriaca is most similar to the extant Mediterranean species A. rotunda and A. baetica.
