= Carrion flower =

Flowers that smell like rotting flesh

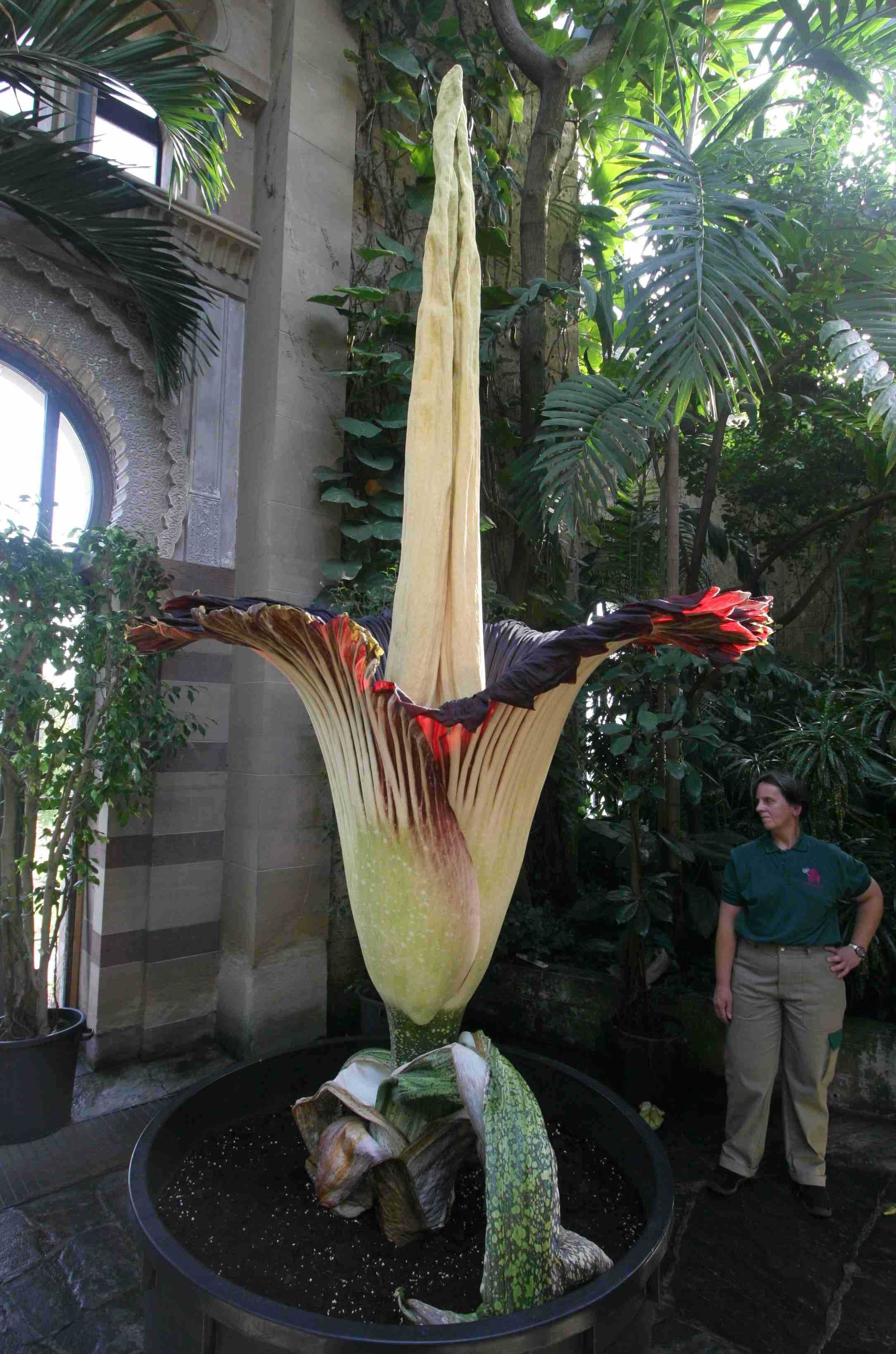
Amorphophallus titanum in Wilhelma Botanical and Zoological Gardens, Stuttgart

Carrion flowers, also known as corpse flowers or stinking flowers, are mimetic flowers that emit an odor that smells like rotting flesh. Apart from the scent, carrion flowers often display additional characteristics that contribute to the mimesis of a decaying corpse. These include their specific coloration (red, purple, brown), the presence of setae, and orifice-like flower architecture. Carrion flowers attract mostly scavenging flies and beetles as pollinators. Some species may trap the insects temporarily to ensure the gathering and transfer of pollen.

== Plants known as "carrion flower" ==
=== Amorphophallus ===
Many plants in the genus Amorphophallus (family Araceae) are known as carrion flowers. One such plant is the Titan arum (Amorphophallus titanum), which has the world's largest unbranched inflorescence. Rather than a single flower, the titan arum presents an inflorescence or compound flower composed of a spadix or stalk of small and anatomically reduced male and female flowers, surrounded by a spathe that resembles a single giant petal. This plant has a mechanism to heat up the spadix enhancing the emission of the strong odor to attract its pollinators, carrion-eating beetles and "flesh flies" (family Sarcophagidae). It was first described scientifically in 1878 in Sumatra.

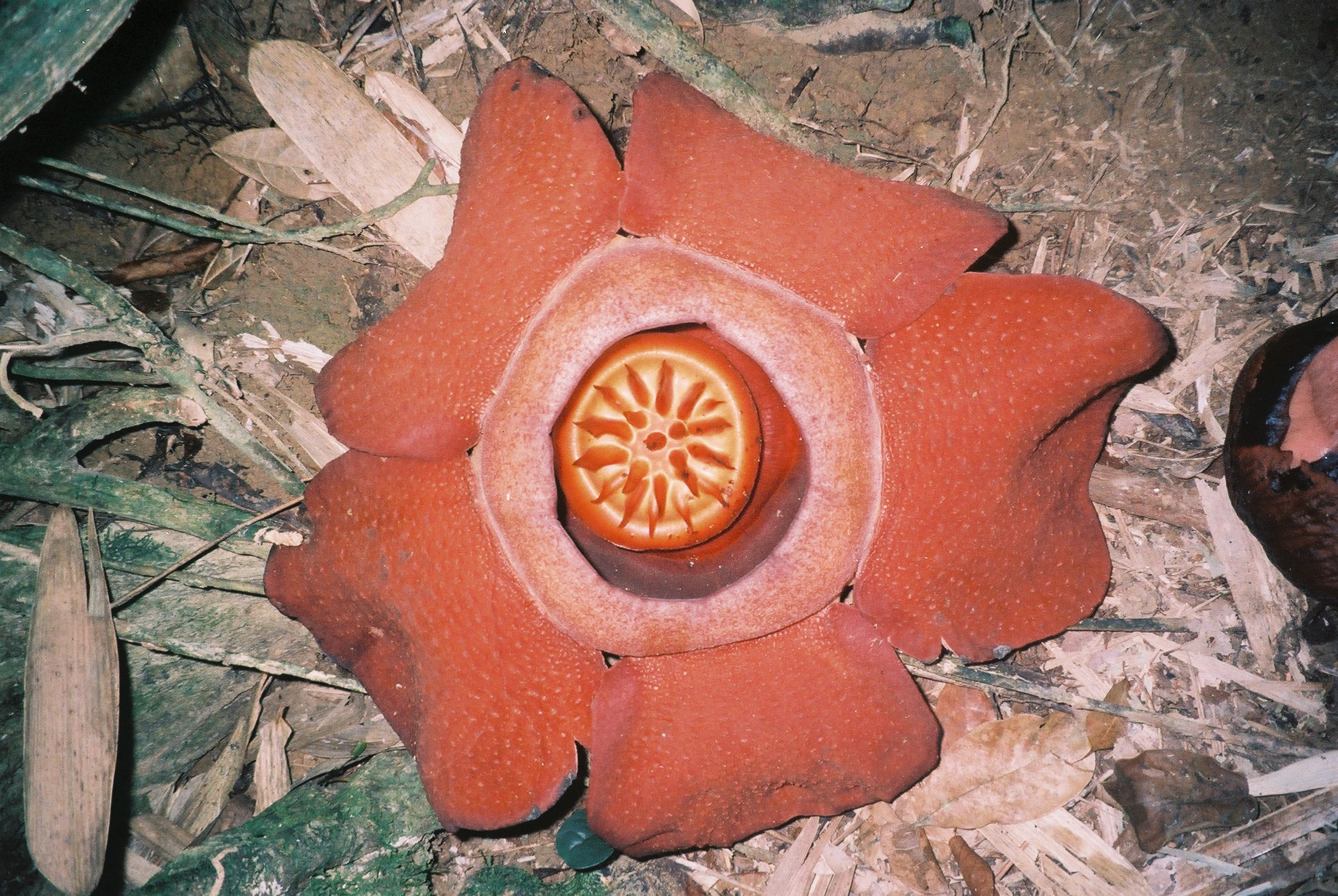
Flower of Rafflesia kerrii, in Khao Sok National Park, Southern Thailand.

=== Rafflesia ===
Flowers of plants in the genus Rafflesia (family Rafflesiaceae) emit an odor to attract the flies that pollinate the plant. The world's largest single bloom is that of R. arnoldii. This rare flower is found in the rainforests of Borneo and Sumatra. It can grow to be 90 centimetres (3 ft) across and can weigh up to 7 kilograms (15 lb). R. arnoldii is a parasitic plant on Tetrastigma vine, which grows only in primary rainforests. It has no visible leaves, roots, or stem. It does not photosynthesize, but rather uses the host plant to obtain water and nutrients.

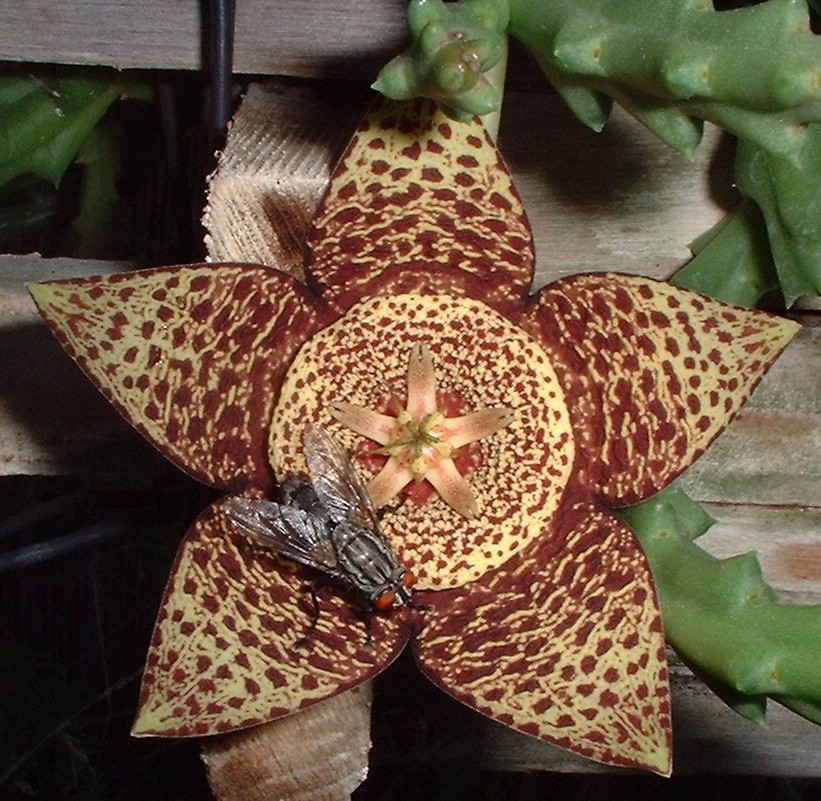
House fly landing on a flower of Orbea variegata.

=== Stapelia ===
Plants in the genus Stapelia are also called "carrion flowers". They are small, spineless, cactus-like succulent plants. Most species are native to South Africa, and are grown as potted plants elsewhere. The flowers of all species are hairy to varying degrees. The color and smell of the flowers both mimic rotting meat. This attracts scavenging flies, for pollination. The flowers in some species can be very large, notably Stapelia gigantea can reach 30 cm (12 in) in diameter.

=== Smilax or Nemexia ===
In North America, the herbaceous vines of the genus Smilax are known as carrion flowers. These plants have a cluster of small greenish flowers. The most familiar member of this groups is Smilax herbacea. These plants are sometimes placed in the genus Nemexia The plant's profound rarity and unique characteristics made it difficult to preserve the plant in the initial period following its discovery by Elaine Ayers. The outcome of these difficulties eventually led a story of loss that symbolized specimens that were destroyed, missing, and displayed as pieces.

=== Bulbophyllum (Orchid) ===
Orchids of the genus Bulbophyllum produce strongly scented flowers. The flowers produce various odors resembling sap, urine, blood, dung, carrion, and, in some species, fragrant fruity aromas. Most are fly-pollinated, and attract hordes of flies. Bulbophyllum beccarii, Bulbophyllum fletcherianum and Bulbophyllum phalaenopsis in bloom have been likened to smelling like a herd of dead elephants. Their overpowering floral odors are sometimes described as making it difficult to walk into a greenhouse in which they are in bloom.

== Scent ==
The sources of the flowers' unique scent are not fully identified, partly due to the extremely low concentration of the compounds (5 to 10 parts per billion). Biochemical tests on Amorphophallus species revealed foul-smelling dimethyl sulfides such as dimethyl disulfide and dimethyl trisulfide, and in other species, trace amounts of amines such as putrescine and cadaverine have been found. Methyl thioacetate (which has a cheesy, garlic-like odor) and isovaleric acid (smells of sweat) also contribute to the smell of the flower. Trimethylamine is the cause of the "rotten fish smell" towards the end of the flower's life.

== Pollination ==
Both visual interactions and odor are important attractants for pollinators. In order for pollination to occur, a relationship of attraction and reward must be present between the flower and the pollinator. The pollinator's body mechanically promotes pollen adherence, which is necessary for effective pollen dispersal. The recognizable scent of the carrion flowers is produced in the petals of both male and female flowers and the pollen reward attracts beetles and flies. Popular pollinators of carrion flowers are blowflies (Calliphoridae), house flies (Muscidae), flesh flies (Sarcophagidae) and varying types of beetles, due to the scents produced by the plant. Fly pollinators are typically attracted to pale, dull plants or those with translucent patches. Additionally, these plants produce pollen, do not have present nectar guides and flowers resemble a funnel or complex trap. The host plant can sometimes trap the pollinator during the pollination/feeding process.

== Other plants with carrion-scented flowers ==
Annonaceae

- Asimina, commonly referred to as "pawpaw"
- Sapranthus palanga

Apocynaceae

- subtribe Stapeliinae: Boucerosia frerei, Caralluma, Duvalia, Echidnopsis, Edithcolea grandis, Hoodia, Huernia, Orbea, Piaranthus, Pseudolithos

Araceae

- Arum dioscoridis, A. maculatum
- Dracunculus vulgaris
- Helicodiceros muscivorus
- Lysichiton americanum
- Symplocarpus foetidus

Aristolochiaceae

- Aristolochia californica, A. grandiflora, A. microstoma, A. salvadorensis, A. littoralis
- Hydnora

Asparagaceae

- Eucomis bicolor

Balanophoraceae

- Sarcophyte sanguinea subsp. sanguinea

Bignoniaceae

- Crescentia alata

Burmanniaceae

- Tiputinia foetida

Cytinaceae

- Bdallophytum

Dioscoreaceae

- Tacca integrifolia

Iridaceae

- Moraea lurida
- Ferraria crispa

Malvaceae

- Sterculia foetida

Melanthiaceae

- Trillium erectum, T. foetidissimum, T. sessile, T. stamineum

Orchidaceae

- Satyrium pumilum
- Masdevallia elephanticeps, M. angulata, M. colossus, M. picea

== See also ==
- Stinkhorn — fungi that use the same basic principle for spore dispersal
- Aseroe rubra — fungi that use the same basic principle for spore dispersal
