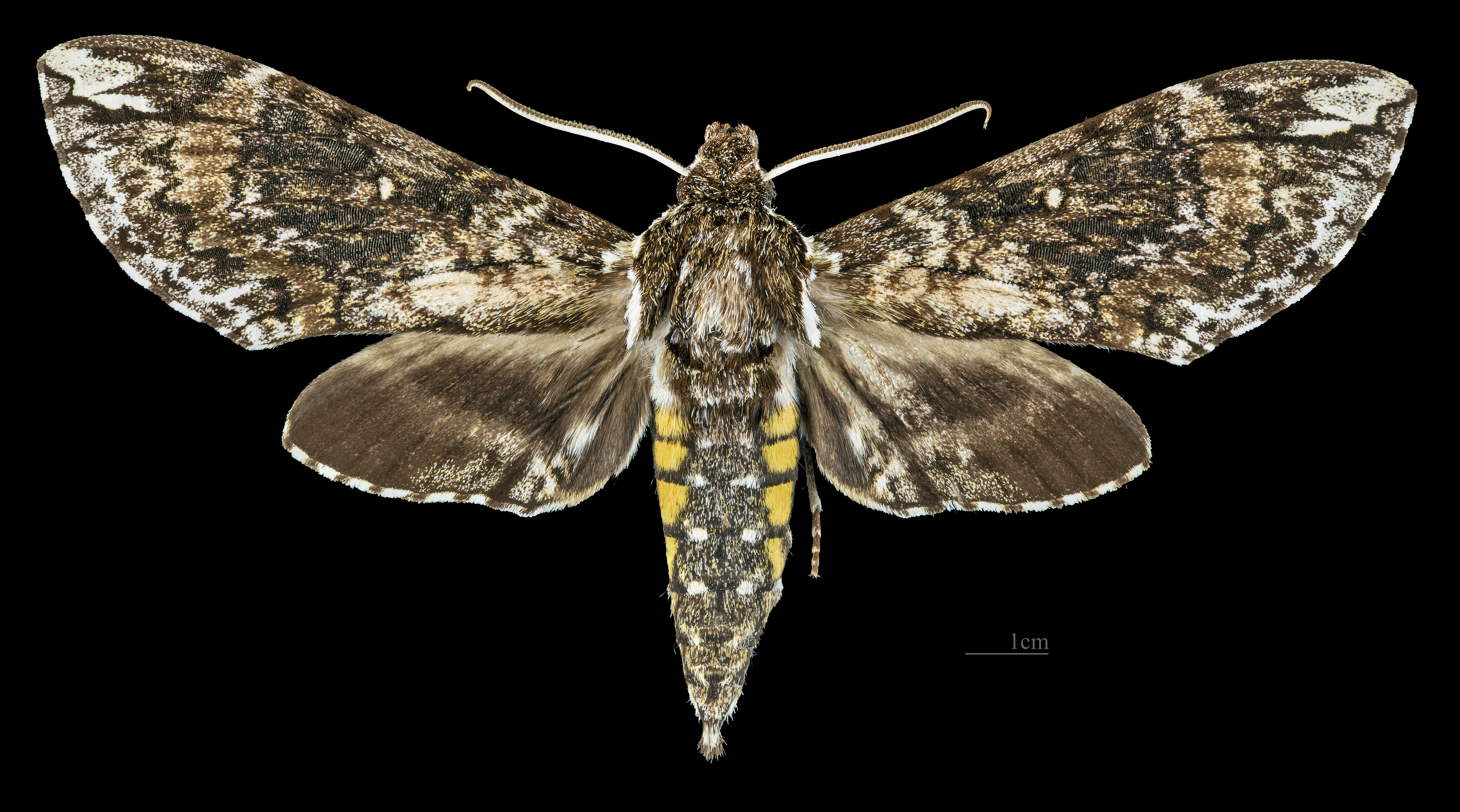
- Male dorsal
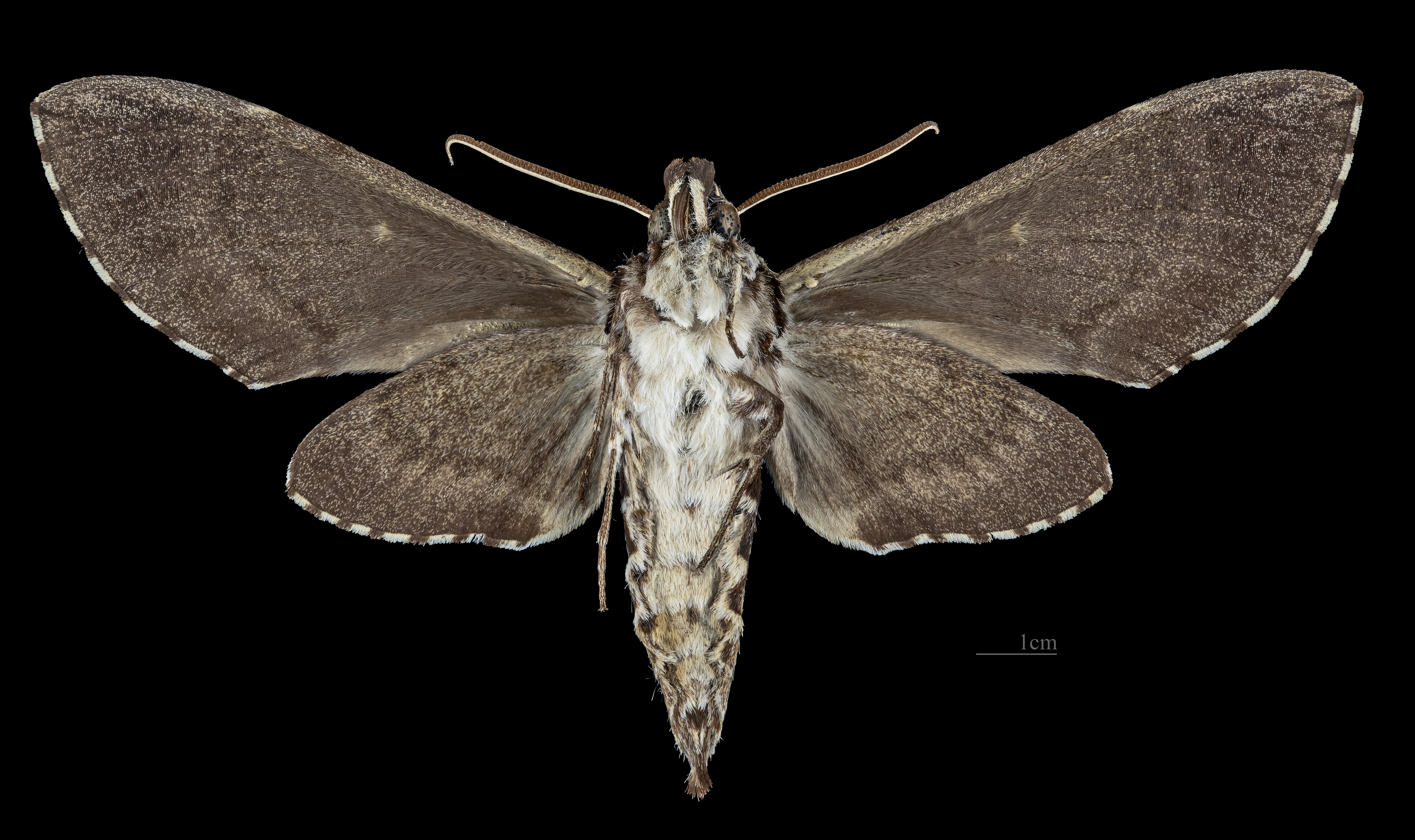
- Male ventral

Scientific classification
- Kingdom: Animalia
- Phylum: Arthropoda
- Class: Insecta
- Order: Lepidoptera
- Family: Sphingidae
- Genus: Manduca
- Species: M. dilucida

Binomial name
- Manduca dilucida (W. H. Edwards, 1887)

Synonyms
- Protoparce dilucida W.H. Edwards, 1887; Phlegethontius indistincta Rothschild, 1894

= Manduca dilucida =

Species of moth

Manduca dilucida is a moth of the family Sphingidae first described by William Henry Edwards in 1887.

== Distribution ==
It is found from Mexico to Belize, Nicaragua and Costa Rica and possibly across northern South America to Venezuela.

== Description ==
The wingspan is 95–98 mm.

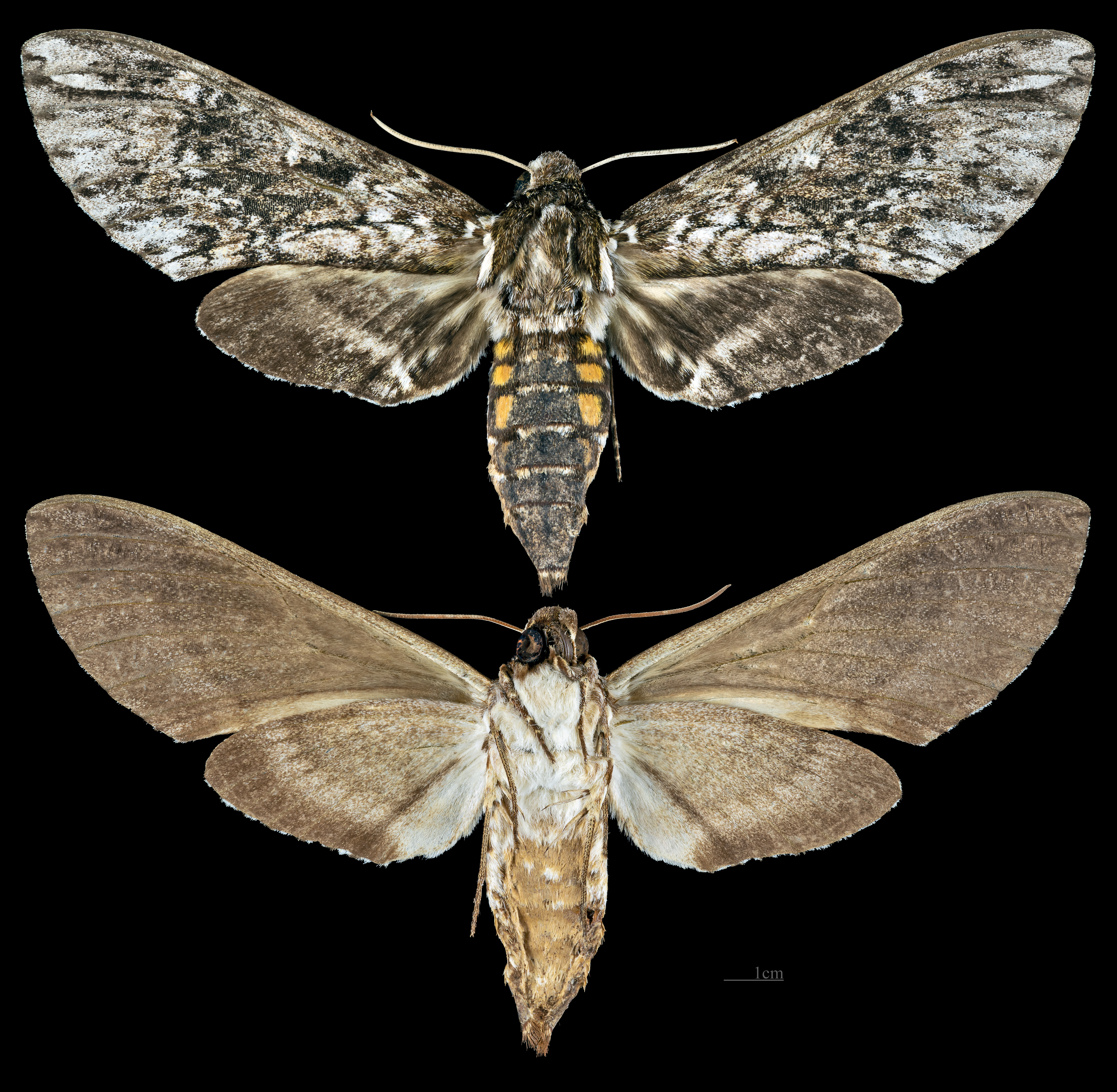
Female dorsal view

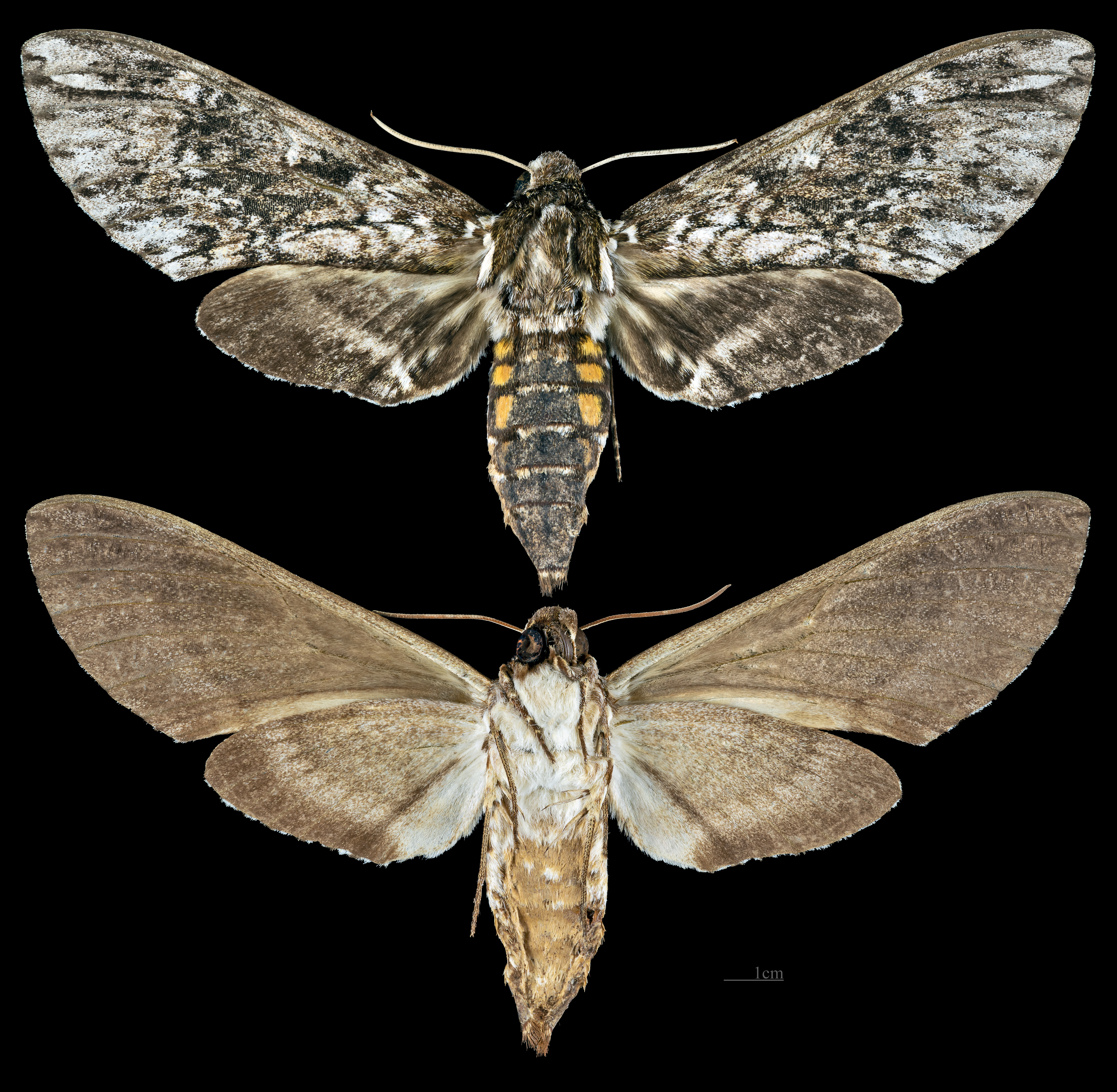
Female ventral view

== Biology ==
Adults have been recorded in February and from April to October in Costa Rica. There are probably three generations per year.

The larvae feed on Annona reticulata, Annona holosericea, Sapranthus palanga, Amphilophilum paniculatum, Crescentia alata, Tabebuia ochracea, Cordia alliodora and Cornutia grandifolia.
