= Carrion plant =

Carrion plant is a common name for several plants with foul smelling flowers and may refer to:

- Stapelia grandiflora, native to South Africa
- Stapelia gigantea

== See also ==
- Carrion flower
