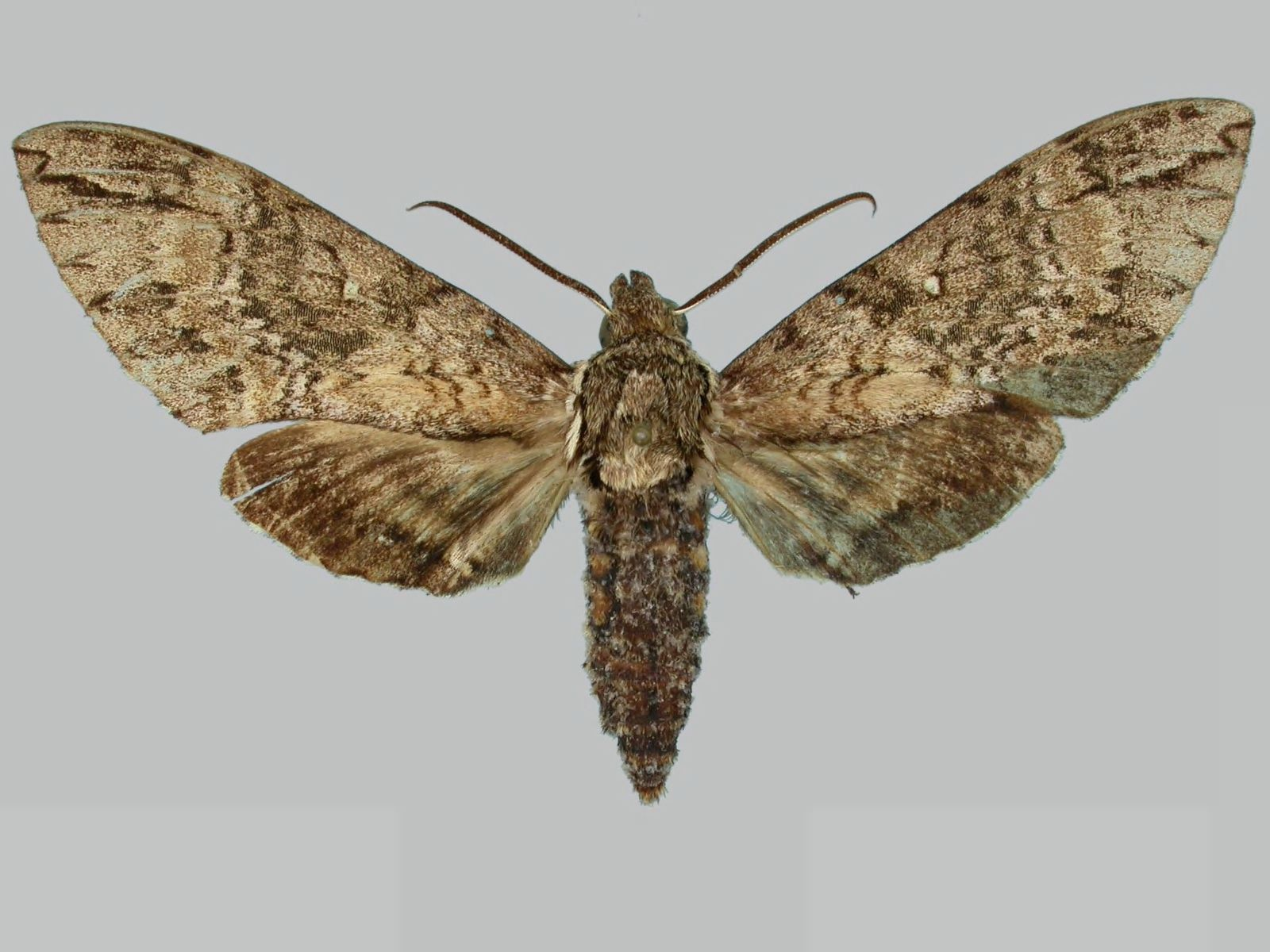
- Male

Scientific classification
- Kingdom: Animalia
- Phylum: Arthropoda
- Class: Insecta
- Order: Lepidoptera
- Family: Sphingidae
- Genus: Manduca
- Species: M. kuschei

Binomial name
- Manduca kuschei (Clark, 1920)

Synonyms
- Protoparce kuschei Clark, 1920

= Manduca kuschei =

Species of moth

Manduca kuschei is a moth of the family Sphingidae. It is known from Mexico.

The length of the forewings is 39 mm for males and 46 mm for females. It is extremely similar to Manduca dilucida and males can only be distinguished by a study of the genitalia. Females are also similar, but are separable by the pattern on their wings. Furthermore, the forewing upperside is more uniform in colour and the ground colour is grey with darker grey and black markings. The forewing and hindwing undersides are grey and the hindwing upperside is grey with darker grey and black markings.
