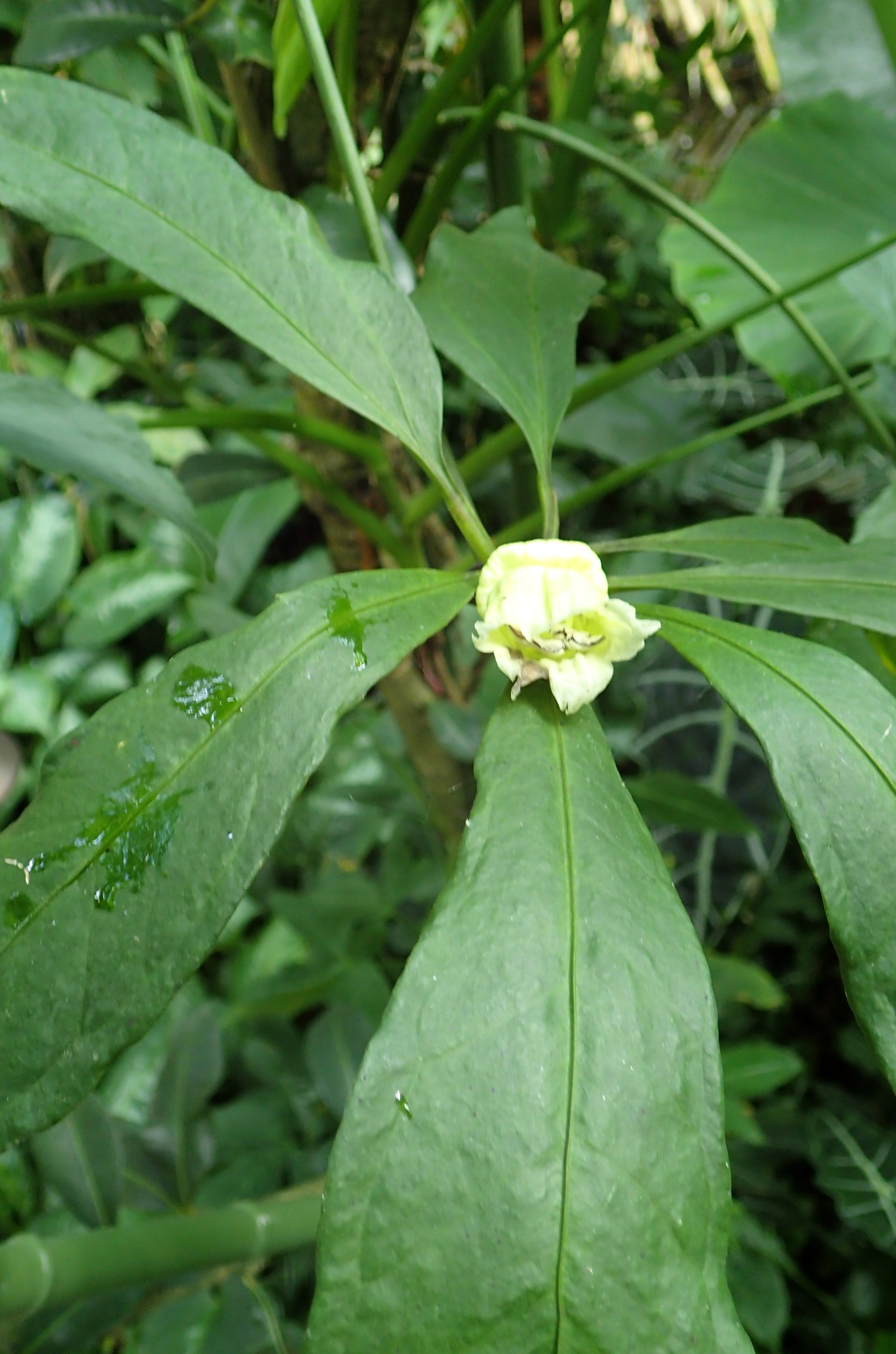

Conservation status
- Critically Endangered (IUCN 3.1)

- Endangered (ESA)

Scientific classification
- Kingdom: Plantae
- Clade: Tracheophytes
- Clade: Angiosperms
- Clade: Eudicots
- Clade: Asterids
- Order: Lamiales
- Family: Bignoniaceae
- Genus: Crescentia
- Species: C. portoricensis

Binomial name
- Crescentia portoricensis Britton

= Crescentia portoricensis =

Calabach

Species of plant

Crescentia portoricensis, commonly known as Higüero De Sierra in Spanish or Calabach in English, is a species of plant in the family Bignoniaceae. It is a perennial evergreen shrub endemic to Puerto Rico. It is threatened by habitat loss. C. portoricensis can grow up to 6 metres (20 ft) and produces a yellowish-white bell shaped flower that ripens into dark green fruits.

== Habitat ==
Crescentia portoricensis can be found near stream banks or near highly moist soil in the southwestern wet forest areas of Puerto Rico.
