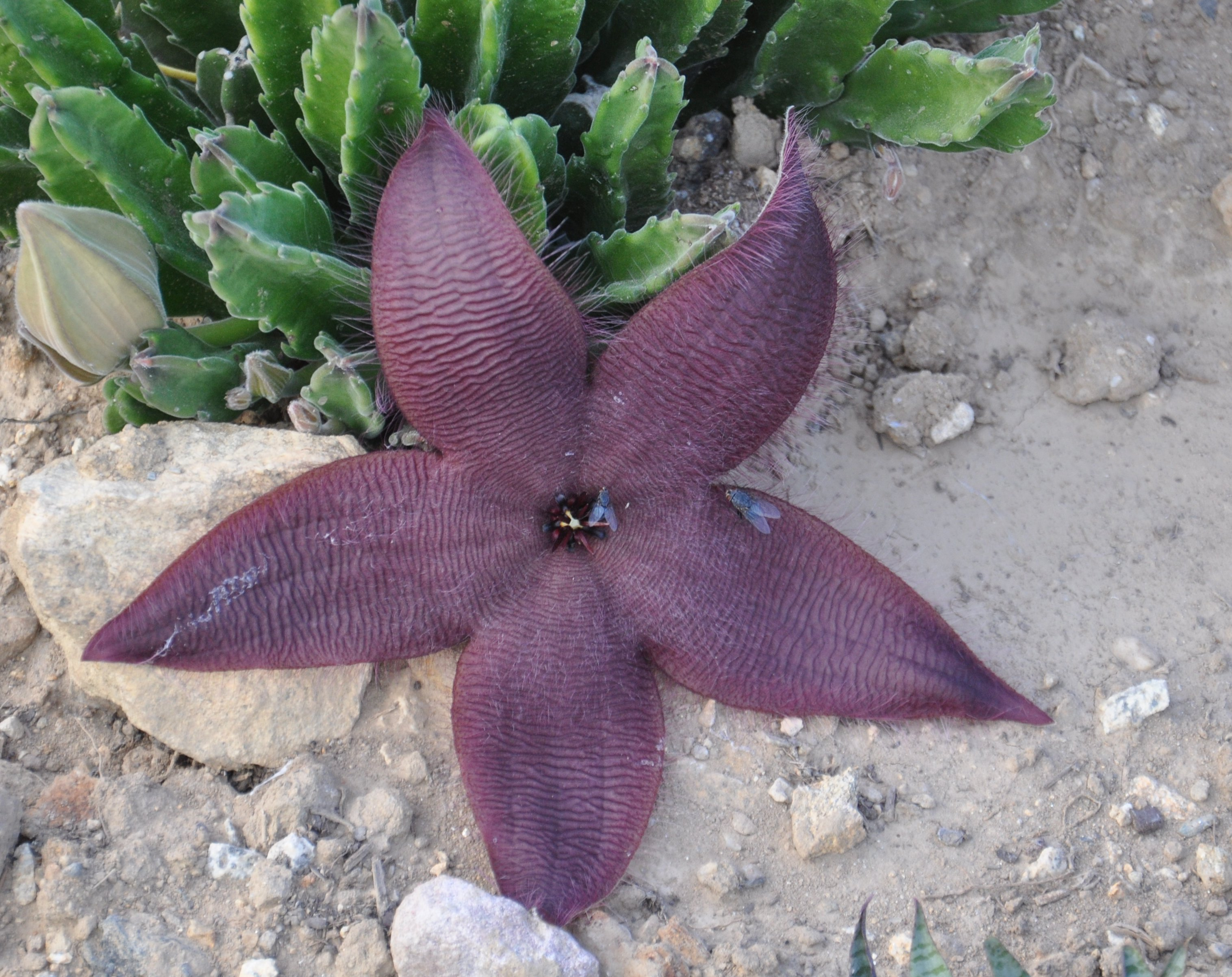

Scientific classification
- Kingdom: Plantae
- Clade: Tracheophytes
- Clade: Angiosperms
- Clade: Eudicots
- Clade: Asterids
- Order: Gentianales
- Family: Apocynaceae
- Genus: Stapelia
- Species: S. grandiflora

Binomial name
- Stapelia grandiflora Masson

Synonyms
- Stisseria grandiflora (Masson) Kuntze; Gonostemon grandiflorus (Masson) P.V.Heath; Ceropegia grandiflora (Masson) Bruyns; Stapelia flavirostris N.E.Br.

= Stapelia grandiflora =

Species of plant

Stapelia grandiflora is a species of flowering plant in the genus Stapelia of the family Apocynaceae. It is commonly referred to as the carrion plant, starfish flower, giant toad plant, or starfish cactus, although it is not related to cacti at all. This "carrion plant" nickname can also refer to similar Stapelia species as well as members of related genera, including Stapelia gigantea and Orbea variegata. Stapelia grandiflora sometimes also goes by the name of Stapelia flavirostris. The plant is native to South Africa, including the Northern Cape, Eastern Cape, and Free State.

== Description ==
This plant is a very variable species, with many hybrids. The stems can be either erect or ascending 9-10 (-30) cm long and up to 3 cm in diameter (usually less than 2 cm). The flowers are velvety and smaller in size than those of Stapelia gigantea, they come in various shapes and colors. Flowers are intermittently produced in the late summer and fall seasons.

The name "carrion plant" is due to the odor emitted by the flowers as a technique of attracting flies in areas where other pollinating insects are scarce.

== Gallery ==
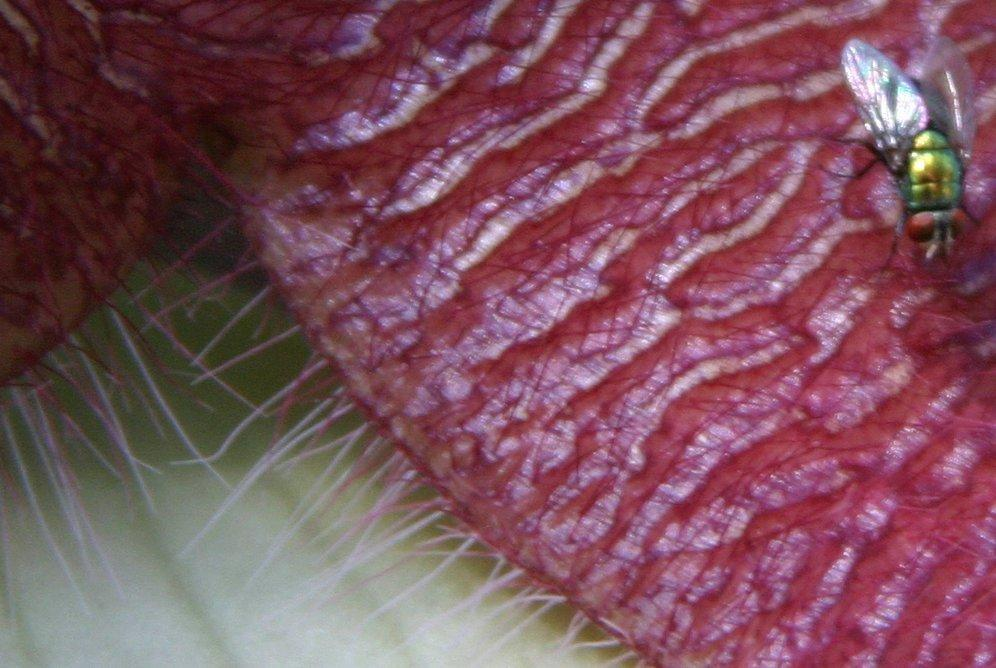
A blowfly sitting on a Stapelia Flower, attracted to the smell.

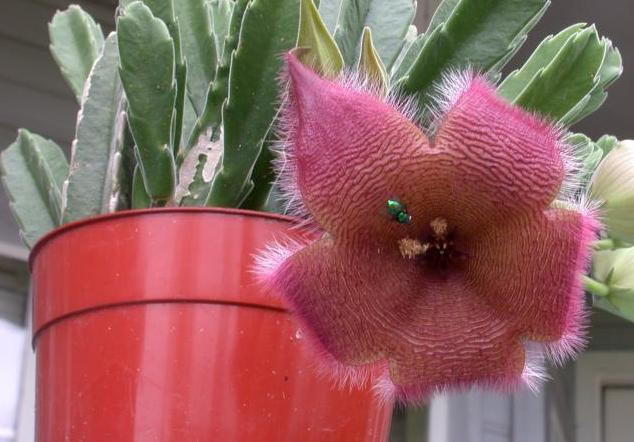
A potted specimen

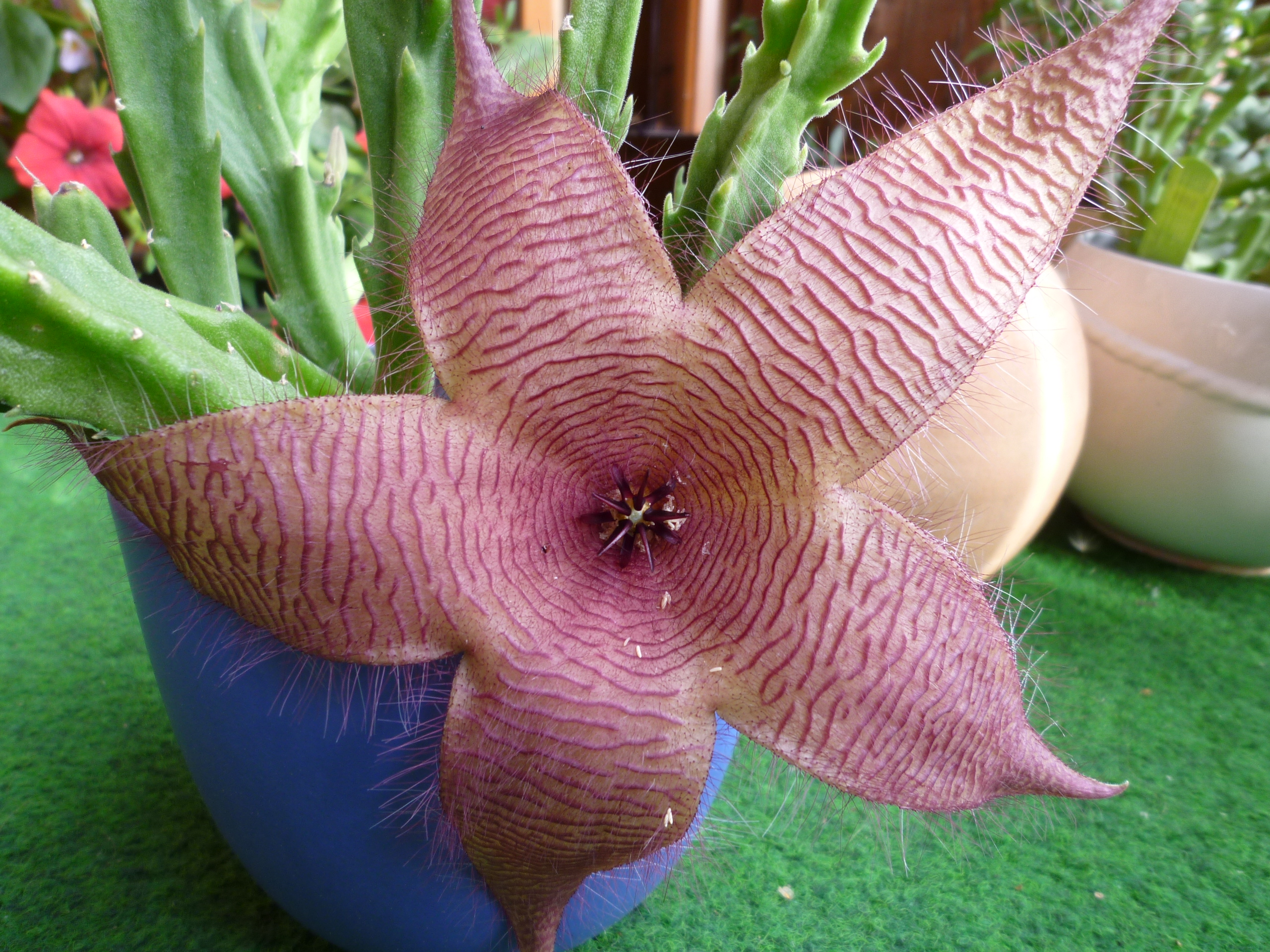
Blossom of the carrion plant.

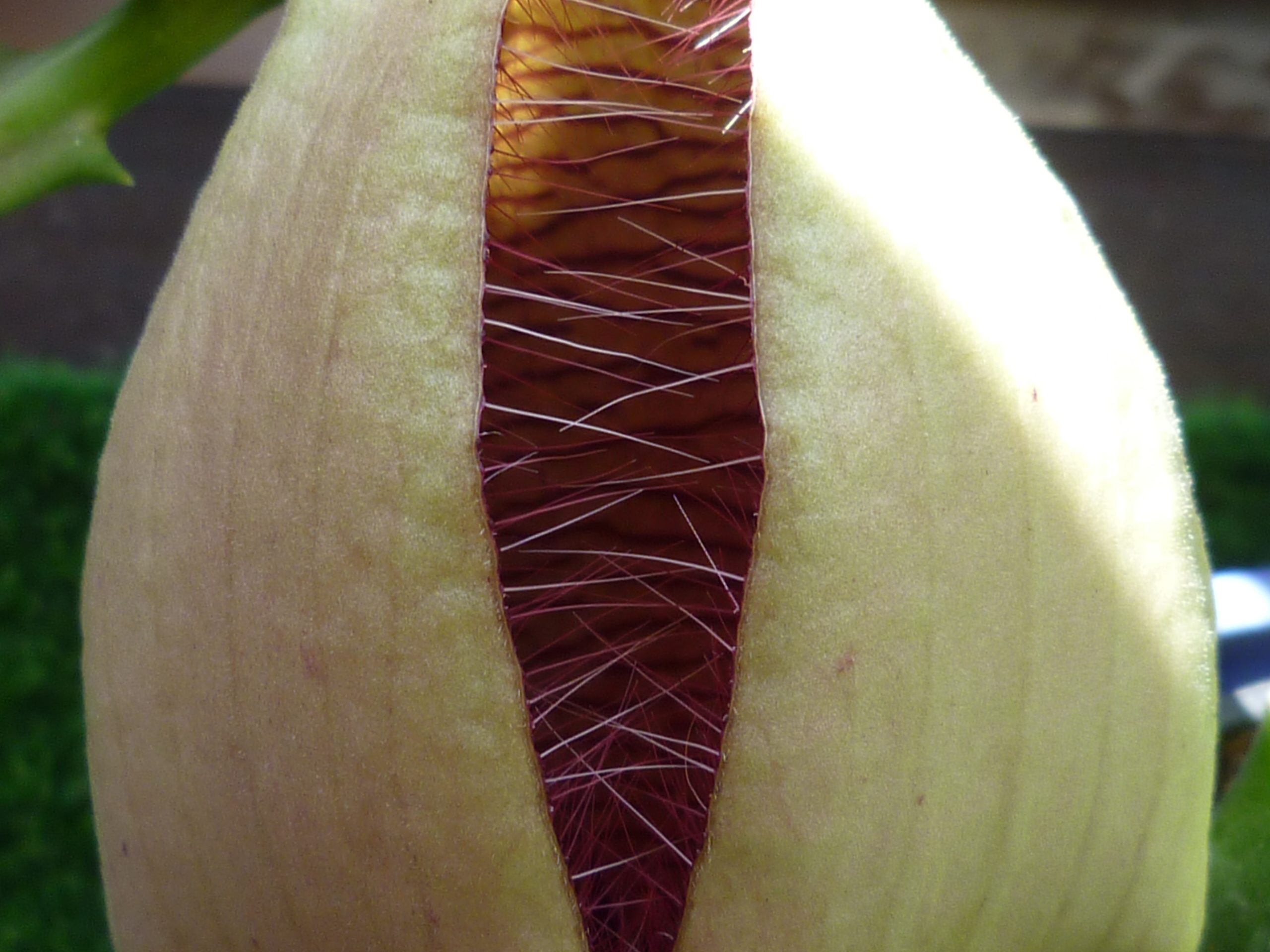
Carrion plant slowly opening.

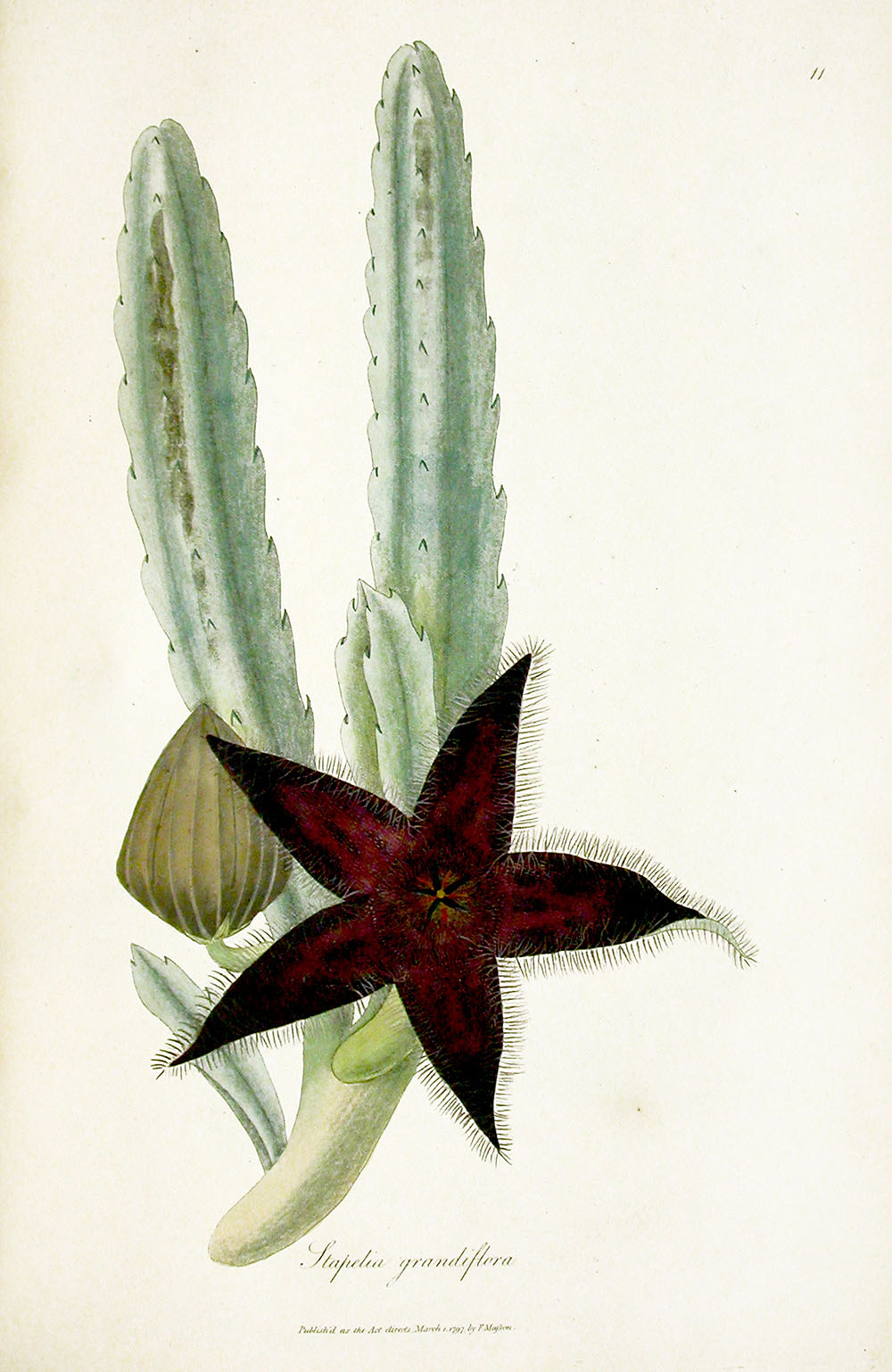
Illustration of the flower by Francis Masson, 1796.
