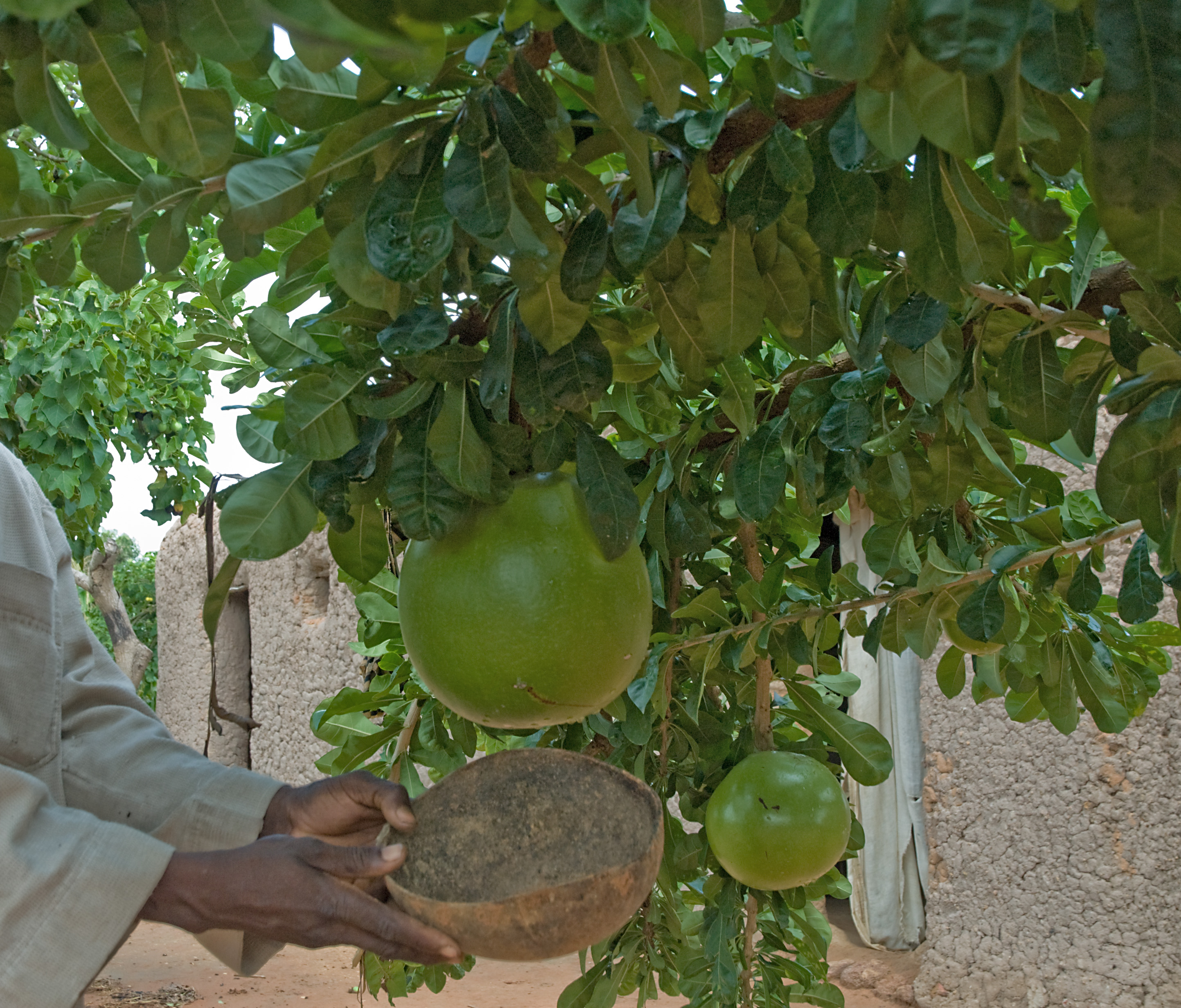
- Fruiting branches, and showing bowl made of the hard rind of a fruit of that tree (Koutiala District, Mali, September 2014)

Conservation status
- Least Concern (IUCN 3.1)

- Apparently Secure (NatureServe)

Scientific classification
- Kingdom: Plantae
- Clade: Tracheophytes
- Clade: Angiosperms
- Clade: Eudicots
- Clade: Asterids
- Order: Lamiales
- Family: Bignoniaceae
- Genus: Crescentia
- Species: C. cujete

Binomial name
- Crescentia cujete L.

= Crescentia cujete =

Species of plant

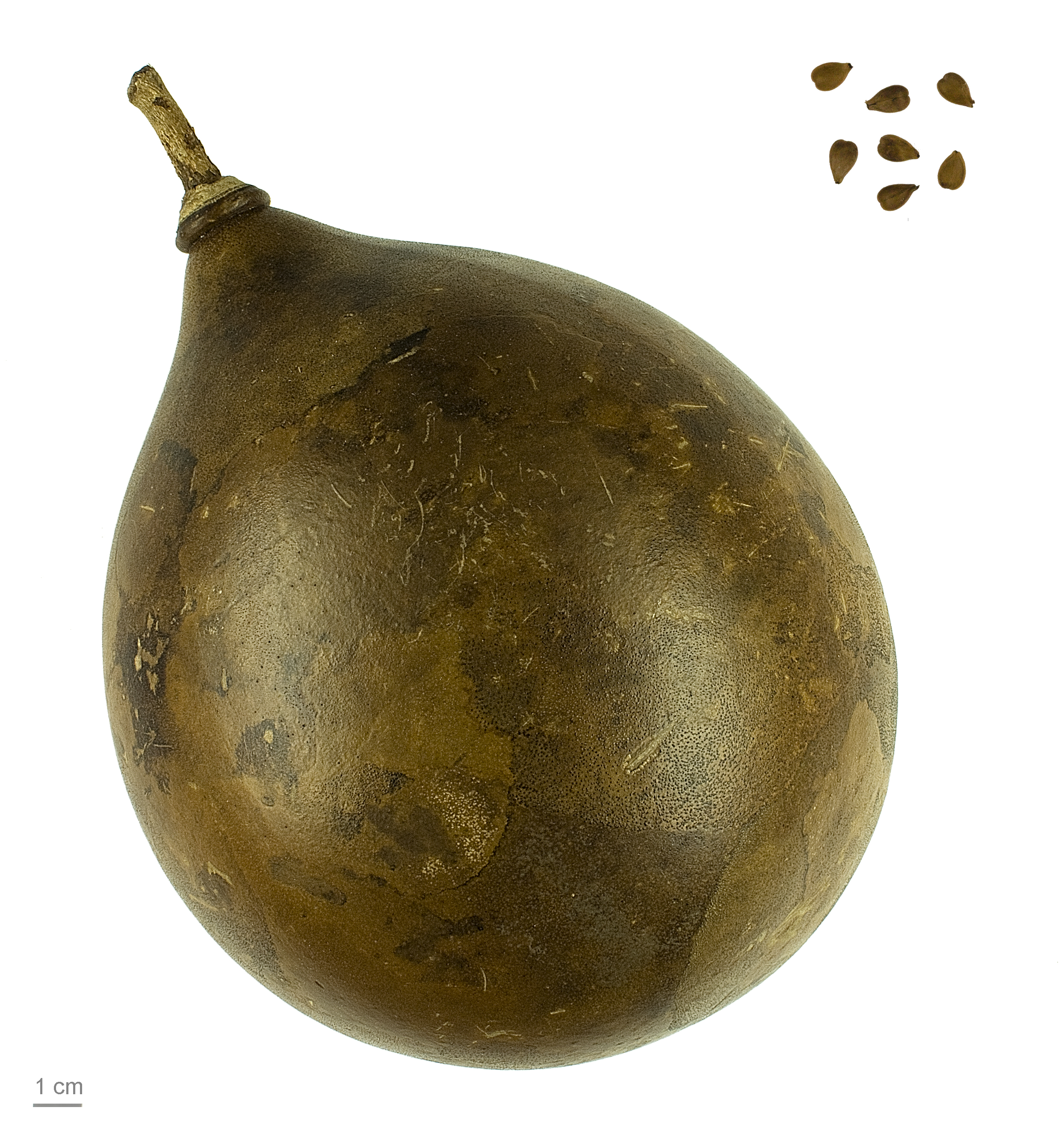
Crescentia cujete, dry fruit and seeds – MHNT

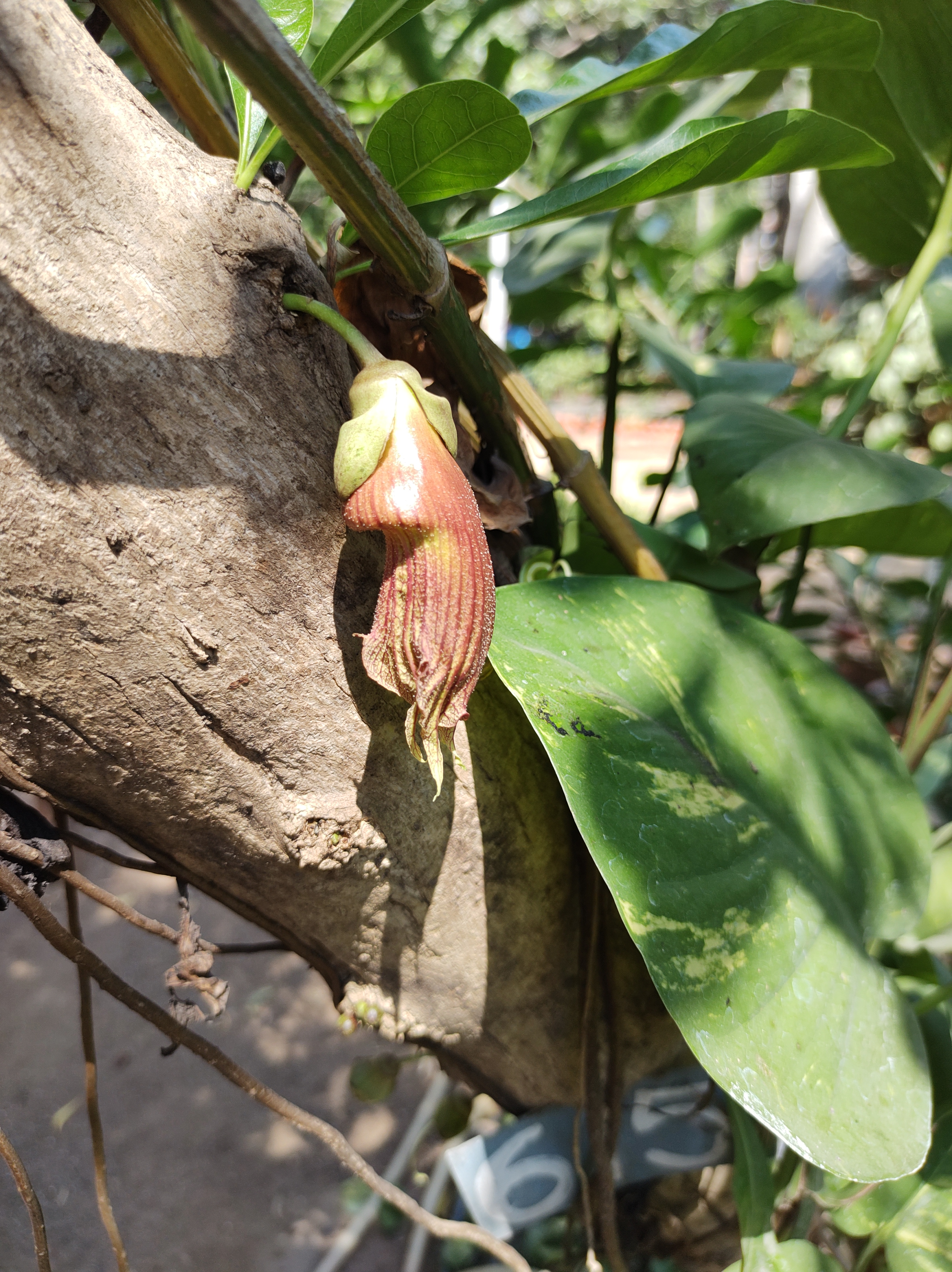
Flower

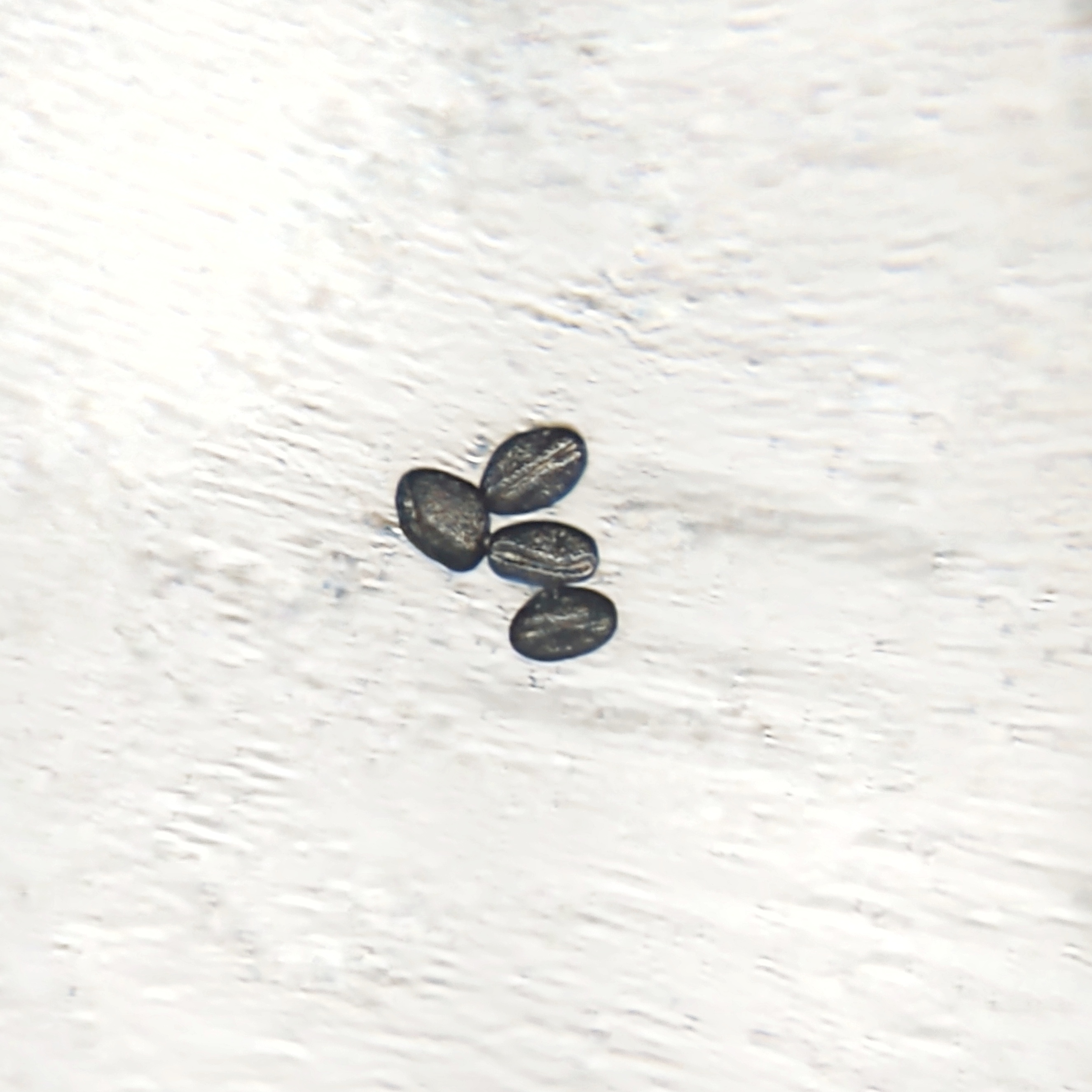
Seeds

Crescentia cujete, commonly known as the calabash tree, is a species of flowering plant. It is a medium-sized tree in the trumpet vine family Bignoniaceae native to the Americas, and which is grown in Africa, Southeast Asia, Central America, South America, the West Indies and extreme southern Florida. It is the national tree of St. Lucia. It is a dicotyledonous plant with simple leaves, which are alternate or in fascicles (clusters) on short shoots. Its fruit is up to 30 cm (12 in) long by 25 cm (9.8 in) wide. According to Bailey, it can occasionally be 45–50 cm (18–20 in) wide. It is naturalized in India. The tree shares its common name with that of the vine calabash, or bottle gourd (Lagenaria siceraria).

In Cuba, this tree is known to grow in both disturbed habitat and areas of poor drainage. It can grow up to 10 m (33 ft) tall.

== Uses ==
=== Caribbean ===
The fruit is primarily used to make utensils, such as cups, bowls, and basins, in rural areas. It can be used for carrying water, or for transporting fish, when fishing. In some Caribbean countries, it is worked, painted, and decorated and turned into items by artisans, and sold to tourists.

As a cup, bowl, or even a water-pipe or "bong", the calabash is considered consistent with the "Ital" or vital lifestyle of not using refined products such as table salt, or modern cooking methods, such as microwave ovens. In Haiti, the plant is called kalbas kouran, literally, "running calabash", and is used to make the sacred rattle emblematic of the Vodou priesthood, called an ason. As such, the plant is highly respected. It is the national tree of St. Lucia. In Cuba, the dried fruit is commonly used as a coffee cup by rural farmers. In Dominican Republic, the plant is called the higüero tree and it is popularly used to make decorative objects and ornaments, though historically it has been used in all sorts of ways.

=== Costa Rica ===
The Costa Rican town of Santa Bárbara de Santa Cruz holds a traditional annual dance of the calabashes (baile de los guacales). Since 2000, the activity has been considered of cultural interest to the community, and all participants receive a hand-painted calabash vessel to thank them for their economic contribution (which they paid in the form of an entrance ticket).

Native Americans throughout the country traditionally serve chicha in calabash vessels to the participants of special events such as the baile de los diablitos (dance of the little devils).

=== Mexico ===
In many rural parts of Mexico, the calabash is dried and carved hollow to create a bule or a guaje, a gourd used to carry water around like a canteen. The jícara fruit is cut in half, which gave the parallel name to a clay cup also called jícara. These jícaras can also be used for serving or drinking.

=== Brazil ===
Bowls made of calabash were used by Brazilians as utensils made to serve food, and the practice is still retained in some remote areas of Brazil (originally by populations of various ethnicities, origins and regions, but nowadays mainly by Native Americans). The fruit are also commonly used in Brazil as the resonator for the berimbau, the signature instrument of capoeira, a martial art/dance developed in Brazilian plantations by enslaved Africans.

=== Colombia ===
In Colombia, the dried fruit is halved and then partially filled with either stones, beads, seeds, broken glass or a combination and is then used to keep the rhythm in bullerengue music. The dried fruit are filled with certain seeds and a handle is made to make maracas in multiple Latin American countries (especially Colombia and Cuba).

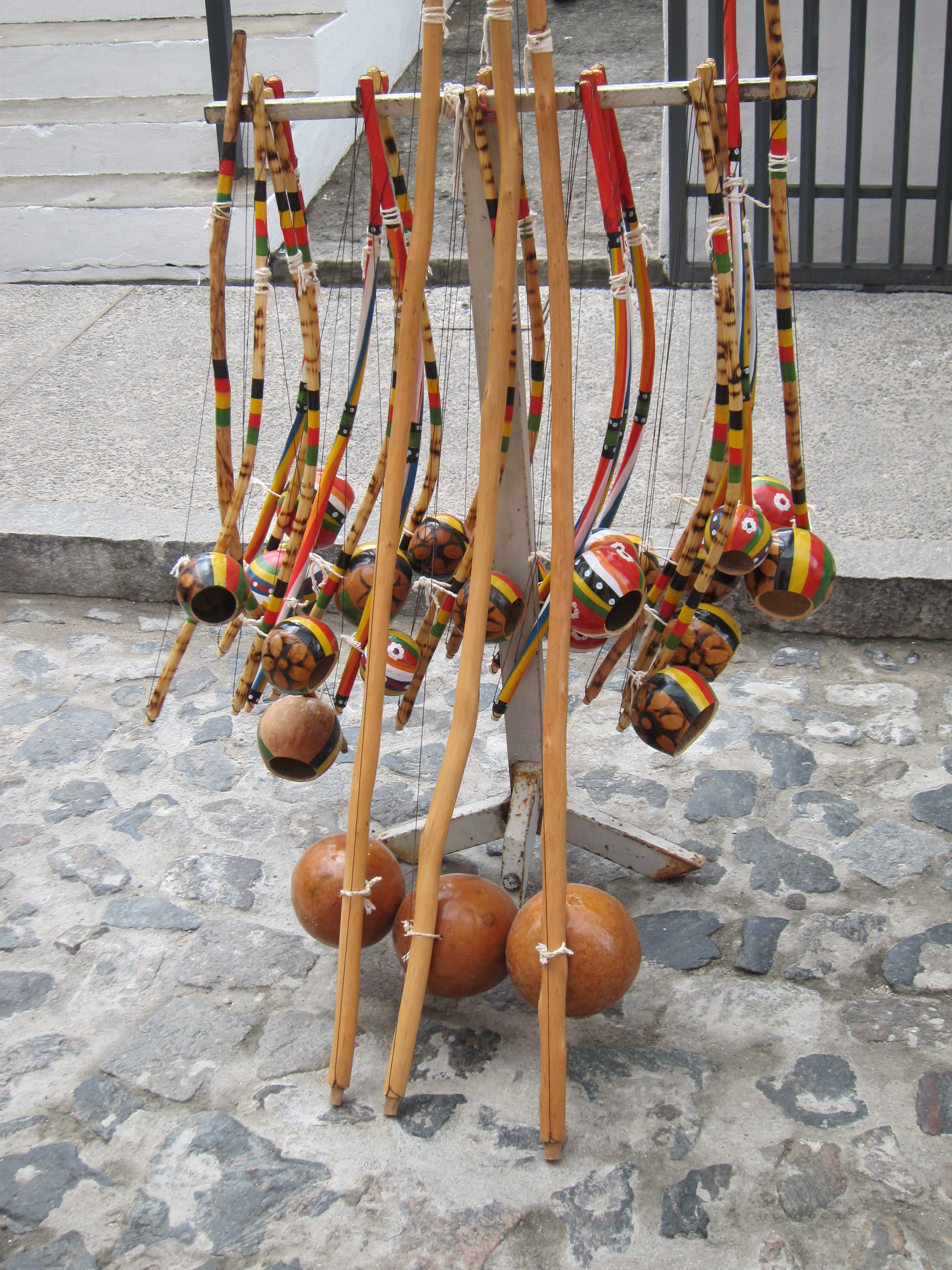
Berimbau, musical instrument in Brazil: The fruit functions as a resonator.

=== Africa ===
In Western and Southern Africa it is also used for decoration and musical instruments. Calabash bowls are also widely used for gold panning.
