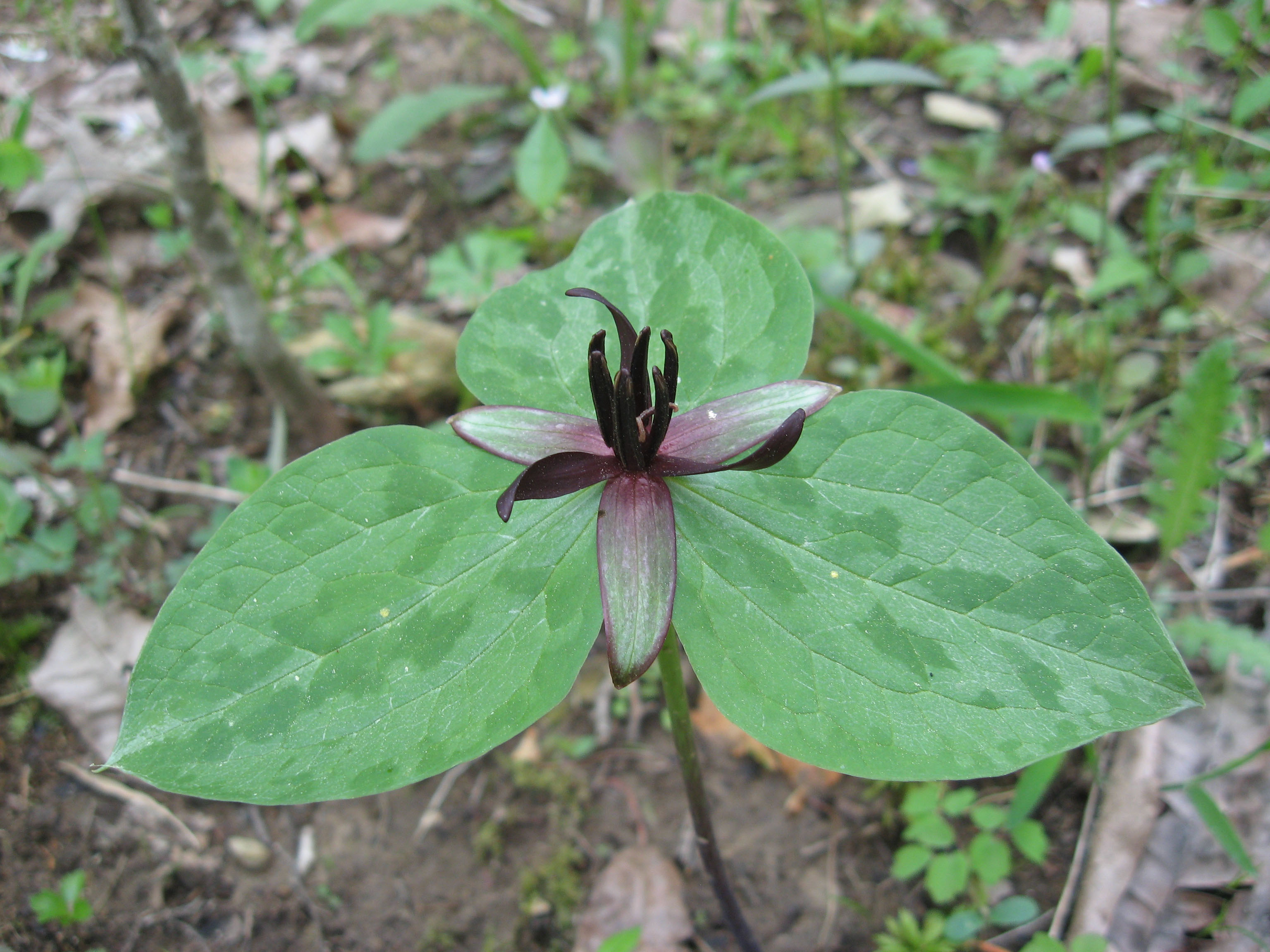
- flower and foliage

Conservation status
- Apparently Secure (NatureServe)

Scientific classification
- Kingdom: Plantae
- Clade: Tracheophytes
- Clade: Angiosperms
- Clade: Monocots
- Order: Liliales
- Family: Melanthiaceae
- Genus: Trillium
- Species: T. stamineum

Binomial name
- Trillium stamineum Harb.

Synonyms
- Trillium stamineum f. luteum J.D.Freeman

= Trillium stamineum =

Species of flowering plant

Trillium stamineum, the twisted trillium, also known as the Blue Ridge wakerobin, is a species of flowering plant in the family Melanthiaceae. It is native to the southeastern United States, in Alabama, Mississippi and Tennessee. Its natural habitat is calcareous woodlands.

== Description ==
Trillium stamineum is a perennial herbaceous plant that spreads by means of underground rhizomes. The plant has three sessile bracts (leaves) arranged in a whorl about a pubescent scape (stem) that rises directly from the rhizome 15 to 30 cm (5.9 to 11.8 in) high. The ovate leaves, 6.3 to 7.6 cm (2.5 to 3.0 in) long by 3.3 to 5 cm (1.3 to 2.0 in) wide, are bluish-green with strong mottling that fades with age.

T. stamineum flowers between March and May, depending on latitude. A solitary flower is carried directly on the leaves. Unlike other sessile-flowered trilliums, the petals spread horizontally (instead of vertically) exposing stiffly erect stamens 16 to 24 mm (0.6 to 0.9 in) long. The dark maroon petals, 1.5 to 2.8 cm (0.6 to 1.1 in) long by 0.3 to 0.6 cm (0.1 to 0.2 in) wide, have a distinctive twist along their major axis. The carrion-scented flower of this species attracts scavenging flies and other insects for pollination.

All flower parts (stamens, filaments, anthers, ovary, stigmas) are purple or dark purple. Even the fruit is purple. In 1975, Freeman described a form that is devoid of purple pigment, which he called Trillium stamineum f. luteum. That name is now regarded as a synonym.

In 1901, Harbison compared Trillium stamineum to Trillium sessile. The former is distinguished by its pubescent stem, unusual petals, long erect stamens, and very short filaments.

== Taxonomy ==
Trillium stamineum was named and described by the American botanist Thomas Grant Harbison in 1901.

== Bibliography ==
- Case, Frederick W.; Case, Roberta B. (1997). Trilliums. Portland, Oregon: Timber Press. pp. 232–235. ISBN 978-0-88192-374-2.
- Freeman, J. D. (1975). "Revision of Trillium subgenus Phyllantherum (Liliaceae)". Brittonia. 27 (1): 1–62. Bibcode:1975Britt..27....1F. doi:10.2307/2805646. JSTOR 2805646. S2CID 20824379.
- Harbison, Thomas G. (1901). "New or little known species of Trillium". Biltmore Botanical Studies. 1 (1): 19–24.
- Shaver, Jesse M. (July 1957). "Some notes on Trillium stamineum Harbison in Tennessee" (PDF). J. Of Tenn. Academy of Science. 32 (3): 169–184.
