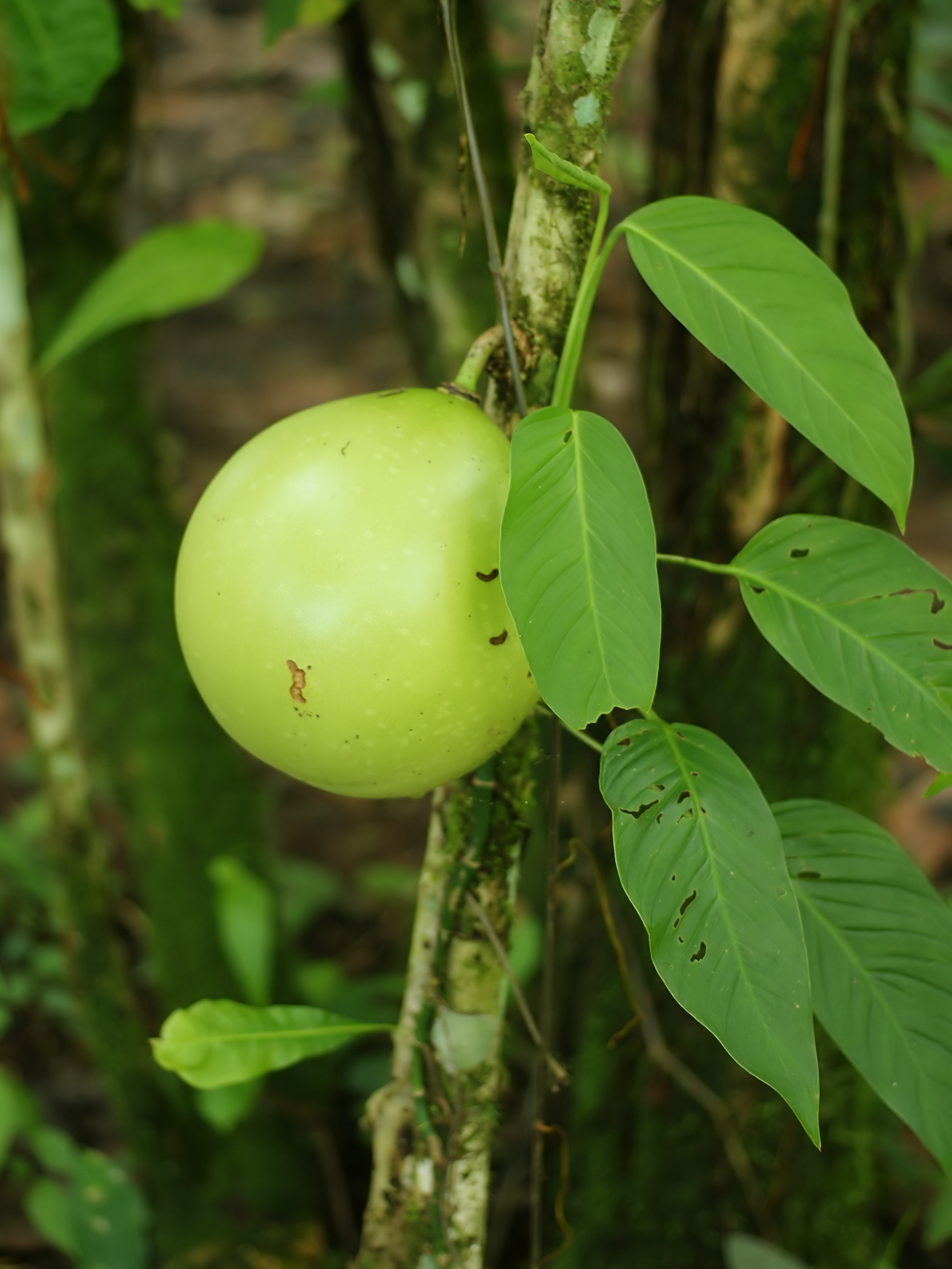
- Crescentia cujete

Scientific classification
- Kingdom: Plantae
- Clade: Tracheophytes
- Clade: Angiosperms
- Clade: Eudicots
- Clade: Asterids
- Order: Lamiales
- Family: Bignoniaceae
- Clade: Crescentiina
- Clade: Tabebuia alliance
- Tribe: Crescentieae
- Genus: Crescentia; L. (1753)

Species
- six; see text

Synonyms
- Cuiete Mill. (1754); Daubentona Buc'hoz (1783); Pteromischus Pichon (1945 publ. 1946)

= Crescentia =

Genus of trees

Crescentia (calabash tree, huingo, krabasi, or kalebas) is a genus of six species of flowering plants in the family Bignoniaceae, native to Mexico, the Caribbean, Central America, and northern South America. The species are moderate-size trees growing to 10 m (35 ft) tall, and producing large spherical fruits, with a thin, hard shell and soft pulp, up to 25 cm (10 in) in diameter.

== Uses ==
The hard shell can be used for containers, scoops, cups etc.

== Species ==
Six species are accepted.

- Crescentia alata Kunth
- Crescentia amazonica Ducke
- Crescentia cujete L.
- Crescentia linearifolia Miers
- Crescentia mirabilis Eckman ex Urb.
- Crescentia portoricensis Britton
