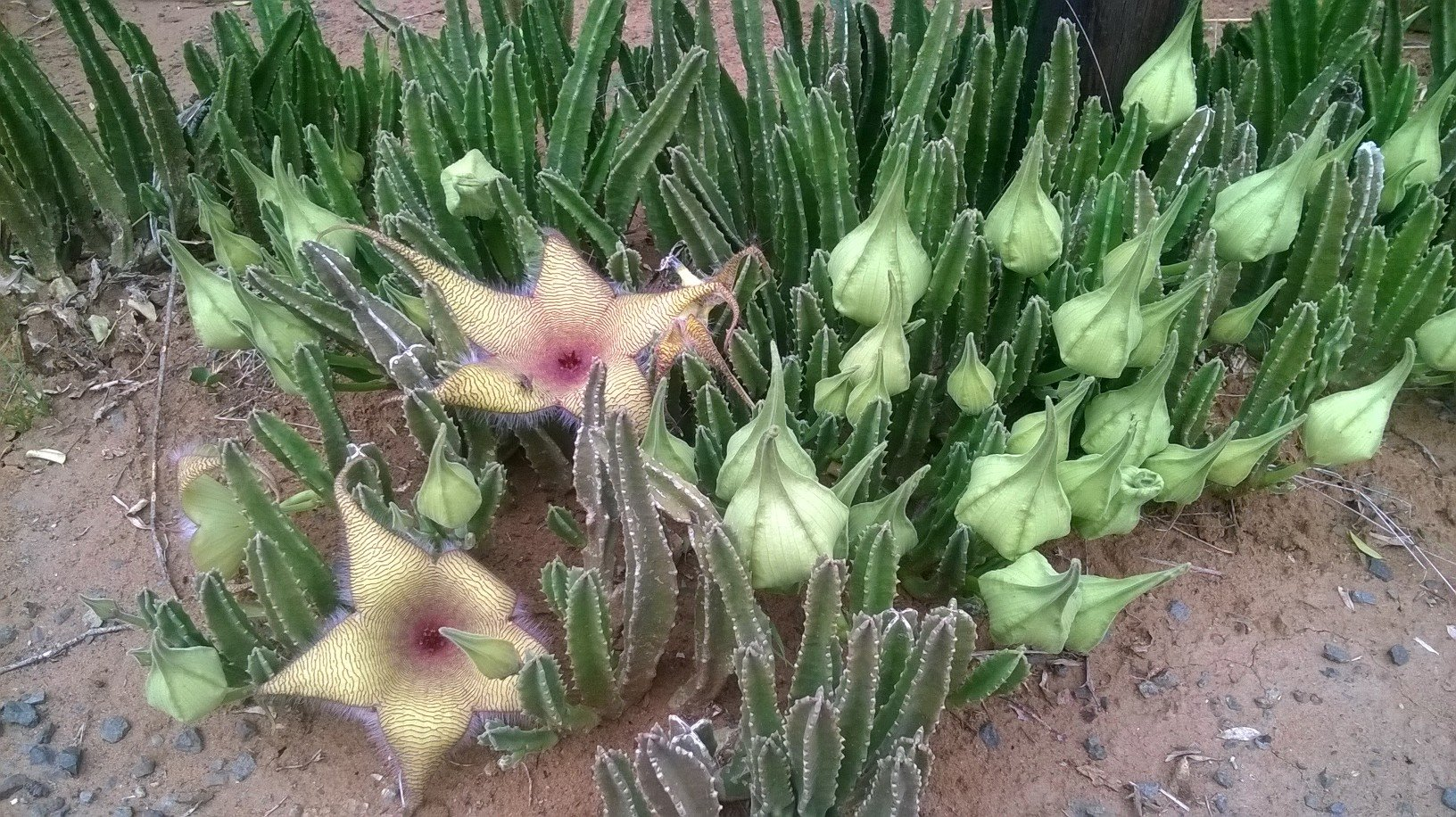
- Plant in flower, Mkuze Game Reserve, KwaZulu-Natal, South Africa

Scientific classification
- Kingdom: Plantae
- Clade: Tracheophytes
- Clade: Angiosperms
- Clade: Eudicots
- Clade: Asterids
- Order: Gentianales
- Family: Apocynaceae
- Genus: Stapelia
- Species: S. gigantea

Binomial name
- Stapelia gigantea N.E.Br.

Synonyms
- Gonostemon giganteus (N.E.Br.) P.V.Heath; Ceropegia gigantea (N.E.Br.) Bruyns; Stapelia nobilis N.E.Br.; Stapelia marlothii N.E.Br.; Stapelia youngii N.E.Br.; Stapelia cylista C.A.Lückh.

= Stapelia gigantea =

Species of flowering plant

Stapelia gigantea is a species of flowering plant in the genus Stapelia of the family Apocynaceae. Common names include carrion plant and toad plant (although the nickname "carrion plant" can also refer to Stapelia grandiflora). The plant is native to the desert regions of northeastern South Africa (KwaZulu-Natal and Northern Provinces) north to Malawi and Zambia.

== Description ==
Growing up to 25 cm (10 in) tall, it is a clump-forming succulent plant with erect green four-angled stems 3 cm (1.2 in) thick. The flowers are large, up to 40 cm (16 in) wide, star-shaped, with five petals. The flowers are red and yellow, wrinkled, with a silky texture and fringed with hairs, that can be as long as 8 mm (0.3 in). They flower throughout the year, but most prolifically in late summer, between December and April in South Africa.

The flowers have the smell of rotting flesh, in order to attract the flies which pollinate them. Scent compounds of carrion flowers responsible for their odour include diamines (putrescine and cadaverine), sulfur compounds and various phenolic molecules. Because of the foul odour of its flower, S. gigantea can act as an appetite suppressant in humans.

There have been several proposed reasons for the size of the flowers of S. gigantea. First, it is possible that they are large to attract the flies that pollinate them. The large size and colour of the flowers combined with the carrion smell may cause the flies to behave as if it is a dead carcass and be more likely to visit it.

== Ecology ==
Stapelia gigantea grows in arid areas, often on sandy soil or rocky outcrops, and often with little other vegetation, though also sometimes in or even under open shubs. In South Africa, it occurs at altitudes from 325–1,100 m.

S. gigantea can become an invasive plant when introduced in arid and semi-arid environments, although it has been found to facilitate the recruitment of nurse-dependent native taxa, those that require a suitable microhabitat created by another plant for successful germination, growth, and/or survival from impacts such as herbivory.

== Cultivation ==
Since it does not tolerate temperatures below 10 °C (50 °F) for extended periods, this plant must be grown under glass in temperate zones. It has gained the Royal Horticultural Society's Award of Garden Merit. The cultivar 'Zulu Giant' is often grown.

== Gallery ==
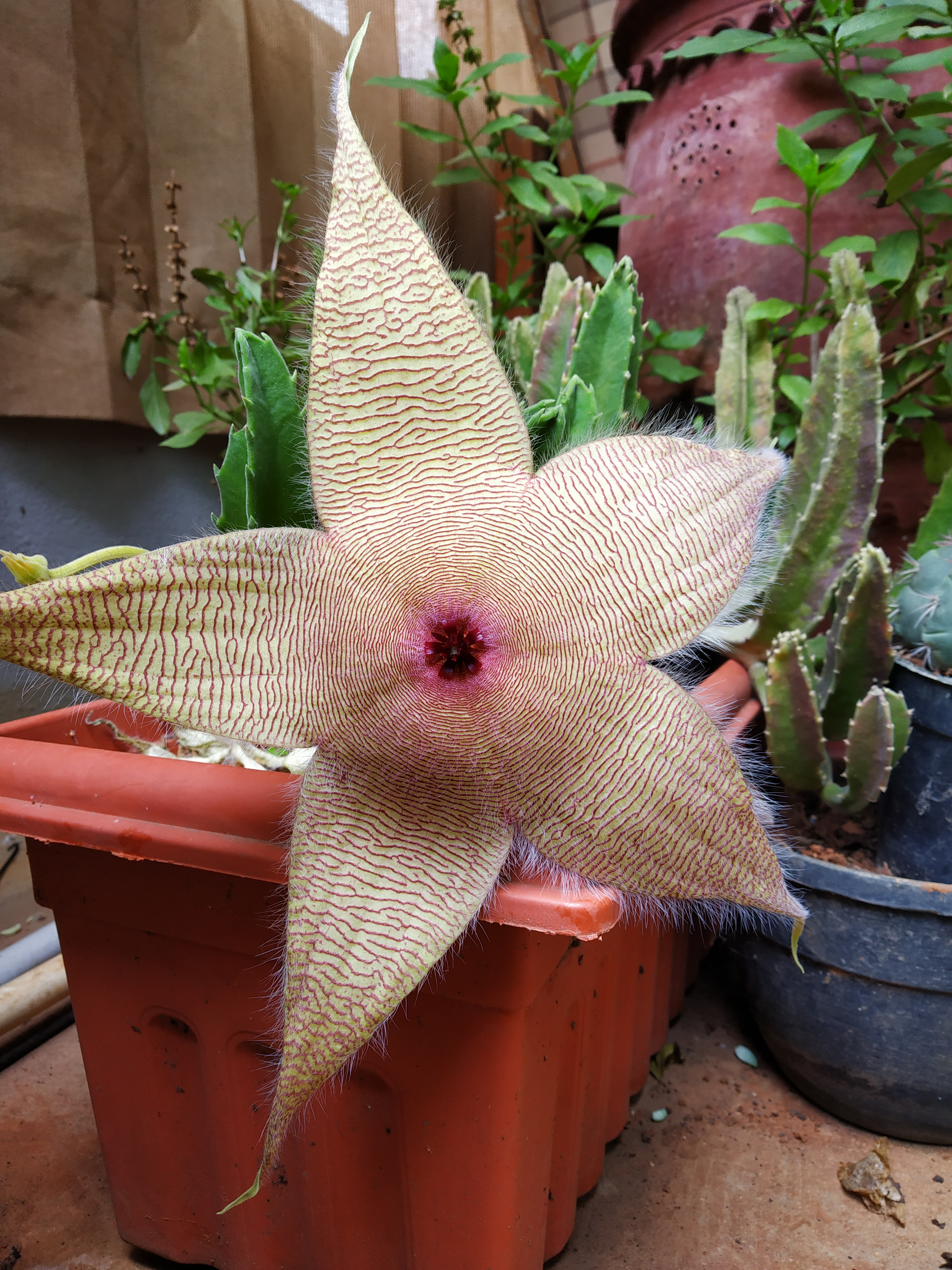
Flower and Plant

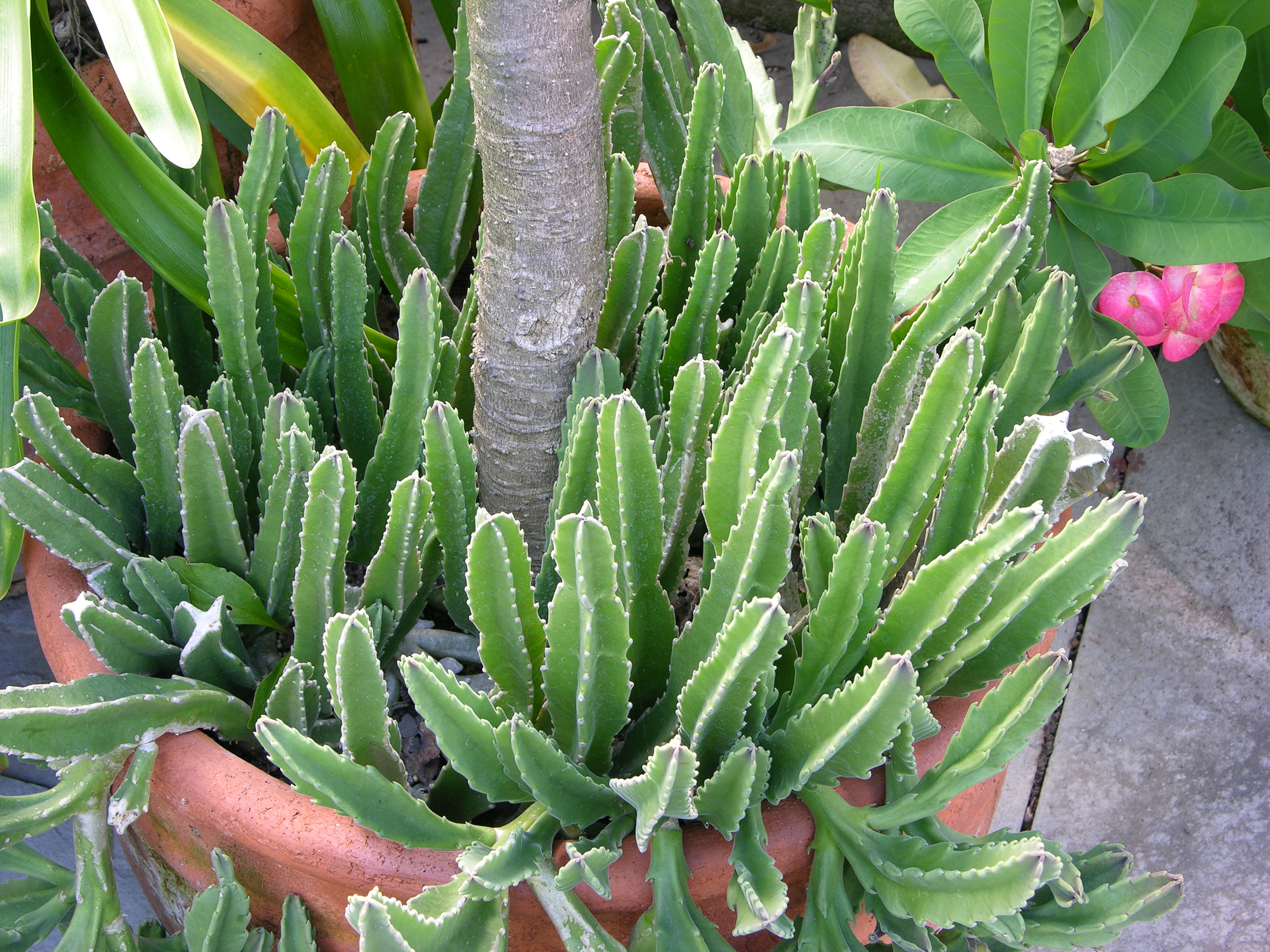
Stems

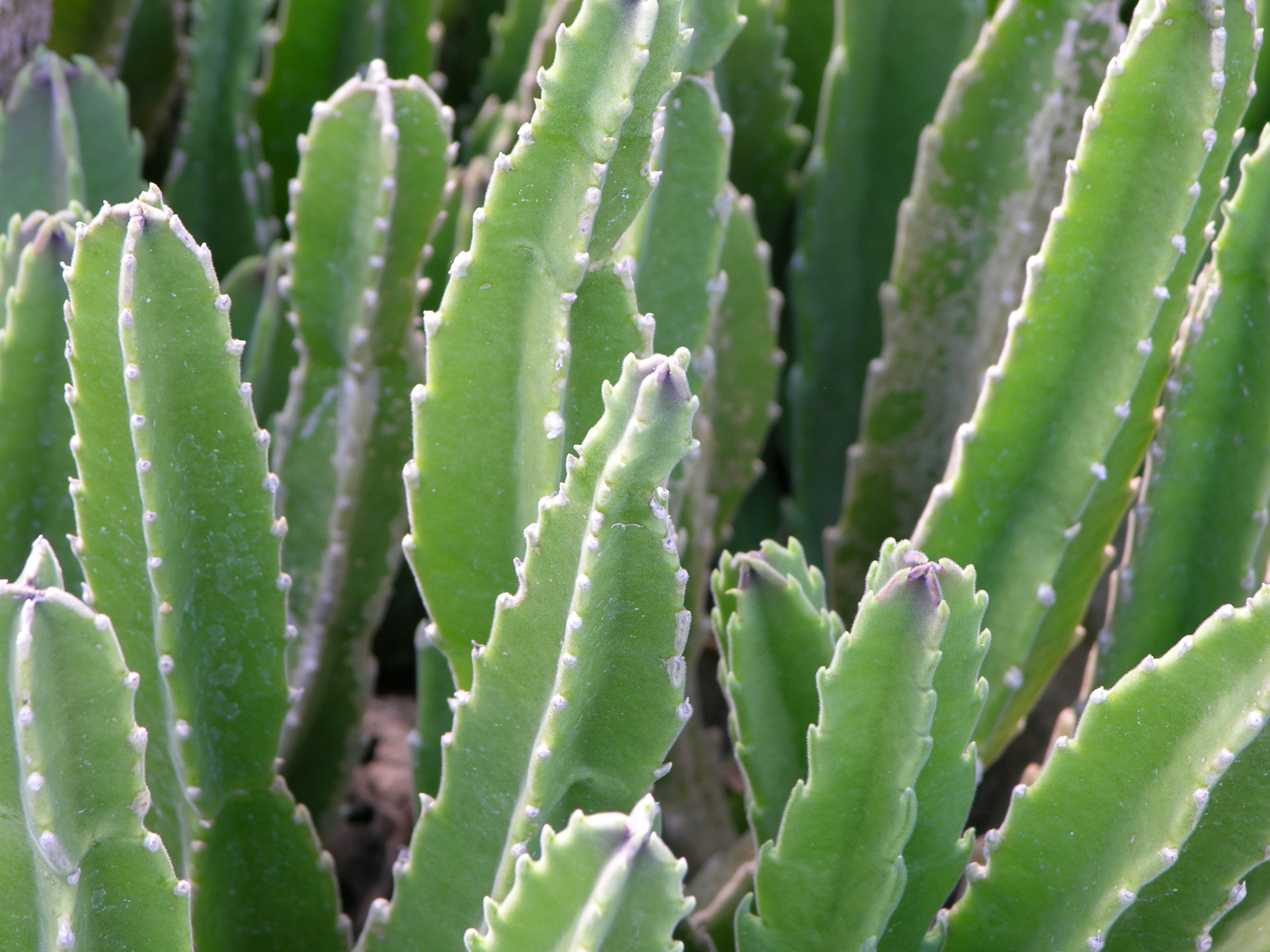
Stems

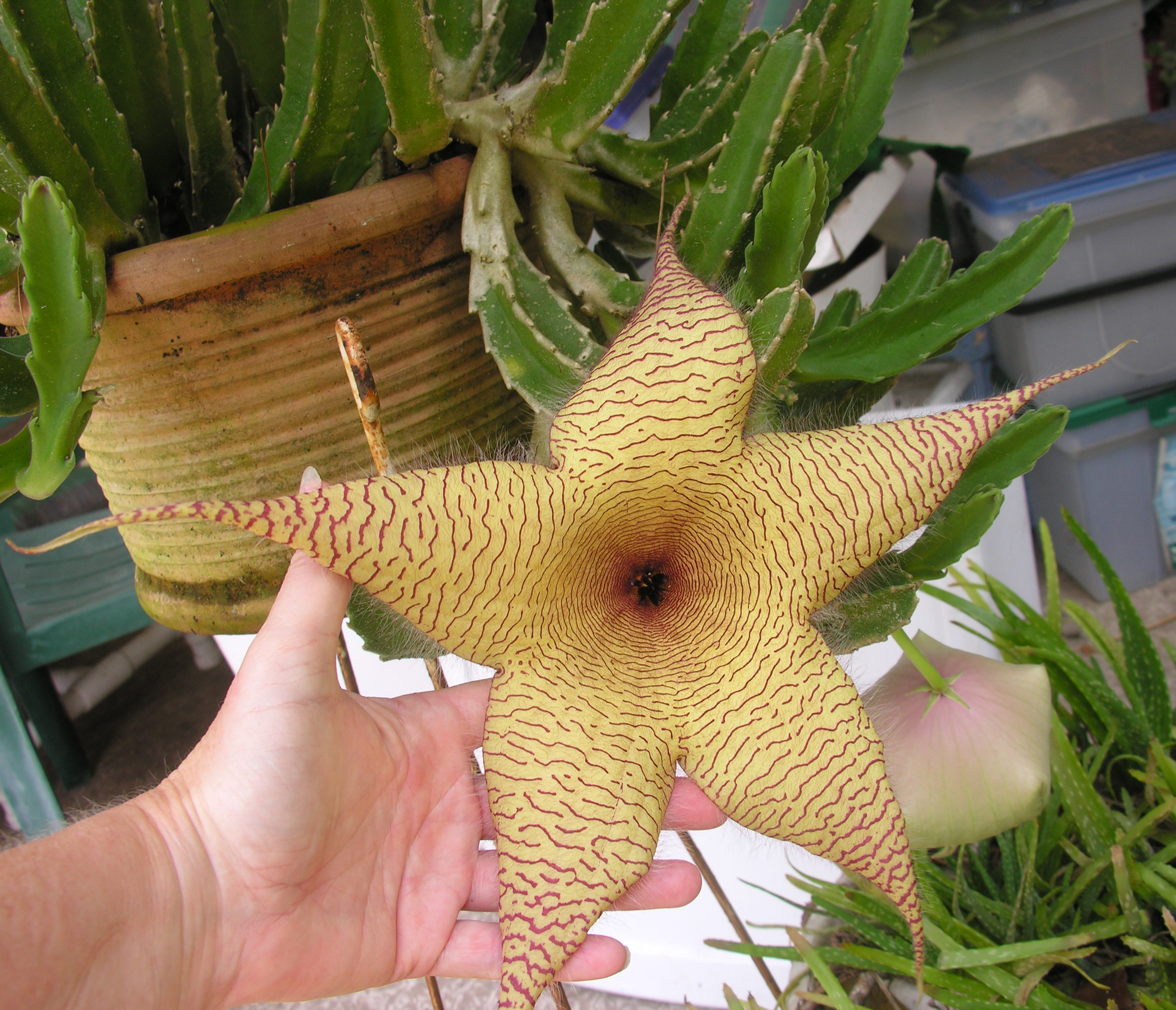
Flower and bud
