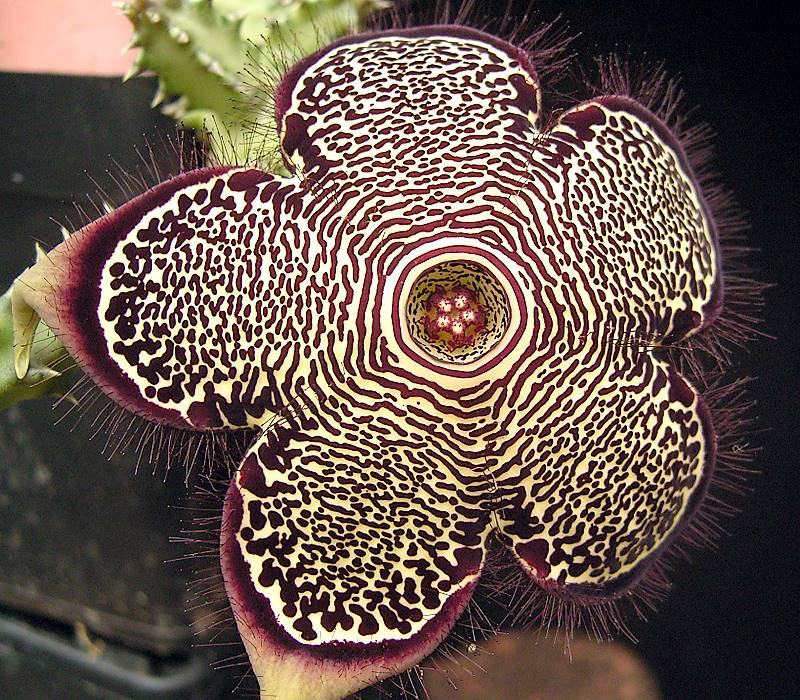
- Edithcolea grandis flower

Scientific classification
- Kingdom: Plantae
- Clade: Tracheophytes
- Clade: Angiosperms
- Clade: Eudicots
- Clade: Asterids
- Order: Gentianales
- Family: Apocynaceae
- Subfamily: Asclepiadoideae
- Tribe: Ceropegieae
- Genus: Edithcolea; N.E.Br. 1895
- Species: E. grandis

Binomial name
- Edithcolea grandis N.E.Br. 1895

Synonyms
- Edithcolea sordida N.E.Br. 1895

= Edithcolea =

Genus of flowering plants

Edithcolea is a monotypic genus with a single species Edithcolea grandis (Persian carpet flower). Once classified in the family Asclepiadaceae, it is now in the subfamily Asclepiadoideae of the dogbane family Apocynaceae. It is native to eastern Africa and to the Arabian Peninsula.

The genus is named after Edith Cole (1859–1940). She collected the type material for this plant with Lort Philips in 1895, during a botanical expedition (1894–1895) led by Ethelbert Edward Lort Phillips (1857-1944) from Berbera to the Golis mountains in Somaliland.

== Description ==
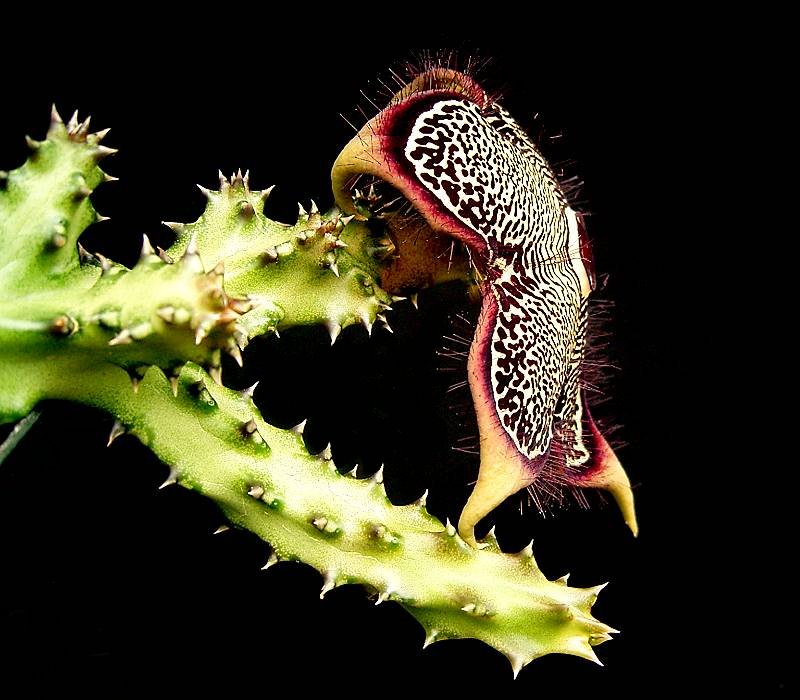
Stems with teeth-like spines

Edithcolea grandis is a succulent plant with leafless, richly branched, perennial and decumbent stems with a diameter of 2 to 4 cm and up to 30 cm in length (ref prota, ref Field 80). The glabrous stems are 4 or 5 angled and armed with regularly placed hard and acute spinelike teeth or tubercules. The base color of the plant varies from green to red with brownish spots.

The bisexual flowers are 8 to 13 cm in diameter and are formed near the apex of the branches. The flower consists of an outer corolla with 5 corolla lobes (petals), which are fused halfway to the center and a relatively small inner corolla. The outside or back side of the flower is yellow to green. The inside consist of a pale yellow base color with a purple-reddish pattern of spots at the outside that gradually become smaller near the inner corona, which itself has concentric reddish lines. Long purple hairs are present at the border of the brim of the outer corolla lobes. The flower is at times described as the Persian carpet flower. The carrion-like smell of the flowers attracts flies and other insects for pollination.

The fruit (follicles) contain a large number of seeds. The oval shaped seeds bear a tuft of hairs (coma) so they can be dispersed with the wind. The smaller variant baylissiana (Lavros & Hardy) has more branched stems that are smaller in diameter (1 to 1.5 cm), shorter (10 cm) and are often spirally twisted.

== Distribution ==
Edithcolea grandis is distributed throughout the African Great Lakes region (Kenya, Tanzania, Uganda), the Horn of Africa (Ethiopia, Somaliland) and Yemen (including the Socotra archipelago). The plant is found in dry and arid regions. Sometimes in full sun, but mostly partly shaded by rocks and shrubby vegetation.

== Usage and growth ==
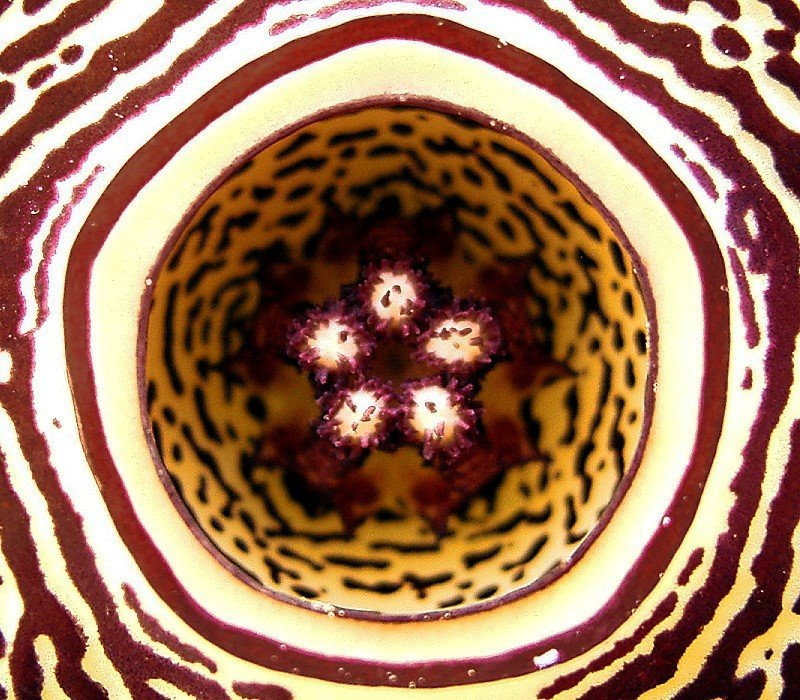
Detail of the flower

The stem of Edithcolea grandis is eaten as a vegetable in Ethiopia and Somalia. (Ref prota, ref Getahuna 1974)

Edithcolea grandis is occasionally cultivated as an ornamental in desert gardens worldwide. It has a gained a reputation as a particularly difficult plant to keep because of its very specific growing needs with much light and relatively high (above 15 °C) winter temperatures. It's very susceptible to rot in combination with low temperatures.

== Literature ==
- D.V. Field. Edithcolea grandis. Asklepios 20: 18–21, 1980.
- J.J. Lavranos & D.S. Hardy. Edithcolea grandis var. baylissiana Lavranos & Hardy. Asklepios 20: 21–23, 1980.
- Focke Albers und Ulrich Meve (Hrsg.): Illustrated handbook of succulent plants, Volume 3. Springer-Verlag 2002, 335 pages, ISBN 3-540-41964-0.
- Sigrid Liede-Schumann und Ulrich Meve: The Genera of Asclepiadoideae, Secamonoideae and Periplocoideae (Apocynaceae): Edithcolea - Online. (in Englisch)
- PROTA 2: Vegetables / Légumes 2004, page 292. Backhuys Publishers. ISBN 978-90-5782-147-9
- J.J. Lavranos, D.S. Hardy, 1963.
- Flora of tropical Africa, Volume 4, Section 1, Daniel Oliver, L. Reeve, 1937, reprint 1958
- Diagnoses Africanæ, VII. Bulletin of Miscellaneous Information (Royal Gardens, Kew), Vol. 1895, No. 105 (1895), pp. 211–230, Royal Botanic Gardens, Kew. https://www.jstor.org/stable/4114977?seq=10
- Amare Getahuna. The role of wild plants in the native diet in Ethiopia. Agro-Ecosystems. Volume 1, 1974, Pages 45–56.
