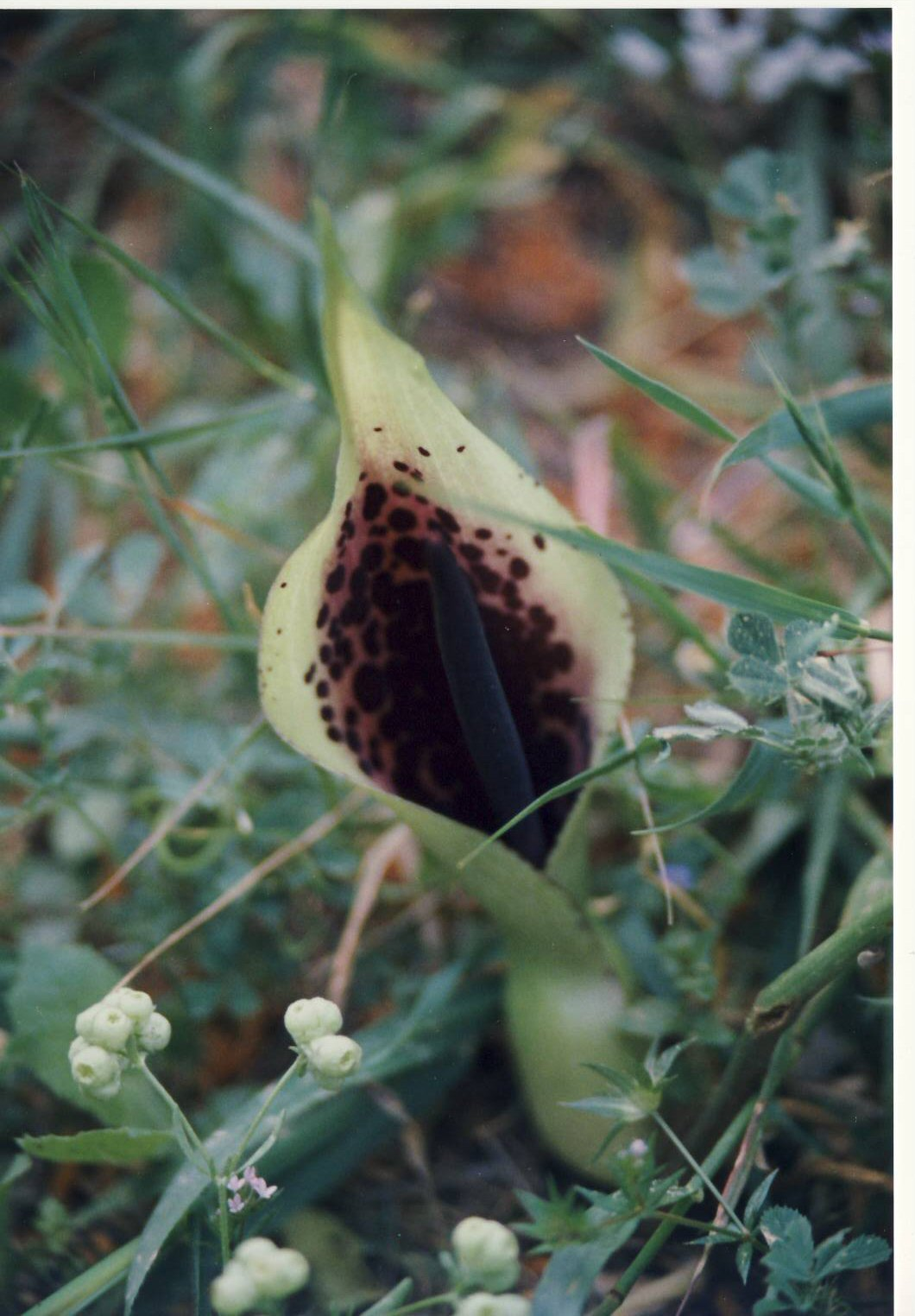

Scientific classification
- Kingdom: Plantae
- Clade: Tracheophytes
- Clade: Angiosperms
- Clade: Monocots
- Order: Alismatales
- Family: Araceae
- Genus: Arum
- Species: A. dioscoridis

Binomial name
- Arum dioscoridis Sm.

= Arum dioscoridis =

Species of flowering plant

Arum dioscoridis, commonly known as the Spotted arum, is a plant of the arum family (Araceae).

The plant was described by James Edward Smith in Flora Graeca (1816). The species is named after the ancient Greek physician and botanist Pedanius Dioscorides.

The plant is native to forests in the east of the Mediterranean in southern Turkey, Cyprus, Greece and the Middle East.

== Description ==
In winter appear green, arrow-shaped leaves. In spring, the short-stalked inflorescence appears consisting of a black, rod-shaped spadix surrounded by a yellow-green, purple-mottled brown or even purple bract (spathe). The color pattern of the spathe is variable, and multiple varieties have been described based on different patterns.

The female flowers are located at the bottom of the spadix; above are the male flowers; and the top is a sterile area (appendix). The spadix emits a pungent smell that attracts flies as pollinators.

By relative inflorescence height, Arum species are divided into "cryptic" species, whose inflorescences are borne on a short peduncle amid or below the leaves, and "flag" species, whose inflorescences are above leaf level at the end of long peduncles. A. dioscoridis is a cryptic species.

== Cultivation ==
The plant can be grown as an ornamental plant in rock gardens Mediterranean regions. In the Benelux, the plant can be grown indoors as a pot plant. The plant can be propagated by seeding.

== Bibliography ==
- Łuczaj, Łukasz; Emre, Gizem (2025-02-13). "Lords-and-Ladies (Arum) as Food in Eurasia: A Review". Plants. 14 (4): 577. Bibcode:2025Plnts..14..577L. doi:10.3390/plants14040577. eISSN 2223-7747. PMC 11859539.
- "Radical scavenging activity and chemical composition of methanolic extract from Arum dioscoridis Sm. var. dioscoridis and determination of its mineral and trace elements". Journal of the Turkish Chemical Society, Section A: Chemistry. 5 (1): 205–218. 2018 [published 2017-09-01]. doi:10.18596/jotcsa.350370. eISSN 2149-0120.
- Gibernau, Marc; Macquart, David; Przetak, Gilles (2004). "Pollination in the genus Arum – a review" (PDF). Aroideana. 27: 148–166. ISSN 0197-4033.
- Kite, Geoffrey C.; et al. (2000). "Inflorescence odours and pollinators of Arum and Amorphophallus (Araceae)" (PDF). Reproductive Biology in Systematics, Conservation and Economic Botany. pp. 295–315. ISBN 1900347628.
- Hruby, Johann (1912). "Le genre Arum: Aperçu systématique avec considérations spéciales sur les relations phylogénétiques des formes" [The Genus Arum: A Systematic Overview with Special Considerations on the Phylogenetic Relations of its Forms]. Bulletin de la Société botanique de Genève II (in French) (4). Geneva: 113–160. ISSN 0366-3108.
