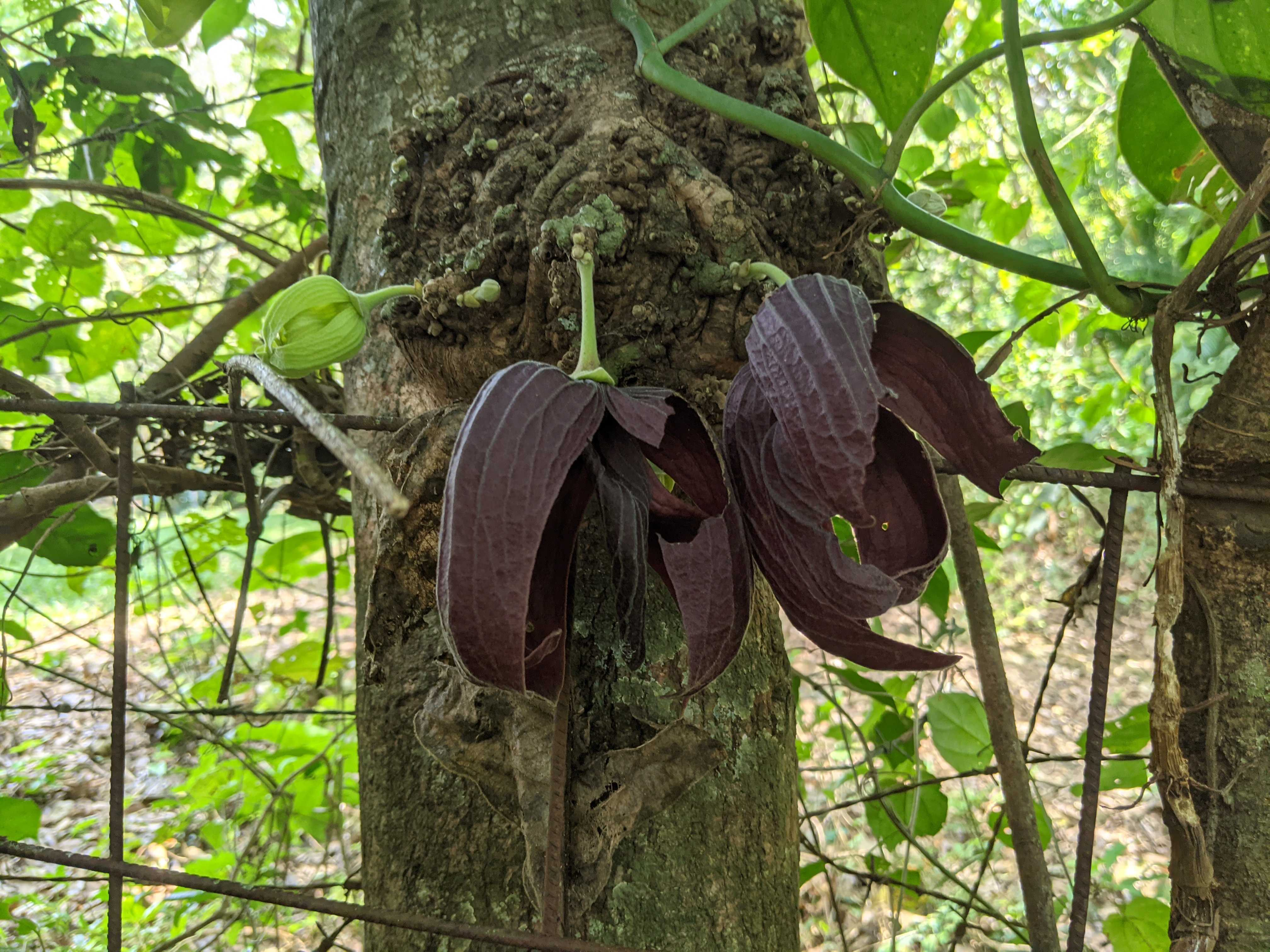
- Sapranthus palanga at anthesis
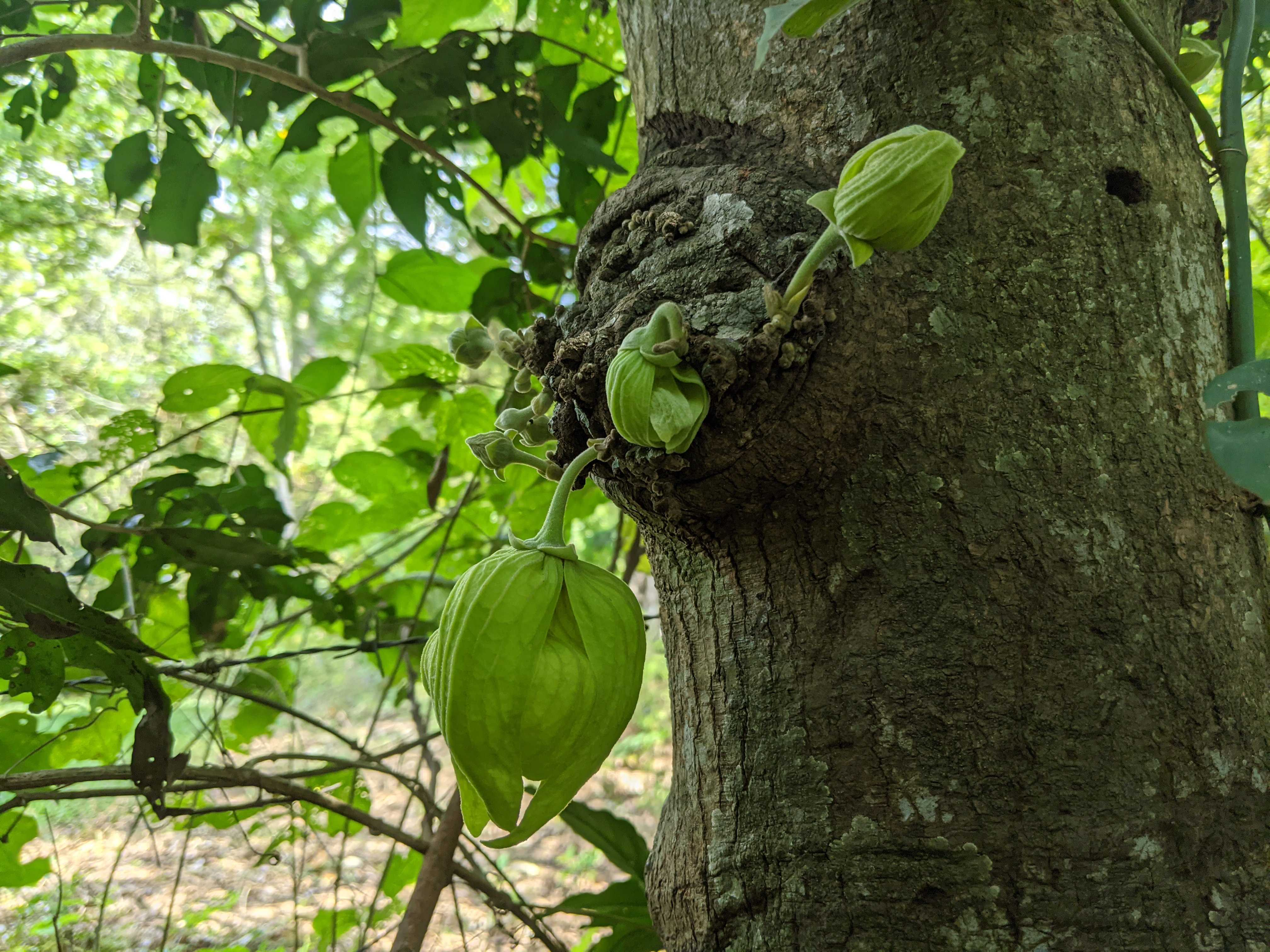
- Sapranthus palanga in preanthesis

Conservation status
- Least Concern (IUCN 3.1)

Scientific classification
- Kingdom: Plantae
- Clade: Embryophytes
- Clade: Tracheophytes
- Clade: Spermatophytes
- Clade: Angiosperms
- Clade: Magnoliids
- Order: Magnoliales
- Family: Annonaceae
- Genus: Sapranthus
- Species: S. palanga

Binomial name
- Sapranthus palanga R.E.Fr.

Synonyms
- Sapranthus palanga var. santae-rosae R.E.Fr.

= Sapranthus palanga =

Species of tree

Sapranthus palanga, commonly known as palanca, is a species of cauliflorous tree in the family Annonaceae, native to the tropical regions of Central America, especially Costa Rica.

This species was recently separated from Sapranthus violaceus, on the basis of cauliflory (flowers emerging from the side of stem instead of shoots).

The flowers are dark purple when mature and emit amines such as putrescine and cadaverine which mimic the smell of a rotting carcass to attract target pollinating agents such as flies.
