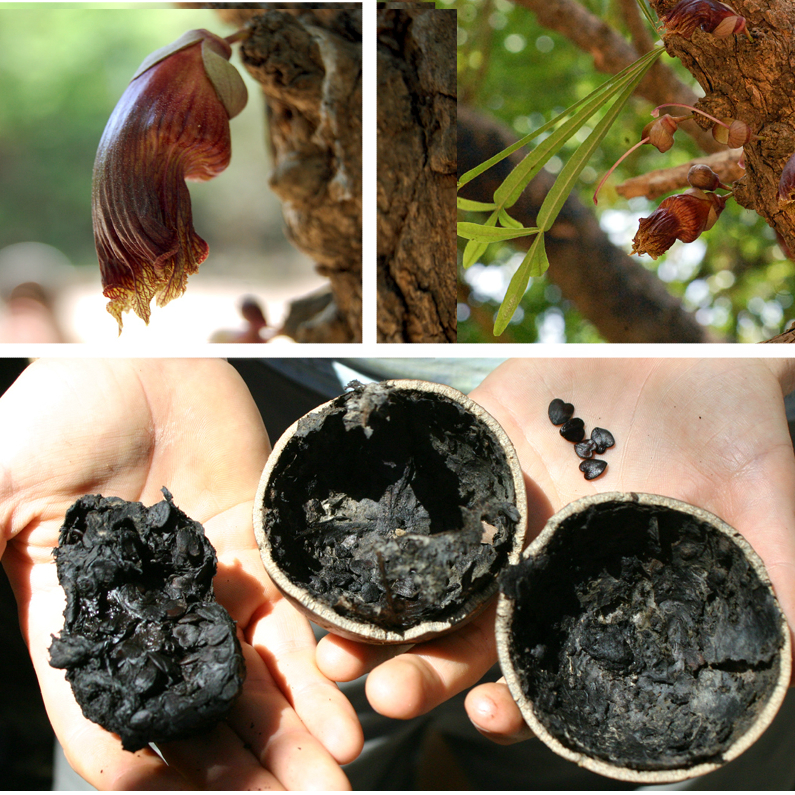

Scientific classification
- Kingdom: Plantae
- Clade: Tracheophytes
- Clade: Angiosperms
- Clade: Eudicots
- Clade: Asterids
- Order: Lamiales
- Family: Bignoniaceae
- Genus: Crescentia
- Species: C. alata

Binomial name
- Crescentia alata Kunth
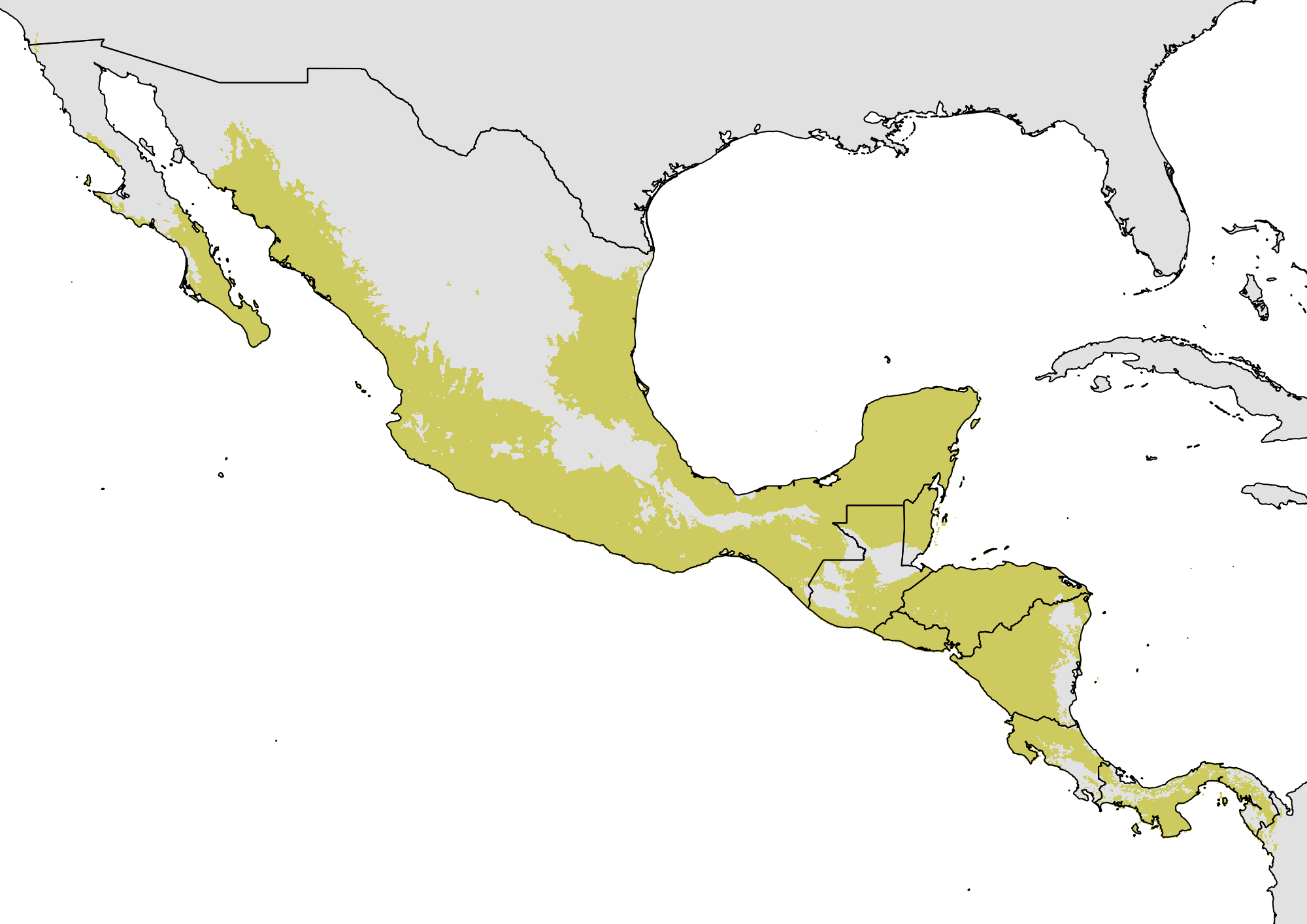

= Crescentia alata =

Species of tree

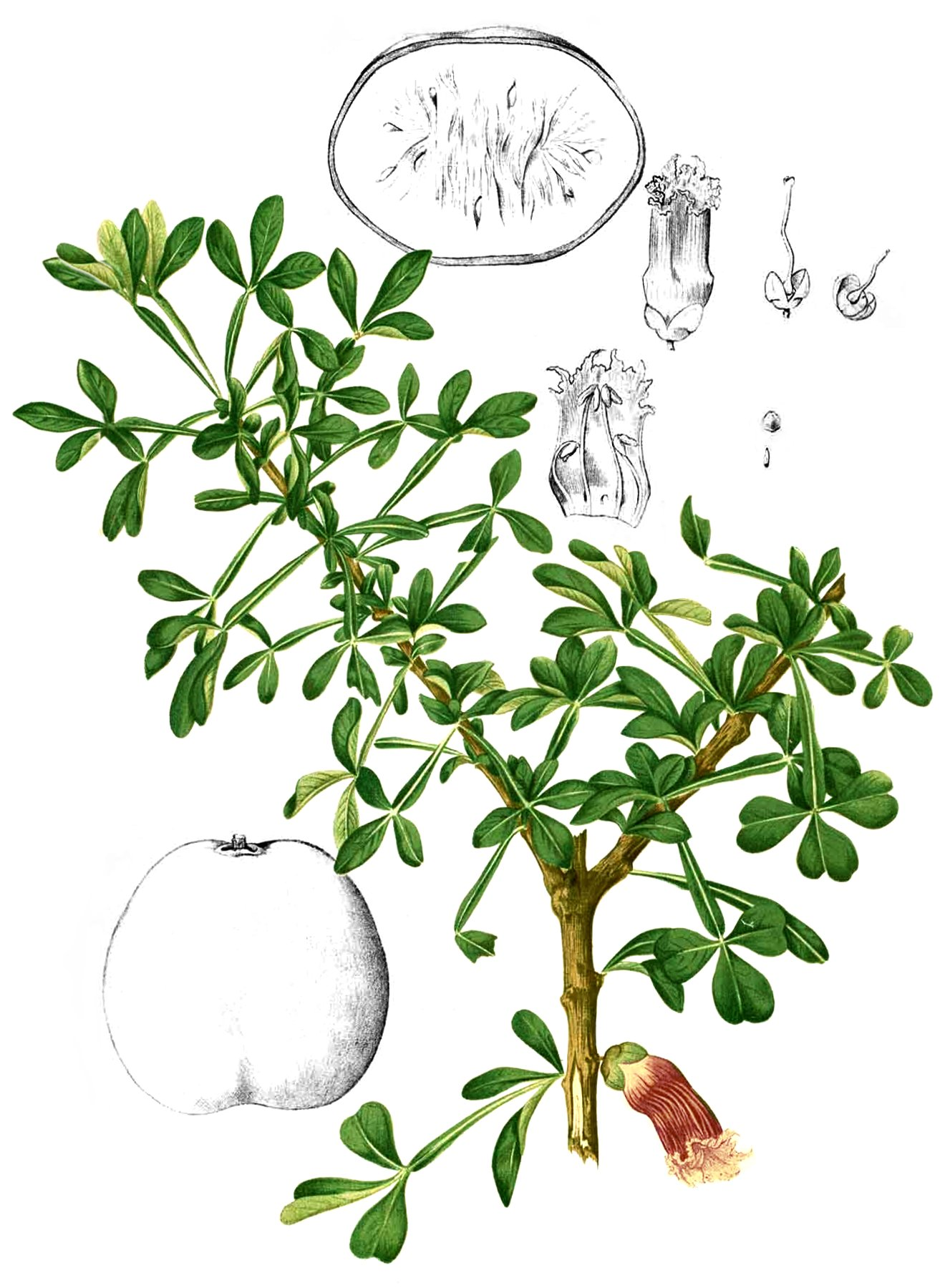
C. alata diagram.

Crescentia alata, variously called Mexican calabash, jícaro, morro, morrito, or winged calabash, is a plant species in the family Bignoniaceae and in the genus Crescentia, native to Mexico, Central America south to Costa Rica.

== Description ==
It is a small tree growing to 8 m tall. It has hard, cannonball-like fruit 7–10 cm diameter, that are difficult to break into. It is believed that these fruit characteristics evolved as a defense mechanism against seed predation by long-dead megafauna of the region. However, now it seems to be a counter-productive strategy (an evolutionary anachronism), as the seeds inside the fruit cannot germinate unless the shells are broken open, and with the exception of horses and humans, no animals currently living in its native range can break open the fruit.

It has been observed that domestic horses may smash the fruit with their hooves and eat the pulp and seeds (suggesting that they may serve as seed distribution vectors).

Daniel Janzen suggested that gomphotheres (extinct elephant-like animals) may have previously been responsible for the dispersal of C. alata seeds. With their extinction, C. alata became threatened with the possibility of habitat loss and suffered an extremely limited ability to migrate, but the introduction of a new vector, in the form of domestic horses, has allowed the species to maintain its viability. C. alata is, not surprisingly, most often found in open areas, such as pastures and fields. It is also cultivated for its gourd-like fruit, which may be hollowed and dried and used as containers for food and drink. In Central America, dried and painted gourd-like fruit are used by local people for making artisanal handicrafts such as piggy banks and ornaments. The leaves resemble those of the trifoliate orange Citrus trifoliata with a wide petiole which resembles a fourth leaflet.

== Historical usage ==
The fruit plays a role in the Popol Vuh (book of myths of the Mayan civilization). After the first generation of hero twins, 1 Hunajpu and 7 Hunajpu, fail and are killed in the ball game in Xibalba, the demonic Xibalbans hang their skull in this tree. The skull later spits in the hand of the Xibalban princess Ixquic, thus impregnating her and begetting the second, successful generation of Maya Hero Twins.

The seeds are edible and high in protein with a licorice-like sweet taste, used in Honduras, El Salvador and Nicaragua to make a kind of horchata called semilla de jícaro.
