= Trillium viride =

Scientific classification
- Kingdom: Plantae
- Clade: Tracheophytes
- Clade: Angiosperms
- Clade: Monocots
- Order: Liliales
- Family: Melanthiaceae
- Genus: Trillium
- Species: T. viride

Binomial name
- Trillium viride L.C.Beck

Species of flowering plant

Trillium viride, commonly called the wood wakerobin, is a species of flowering plant in the family Melanthiaceae. It is found in the central United States, in certain parts of Missouri and Illinois. The specific epithet viride means "youthful" or "fresh-green", an apparent reference to the color of the plant's flower petals. For this reason, it is also called the green trillium, not to be confused with other green-flowered trilliums such as T. viridescens and the green form of T. sessile, both of which are found in Missouri.

== Description ==
Trillium viride is a perennial herb up to 35 cm tall. Flowers are sometimes entirely green, sometimes entirely purple, sometimes 2-tone with green and purple streaks or bands. The plant grows in richly wooded areas, often on steep hillsides.

=== Similar species ===
Since T. viride and T. viridescens are morphologically similar, they are often confused. The following table compares the two species character by character:

	T. viride	T. viridescens
Leaves	Leaves narrowly to broadly elliptic; apex blunt to rounded-acute	Leaves ovate-elliptic to broadly so; apex acuminate
Flowers	Petals green or yellowish-green (rarely all purple) above a weak purplish claw; odor of rotten fruit	Petals green or yellowish-green (rarely all purple) above a distinct purplish claw; odor musty
Floral organs	Carpels two-thirds the height of the stamens; anthers introrse/latrorse; stigmas rarely extending between stamens	Carpels half the height of the stamens; anthers latrorse; stigmas usually extending between the stamens
Fruits	Fruit ovoid, angled, green-white	Fruit ovoid, angled, dark purplish-green or green

Most importantly, T. viride exhibits one unique feature among all trilliums: the entire upper surface of each leaf is covered with numerous stomata, seen to the naked eye as tiny white dots. In comparison, T. viridescens has at most a few stomata near the leaf tip only.

T. viride has numerous other look-alikes. Of particular importance is T. sessile, which may have yellow-green petals. The two are readily distinguished by examining their respective floral dimensions. The stamens of T. sessile are more than half the length of its petals whereas the stamens of T. viride are less than half the length of its petals.

== Taxonomy ==
Trillium viride was named and described by the American botanist Lewis Caleb Beck in 1826.

== Distribution ==
Trillium viride occurs within a relatively small region along the Missouri River in east-central Missouri, and along both sides of the Mississippi River in eastern Missouri and southwestern Illinois. It prefers rich woods, bluffs, and rocky hillsides.

T. viride is known to occur in the following counties in Missouri and Illinois:

- Missouri: Audrain, **Barry**, Benton, Bollinger, Boone, Butler, Callaway, Carter, Crawford, Franklin, Iron, **Jefferson**, Lincoln, Madison, Moniteau, Montgomery, Perry, Pike, Ralls, Saint Charles, Saint Francois, Saint Genevieve, Saint Louis, Saint Louis City, **Taney**, Warren, Washington, Wayne
- Illinois: Adams, Franklin, Jackson, Macoupin, Perry, Pike, Union, Williamson

In the above lists, boldface indicate those counties where both T. viride and T. viridescens are known to occur.

== Bibliography ==
- Beck, Lewis Caleb (1826). "Contributions towards the botany of the states of Illinois and Missouri". American Journal of Science and Arts. 11 (1): 167–182.
- Case, Frederick W.; Case, Roberta B. (1997). Trilliums. Portland, Oregon: Timber Press. ISBN 978-0-88192-374-2.
- Freeman, J. D. (1975). "Revision of Trillium subgenus Phyllantherum (Liliaceae)". Brittonia. 27 (1): 1–62. Bibcode:1975Britt..27....1F. doi:10.2307/2805646. JSTOR 2805646. S2CID 20824379.
