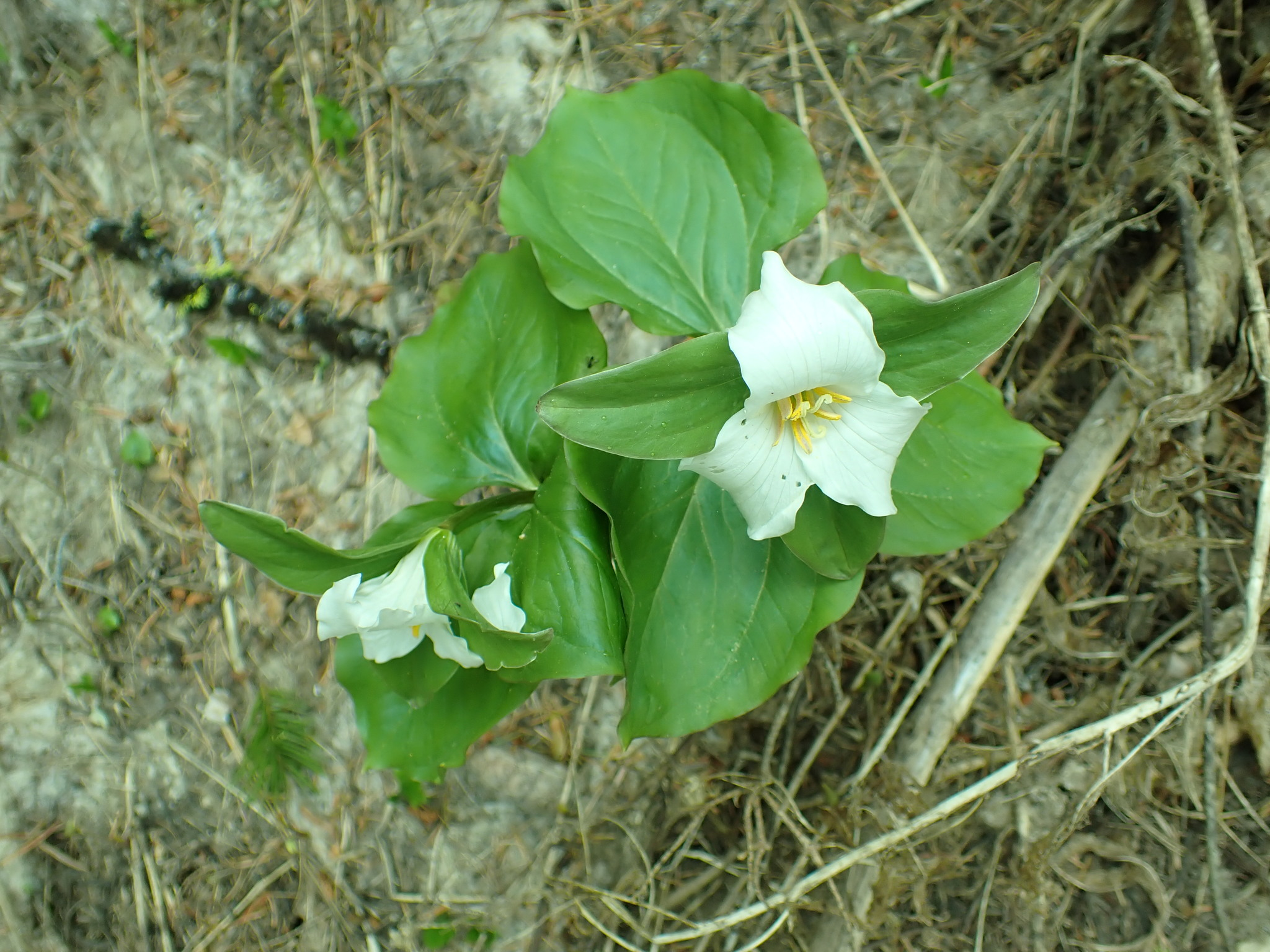
- Chelan County, Washington (May 2022)

Conservation status
- Critically Imperiled (NatureServe)

Scientific classification
- Kingdom: Plantae
- Clade: Tracheophytes
- Clade: Angiosperms
- Clade: Monocots
- Order: Liliales
- Family: Melanthiaceae
- Genus: Trillium
- Species: T. crassifolium

Binomial name
- Trillium crassifolium Piper

= Trillium crassifolium =

Species of flowering plant

Trillium crassifolium, the Wenatchee Mountains trillium, is a species of flowering plant in the bunchflower family Melanthiaceae. It was previously thought to be endemic to the Wenatchee Mountains in Washington but recent findings suggest its range extends into Oregon and Idaho as well.

== Description ==
Trillium crassifolium is a perennial herbaceous plant that persists by means of an underground rhizome. Like all trilliums, it has a whorl of three bracts (leaves) and a single trimerous flower with 3 sepals, 3 petals, two whorls of 3 stamens each, and 3 carpels fused into a single ovary with 3 stigmas.

Like other members of the Trillium ovatum complex, the flower of Trillium crassifolium is stalked (not sessile). The flower petals are white at the onset of anthesis, fading to red or purple as the flower ages. It differs from Trillium ovatum by having erect rhizomes, shorter petals, and thickish leaves. In general, the sepals and petals of Trillium crassifolium are more-or-less the same length whereas the sepals of Trillium ovatum are much shorter than the petals.

The leaves of mature plants of Trillium crassifolium are elliptic (not ovate or rhombic) with their widest point near the middle. The leaf tips are obtuse to slightly acuminate. It has flattened filaments, a unique feature among the pedicellate trilliums of western North America.

== Taxonomy ==
Trillium crassifolium was described by the American botanist and agriculturalist Charles Vancouver Piper in 1899. Its type specimen was collected by the American botanist Kirk Whited near Wenatchee, Washington earlier that same year. At the time, some authorities considered Trillium crassifolium Piper to be a synonym for Trillium ovatum Pursh, but as of April 2024 it is widely accepted as a distinct species. The specific name crassifolium means "with thick, fleshy or leathery leaves".

Trillium crassifolium is a member of the grandiflorum group (Trillium subgen. Callipetalon), which includes all members of the Trillium ovatum complex. Based on phylogenetic analysis, Trillium crassifolium was placed as sister to Trillium nivale Riddell of the eastern United States, not Trillium ovatum as previously assumed.

== Distribution and habitat ==
Trillium crassifolium was originally collected near Wenatchee, Washington and for a long time it was thought to be endemic to the Wenatchee Mountains. In 2024, the species was reported to be more broadly distributed in the Blue Mountains and Rocky Mountains of Oregon, Washington, and west-central Idaho, but by that time, it had become known as the Wenatchee Mountains Trillium.

== Conservation ==
In 2019, based on available evidence, the global conservation status of Trillium crassifolium was determined to be Critically Imperiled (G1). Since then the species is reported to have a wider distribution, but as of April 2024 its conservation status has not been reviewed.

== Bibliography ==
- Gleason, Henry Allan (July 1906). "The pedunculate species of Trillium". Bulletin of the Torrey Botanical Club. 33 (7): 387–396. doi:10.2307/2478819. hdl:2027/hvd.32044106472392. JSTOR 2478819.
- Gledhill, David (2008). The Names of Plants (4th ed.). Cambridge University Press. ISBN 978-0-521-86645-3.
- Lampley, Jayne A.; Gereau, Roy; Floden, Aaron; Schilling, Edward E. (2022-07-05). "A revised subgeneric classification of Trillium (Parideae, Melanthiaceae)". Phytotaxa. 552 (5): 278–286. Bibcode:2022Phytx.552..278L. doi:10.11646/phytotaxa.552.5.1. S2CID 250368253.
- Meredith, Clayton; Frances, Anne; Highland, Amy; Oliver, Leah; Floden, Aaron; Gaddy, L.L.; Knapp, Wesley; Leaman, Danna; Leopold, Susan; Littlefield, Tara; Raguso, Robert; Schilling, Edward; Schotz, Alfred; Walker, Anna; Wayman, Kjirsten (2022). The Conservation Status of Trillium in North America. Hockessin, DE and Albuquerque, NM: Mt. Cuba Center, and New Mexico BioPark Society. ISBN 979-8-9850471-0-3.
- Piper, Charles (1899). "Trillium crassifolium". Erythea. 7: 104.
- Piper, Charles V. (1906). Flora of the state of Washington. Contributions from the United States National Herbarium. Vol. XI. Washington: Government Printing Office. doi:10.5962/bhl.title.21155.
- Wayman, Kjirsten A.; Wright, Alexander J.; Renner, Maralyn; Floden, Aaron; Lampley, Jayne A.; Farmer, Susan B.; Schilling, Edward E. (6 March 2024). "New insights into systematics of the Trillium ovatum complex". Madroño. 70 (3): 158–171. doi:10.3120/0024-9637-70.3.158.
