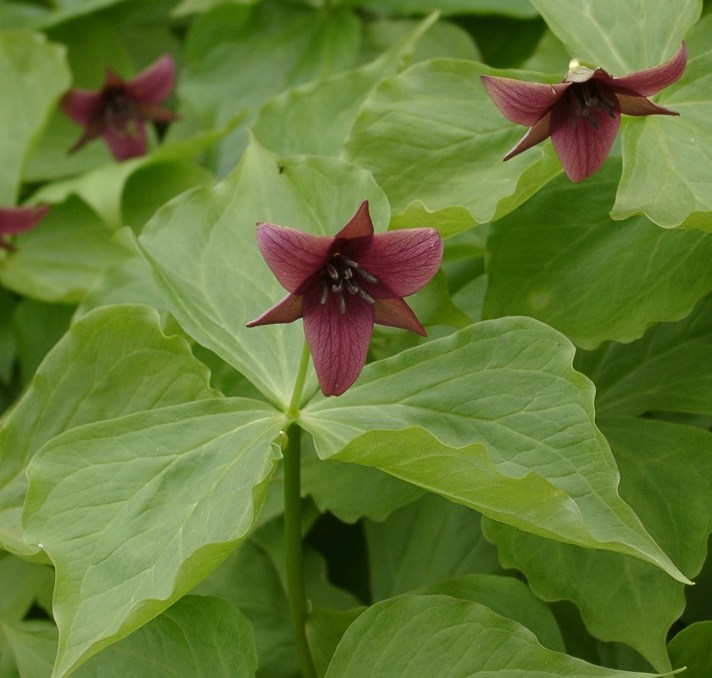
- Trillium erectum (red trillium)

Scientific classification
- Kingdom: Plantae
- Clade: Embryophytes
- Clade: Tracheophytes
- Clade: Angiosperms
- Clade: Monocots
- Order: Liliales
- Family: Melanthiaceae
- Tribe: Parideae
- Genus: Trillium; L.

Type species
- Trillium cernuum L.

Synonyms
- Trillium: Delostylis Raf.; Esdra Salisb.; Huxhamia Garden; Phyllantherum Raf.; Trillidium Kunth

= Trillium =

Genus of flowering plants

Trillium (trillium, wakerobin, toadshade, tri flower, birthroot, birthwort, and sometimes "wood lily") is a genus of about fifty flowering plant species in the family Melanthiaceae. Trillium species are native to temperate regions of North America and Asia, with the greatest diversity of species found in the southern Appalachian Mountains in the southeastern United States.

== Description ==
Plants of this genus are perennial herbs growing from rhizomes. There are three large leaf-like bracts arranged in a whorl about a scape that rises directly from the rhizome. There are no true aboveground leaves but sometimes there are scale-like leaves on the underground rhizome. The bracts are photosynthetic and are sometimes called leaves. The inflorescence is a single flower with three green or reddish sepals and three petals in shades of red, purple, pink, white, yellow, or green. At the center of the flower there are six stamens and three stigmas borne on a very short style, if any. The fruit is fleshy and capsule-like or berrylike. The seeds have large, oily elaiosomes.

Occasionally individuals have four-fold symmetry, with four bracts (leaves), four sepals, and four petals in the blossom.. The tetramerous condition has been described for several species of Trillium including T. chloropetalum, T. erectum, T. grandiflorum, T. maculatum, T. sessile, and T. undulatum.

== Taxonomy ==
In 1753, Swedish botanist Carl Linnaeus established the genus Trillium by recognizing three species, Trillium cernuum, Trillium erectum, and Trillium sessile. The type specimen Trillium cernuum described by Linnaeus was actually Trillium catesbaei, an oversight that subsequently led to much confusion regarding the type species of this genus.

Initially the Trillium genus was placed in the family Liliaceae. In the nineteenth and early twentieth centuries it was sometimes placed in a smaller family, Trilliaceae. By 1981 Liliaceae had grown to about 280 genera and 4,000 species. As it became clearer that the very large version of Liliaceae was polyphyletic, some botanists preferred to place Trillium and related genera into that separate family. Others defined a larger family, Melanthiaceae, for a similar purpose, but included several other genera not historically recognized as close relatives of Trillium. This latter approach was followed in 1998 by the Angiosperm Phylogeny Group, which assigned the genus Trillium, along with its close relative Paris, to the family Melanthiaceae. However, other taxonomists have since preferred to break up the heterogenous Melanthiaceae into several smaller monophyletic families, each with more coherent morphological features, returning Trillium to a resurrected Trilliaceae.

In 1850, German botanist Carl Sigismund Kunth segregated Trillium govanianum Wall. ex D.Don into genus Trillidium. Some authorities consider Trillidium Kunth to be a synonym for Trillium L., while others recognize the taxon Trillidium govanianum (Wall. ex D.Don) Kunth based on morphological differences (with other Trillium species) and molecular evidence. Still others support the segregation of Trillium undulatum Willd. into genus Trillidium alongside Trillidium govanianum.

== Subdivisions ==
All names used in this section are taken from the International Plant Names Index. As of February 2022, Plants of the World Online (POWO) accepts 49 species and 5 named hybrids, all of which are listed below. The geographical locations are taken from POWO and the Flora of North America, except where noted.

The Trillium genus has traditionally been divided into two subgenera, Trillium subgenus Trillium and Trillium subgenus Phyllantherum, based on whether the flower is pedicellate or sessile. At the time, the former subgenus was considered to be the more primitive group. Based on molecular systematics, Trillium subgen. Phyllantherum has been shown to be a monophyletic group, but its segregation renders the remaining Trillium subgen. Trillium paraphyletic.

Trillium subgenus Phyllantherum was named by Constantine Samuel Rafinesque in 1820, but since he did not provide a description, the name was declared invalid in 2014. At that time, the correct name was thought to be Trillium subgen. Sessilium, which was described by Rafinesque in 1830. However, that name was later found to be incorrect as well. As of July 2022, the correct name of the subgenus is Trillium L. subgen. Sessilia Raf. Its type species is Trillium sessile L.

In 1819, Rafinesque described and named the genus Delostylis, and then placed Trillium stylosum Nutt. (now a synonym for Trillium catesbaei Elliott) into the new genus. Reversing himself a decade later, Rafinesque instead placed Trillium stylosum into a new subgenus Delostylium in 1830. Presumably Rafinesque had intended the subgeneric name to replace the earlier generic name, and so the correct name of the former is Trillium L. subgen. Delostylis (Raf.) Raf.. Its type species is Trillium catesbaei. Historically, the subgenus has been known as the Catesbaei group. The word Delostylis means "with a small but conspicuous style".

Based on morphology and molecular evidence, a few taxa in genus Trillium have been segregated into other genera:

- Trillium rivale, first described in 1885, was segregated into genus Pseudotrillium S.B.Farmer in 2002. The name Pseudotrillium rivale (S.Watson) S.B.Farmer is widely recognized.
- Trillium govanianum, first described in 1839, was segregated into genus Trillidium Kunth in 1850. However, the name Trillidium govanianum (Wall. ex D.Don) Kunth is not widely recognized.
- Trillium undulatum, first described in 1801, was segregated into genus Trillidium in 2018, but the name Trillidium undulatum (Willd.) Floden & E.E.Schill. is controversial and not widely recognized.

Phylogenetic analysis places Trillidium govanianum and Trillidium undulatum together in a clade with high support. However, since Trillium and Trillidium are both individually and collectively monophyletic, it is a matter of choice whether or not to recognize genus Trillidium.

Excluding the segregate taxa listed above, the remaining taxa separate into four clades with the following names:

- Trillium L. subgen. Trillium
- Trillium L. subgen. Callipetalon Lampley & E.E.Schill.
- Trillium L. subgen. Delostylis (Raf.) Raf. [as Delostylium]
- Trillium L. subgen. Sessilia Raf. [as Sessilium]

Traditionally, Trillium subgen. Trillium has included all pedicellate-flowered species (which is a paraphyletic group), but in 2022, the subgenus was circumscribed as a clade of fourteen (14) species. Its type species is Trillium erectum L. Historically, the subgenus has been known as the Erectum group.

Trillium subgen. Callipetalon was described by Jayne A. Lampley and Edward E. Schilling in 2022. The word Callipetalon means "beautiful petal", a reference to "the famously beautiful flowers" of its type species, Trillium grandiflorum (Michx.) Salisb. Historically, the subgenus has been known as the Grandiflorum group.

This leads to a four-part concept of Trillium that sharply contrasts with the traditional pedicellate vs. sessile dichotomy outlined previously.

=== Subgenus Trillium ===
Trillium subgen. Trillium, the Erectum group, is a group of pedicellate-flowered trilliums that includes Trillium erectum. The subgenus was circumscribed as a clade of fourteen (14) species in 2022. Species in this subgenus have pedicellate flowers (on a stalk) with three distinct stigmas (no style) and solid green leaves (not mottled). They are distributed across North America and Asia. Hybrids are common within this subgenus (the only group of pedicellate-flowered trilliums with natural hybrids).

- Trillium apetalon Makino – Japan, Kuril Islands, E Russia (Sakhalin)
- Trillium camschatcense Ker Gawl. – NE China (Jilin), Japan, Korea, Kuril Islands, E Russia (Primorsky Krai, Khabarovsk Krai, Kamchatka Peninsula, Sakhalin)
- Trillium cernuum L. – Manitoba, New Brunswick, Newfoundland, Nova Scotia, Ontario, Prince Edward Island, Quebec, Saskatchewan; Connecticut, Delaware, Illinois, Indiana, Iowa, Maine, Maryland, Massachusetts, Michigan, Minnesota, New Hampshire, New Jersey, New York, North Dakota, Ohio, Pennsylvania, Rhode Island, South Dakota, Vermont, Virginia, West Virginia, Wisconsin; Saint Pierre and Miquelon
- Trillium channellii Fukuda, J.D.Freeman & Itou – Japan (E Hokkaido)
- Trillium erectum L. – New Brunswick, Nova Scotia, Ontario, Quebec; Connecticut, Delaware, Georgia, Illinois, Indiana, Kentucky, Maine, Maryland, Massachusetts, Michigan, New Hampshire, New Jersey, New York, North Carolina, Ohio, Pennsylvania, Rhode Island, South Carolina, Tennessee, Vermont, Virginia, West Virginia
- Trillium flexipes Raf. – Ontario; Alabama, Arkansas, Delaware, Illinois, Indiana, Iowa, Kentucky, Maryland, Michigan, Minnesota, Missouri, New York, Ohio, Pennsylvania, South Dakota, Tennessee, Virginia, West Virginia, Wisconsin
- Trillium × hagae Miyabe & Tatew. (Trillium camschatcense × Trillium tschonoskii) – Japan, E Russia (S Sakhalin)
- Trillium hibbersonii (T.M.C.Taylor & Szczaw.) D.O'Neill & S.B.Farmer – British Columbia
- Trillium × komarovii H.Nakai & Koji Ito (Trillium camschatcense × unknown) – Japan, E Russia (Primorsky Krai)
- Trillium × miyabeanum Tatew. ex J.Samej. (Trillium apetalon × Trillium tschonoskii) – Japan
- Trillium rugelii Rendle – Alabama, Georgia, North Carolina, South Carolina, Tennessee
- Trillium simile Gleason – Georgia, North Carolina, Tennessee
- Trillium smallii Maxim. – Japan, E Russia (S Sakhalin)
- Trillium sulcatum T.S.Patrick – Alabama, Georgia, Kentucky, North Carolina, Tennessee, Virginia, West Virginia
- Trillium taiwanense S.S.Ying – E Taiwan
- Trillium tschonoskii Maxim. – Bhutan, China (Anhui, Fujian, Gansu, Hubei, Shaanxi, Sichuan, Tibet Autonomous Region, Yunnan, Zhejiang), NE India (Sikkim), Japan, Korea, Kuril Islands, Myanmar, Russia (Sakhalin), Taiwan
- Trillium vaseyi Harb. – Alabama, Georgia, North Carolina, South Carolina, Tennessee
- Trillium × yezoense Tatew. ex J.Samej. (Trillium apetalon × Trillium camschatcense) – Japan

=== Subgenus Callipetalon ===
Trillium subgen. Callipetalon, the Grandiflorum group, is a group of pedicellate-flowered trilliums that includes Trillium grandiflorum. The subgenus was circumscribed as a clade of three (3) species in 2022. Species in the subgenus have pedicellate flowers (on a stalk) and solid green leaves (except T. ovatum on the west coast of California, which occasionally has mottled leaves). The stigmas are fused together at their bases (basally connate) but lack a definite style. They are distributed across North America (but not Asia). Flowers were and still are consumed and used by indigenous peoples in various regions of North America.

- Trillium crassifolium Piper – Washington
- Trillium grandiflorum (Michx.) Salisb. – Nova Scotia, Ontario, Quebec; Alabama, Connecticut, Delaware, District of Columbia, Georgia, Illinois, Indiana, Iowa, Kentucky, Maine, Maryland, Massachusetts, Michigan, Minnesota, New Hampshire, New Jersey, New York, North Carolina, Ohio, Pennsylvania, South Carolina, Tennessee, Vermont, Virginia, West Virginia, Wisconsin
- Trillium nivale Riddell – Illinois, Indiana, Iowa, Kentucky, Maryland, Michigan, Minnesota, Missouri, Nebraska, Ohio, Pennsylvania, South Dakota, West Virginia, Wisconsin
- Trillium ovatum Pursh – Alberta, British Columbia; California, Colorado, Idaho, Montana, Oregon, Washington, Wyoming
- Trillium scouleri Rydb. ex Gleason – Alberta, British Columbia; Colorado, Idaho, Montana, Washington, Wyoming

=== Subgenus Delostylis ===
Trillium subgen. Delostylis, the Catesbaei group, is a group of pedicellate-flowered trilliums that includes Trillium catesbaei. The subgenus was circumscribed as a clade of seven (7) species in 2022. Species in this subgenus have pedicellate flowers (except for one variety of T. pusillum) with a definite style and solid green leaves (not mottled). Distribution is restricted to the southeastern and south central United States.

- Trillium catesbaei Elliott – Alabama, Georgia, North Carolina, South Carolina, Tennessee
- Trillium georgianum S.B.Farmer – Georgia
- Trillium persistens W.H.Duncan – Georgia, South Carolina
- Trillium pusillum Michx. – Alabama, Arkansas, Kentucky, Maryland, Mississippi, Missouri, North Carolina, Oklahoma, South Carolina, Tennessee, Virginia, West Virginia
- Trillium texanum Buckley – Arkansas, Louisiana, Texas

=== Subgenus Sessilia ===
Trillium subgen. Sessilia, the sessile-flowered trilliums, is a group of species that includes Trillium sessile. The subgenus was circumscribed as a clade of twenty-six (26) species in 2022. Species in this subgenus have sessile flowers (no flower stalk), erect petals (except in T. stamineum), and mottled leaves (except in T. petiolatum and occasionally in plants of other sessile-flowered species).

- Trillium albidum J.D.Freeman – California, Oregon, Washington
- Trillium angustipetalum (Torr.) J.D.Freeman – California
- Trillium chloropetalum (Torr.) Howell – California
- Trillium cuneatum Raf. – Alabama, Georgia, Kentucky, Mississippi, North Carolina, South Carolina, Tennessee
- Trillium decipiens J.D.Freeman – Alabama, Florida, Georgia
- Trillium decumbens Harb. – Alabama, Georgia, Tennessee
- Trillium delicatum Floden & E.E.Schill. – Georgia
- Trillium discolor Hook. – Georgia, North Carolina, South Carolina
- Trillium foetidissimum J.D.Freeman – Louisiana, Mississippi
- Trillium gracile J.D.Freeman – Louisiana, Texas
- Trillium kurabayashii J.D.Freeman – California, Oregon
- Trillium lancifolium Raf. – Alabama, Florida, Georgia, South Carolina, Tennessee
- Trillium ludovicianum Harb. – Louisiana, Mississippi, Texas
- Trillium luteum (Muhl.) Harb. – District of Columbia, Georgia, Kentucky, North Carolina, Tennessee
- Trillium maculatum Raf. – Alabama, Florida, Georgia, South Carolina
- Trillium oostingii Gaddy – South Carolina
- Trillium petiolatum Pursh – Idaho, Oregon, Washington
- Trillium recurvatum L.C.Beck – Alabama, Arkansas, Illinois, Indiana, Iowa, Kentucky, Louisiana, Michigan, Mississippi, Missouri, Ohio, Tennessee, Texas, Wisconsin
- Trillium reliquum J.D.Freeman – Georgia, South Carolina
- Trillium sessile L. – Alabama, Arkansas, District of Columbia, Illinois, Indiana, Kansas, Kentucky, Maryland, Michigan, Missouri, New York, North Carolina, Ohio, Oklahoma, Pennsylvania, Tennessee, Virginia, West Virginia
- Trillium stamineum Harb. – Alabama, Mississippi, Tennessee
- Trillium tennesseense E. E. Schill & Floden – Tennessee
- Trillium underwoodii Small – Alabama, Florida, Georgia
- Trillium viride L.C.Beck – Illinois, Missouri
- Trillium viridescens Nutt. – Arkansas, Kansas, Missouri, Oklahoma, Texas

=== Ungrouped taxa ===
The following pair of taxa do not fit into any of the above groups since they are markedly different from other Trillium species. There is evidence to support the segregation of these species into a separate genus (Trillidium) but the proposal is controversial.

- Trillium govanianum Wall. ex D.Don – NE Afghanistan, Bhutan, China (Tibet Autonomous Region, Yunnan), N + NE India (Himachal Pradesh, Jammu and Kashmir, Sikkim, Uttarakhand), Nepal, N Pakistan
- Trillium undulatum Willd. – New Brunswick, Nova Scotia, Ontario, Prince Edward Island, Quebec; Connecticut, Georgia, Kentucky, Maine, Maryland, Massachusetts, Michigan, New Hampshire, New Jersey, New York, North Carolina, Ohio, Pennsylvania, Rhode Island, South Carolina, Tennessee, Vermont, Virginia, West Virginia

=== Other taxa ===
As of April 2023, Plants of the World Online does not accept these taxa:

- Trillium parviflorum V.G.Soukup is an accepted name by some authorities while others regard this name as a synonym of T. albidum subsp. parviflorum (V.G.Soukup) K.L.Chambers & S.C.Meyers.

The following taxa are of historical interest:

- Trillium rivale S.Watson has been segregated to a monotypic genus as Pseudotrillium rivale (S.Watson) S.B.Farmer.
- Trillium × crockerianum Halda was originally described as a hybrid with parents Trillium ovatum and Trillium rivale, but since the latter is now a member of genus Pseudotrillium, the hybrid has become an undescribed intergeneric hybrid, and therefore its taxonomic placement is uncertain.

== Distribution ==
Trillium species are native to North America and Asia.

=== North America ===
More than three dozen Trillium species are found in North America, most of which are native to eastern North America. Just six species are native to western North America: T. albidum, T. angustipetalum, T. chloropetalum, T. kurabayashii, T. ovatum, and T. petiolatum. Of these, only T. ovatum is pedicellate-flowered.

==== Canada ====
Trillium species are found across Canada, from Newfoundland to southern British Columbia. The greatest diversity of species are found in Ontario, Quebec, and Nova Scotia.

- Alberta: T. ovatum, T. scouleri
- British Columbia: T. hibbersonii, T. ovatum, T. scouleri
- Manitoba: T. cernuum
- New Brunswick: T. cernuum, T. erectum, T. undulatum
- Newfoundland: T. cernuum
- Northwest Territories: none
- Nova Scotia: T. cernuum, T. erectum, T. grandiflorum, T. undulatum
- Nunavut: none
- Ontario: T. cernuum, T. erectum, T. flexipes, T. grandiflorum, T. undulatum
- Prince Edward Island: T. cernuum, T. undulatum
- Quebec: T. cernuum, T. erectum, T. grandiflorum, T. undulatum
- Saskatchewan: T. cernuum
- Yukon: none

==== United States ====
Except for the desert regions of the southwestern United States, Trillium species are found throughout the contiguous U.S. states. In the western United States, species are found from Washington to central California, east to the Rocky Mountains. In the eastern United States, species range from Maine to northern Florida, west to the Mississippi River valley. Trillium species are especially diverse in the southeastern United States, in Georgia, Tennessee, Alabama, North Carolina, and South Carolina. The state of Georgia is home to 21 species of trillium.

- Alabama: T. catesbaei, T. cuneatum, T. decipiens, T. decumbens, T. flexipes, T. grandiflorum, T. lancifolium, T. luteum, T. maculatum, T. pusillum, T. recurvatum, T. reliquum, T. rugelii, T. sessile, T. stamineum, T. sulcatum, T. underwoodii, T. vaseyi
- Alaska: none
- Arizona: none
- Arkansas: T. flexipes, T. pusillum, T. recurvatum, T. sessile, T. texanum, T. viridescens
- California: T. albidum, T. angustipetalum, T. chloropetalum, T. kurabayashii, T. ovatum
- Colorado: T. ovatum, T. scouleri
- Connecticut: T. cernuum, T. erectum, T. grandiflorum, T. undulatum
- Delaware: T. cernuum, T. erectum, T. flexipes, T. grandiflorum
- District of Columbia: T. grandiflorum, T. luteum, T. sessile
- Florida: T. decipiens, T. lancifolium, T. maculatum, T. underwoodii
- Georgia: T. catesbaei, T. cuneatum, T. decipiens, T. decumbens, T. delicatum, T. discolor, T. erectum, T. georgianum, T. grandiflorum, T. lancifolium, T. luteum, T. maculatum, T. persistens, T. reliquum, T. rugelii, T. simile, T. sulcatum, T. underwoodii, T. undulatum, T. vaseyi
- Hawaii: none
- Idaho: T. ovatum, T. petiolatum, T. scouleri
- Illinois: T. cernuum, T. erectum, T. flexipes, T. grandiflorum, T. nivale, T. recurvatum, T. sessile, T. viride
- Indiana: T. cernuum, T. erectum, T. flexipes, T. grandiflorum, T. nivale, T. recurvatum, T. sessile
- Iowa: T. cernuum, T. flexipes, T. grandiflorum, T. nivale, T. recurvatum
- Kansas: T. sessile, T. viridescens
- Kentucky: T. cuneatum, T. erectum, T. flexipes, T. grandiflorum, T. luteum, T. nivale, T. pusillum, T. recurvatum, T. sessile, T. sulcatum, T. undulatum
- Louisiana: T. foetidissimum, T. gracile, T. ludovicianum, T. recurvatum, T. texanum
- Maine: T. cernuum, T. erectum, T. grandiflorum, T. undulatum
- Maryland: T. cernuum, T. erectum, T. flexipes, T. grandiflorum, T. nivale, T. pusillum, T. sessile, T. undulatum
- Massachusetts: T. cernuum, T. erectum, T. grandiflorum, T. undulatum
- Michigan: T. cernuum, T. erectum, T. flexipes, T. grandiflorum, T. nivale, T. recurvatum, T. sessile, T. undulatum
- Minnesota: T. cernuum, T. flexipes, T. grandiflorum, T. nivale
- Mississippi: T. cuneatum, T. foetidissimum, T. ludovicianum, T. pusillum, T. recurvatum, T. stamineum
- Missouri: T. flexipes, T. nivale, T. pusillum, T. recurvatum, T. sessile, T. viride, T. viridescens
- Montana: T. ovatum, T. scouleri
- Nebraska: T. nivale
- Nevada: none
- New Hampshire: T. cernuum, T. erectum, T. grandiflorum, T. undulatum
- New Jersey: T. cernuum, T. erectum, T. grandiflorum, T. undulatum
- New Mexico: none
- New York: T. cernuum, T. erectum, T. flexipes, T. grandiflorum, T. sessile, T. undulatum
- North Carolina: T. catesbaei, T. cuneatum, T. discolor, T. erectum, T. grandiflorum, T. luteum, T. pusillum, T. rugelii, T. sessile, T. simile, T. sulcatum, T. undulatum, T. vaseyi
- North Dakota: T. cernuum
- Ohio: T. cernuum, T. erectum, T. flexipes, T. grandiflorum, T. nivale, T. recurvatum, T. sessile, T. undulatum
- Oklahoma: T. pusillum, T. sessile, T. viridescens
- Oregon: T. albidum, T. kurabayashii, T. ovatum, T. petiolatum
- Pennsylvania: T. cernuum, T. erectum, T. flexipes, T. grandiflorum, T. nivale, T. sessile, T. undulatum
- Rhode Island: T. cernuum, T. erectum, T. undulatum
- South Carolina: T. catesbaei, T. cuneatum, T. discolor, T. erectum, T. grandiflorum, T. lancifolium, T. maculatum, T. oostingii, T. persistens, T. pusillum, T. reliquum, T. rugelii, T. undulatum, T. vaseyi
- South Dakota: T. cernuum, T. flexipes, T. nivale
- Tennessee: T. catesbaei, T. cuneatum, T. decumbens, T. erectum, T. flexipes, T. grandiflorum, T. lancifolium, T. luteum, T. pusillum, T. recurvatum, T. rugelii, T. sessile, T. simile, T. stamineum, T. sulcatum, T. tennesseense, T. undulatum, T. vaseyi
- Texas: T. gracile, T. ludovicianum, T. recurvatum, T. texanum, T. viridescens
- Utah: none
- Vermont: T. cernuum, T. erectum, T. grandiflorum, T. undulatum
- Virginia: T. cernuum, T. erectum, T. flexipes, T. grandiflorum, T. pusillum, T. sessile, T. sulcatum, T. undulatum
- Washington: T. albidum, T. ovatum, T. petiolatum, T. scouleri
- West Virginia: T. cernuum, T. erectum, T. flexipes, T. grandiflorum, T. nivale, T. pusillum, T. sessile, T. sulcatum, T. undulatum
- Wisconsin: T. cernuum, T. flexipes, T. grandiflorum, T. nivale, T. recurvatum
- Wyoming: T. ovatum, T. scouleri

==== Other ====
- Saint Pierre and Miquelon: T. cernuum

=== Asia ===
In Asia, the range of Trillium species extends from the Himalayas across China, Korea, Japan, and eastern Russia to the Kuril Islands. The greatest diversity of Trillium species is found on the islands of Japan and Sakhalin.

- Afghanistan: T. govanianum
- Bhutan: T. govanianum, T. tschonoskii
- China: T. camschatcense (Jilin), T. govanianum (Tibet Autonomous Region, Yunnan), T. taiwanense (E Taiwan), T. tschonoskii (Anhui, Fujian, Gansu, Hubei, Shaanxi, Sichuan, Tibet Autonomous Region, Yunnan, Zhejiang)
- India: T. govanianum (Himachal Pradesh, Jammu and Kashmir, Sikkim, Uttarakhand), T. tschonoskii (Sikkim)
- Japan: T. apetalon, T. camschatcense, T. channellii (Hokkaido), T. × hagae, T. × komarovii, T. × miyabeanum, T. smallii, T. tschonoskii, T. × yezoense
- Korea: T. camschatcense, T. tschonoskii
- Kuril Islands: T. apetalon, T. camschatcense, T. tschonoskii
- Myanmar: T. tschonoskii
- Nepal: T. govanianum
- Pakistan: T. govanianum
- Russia: T. apetalon (Sakhalin), T. camschatcense (Primorsky Krai, Khabarovsk Krai, Kamchatka Peninsula, Sakhalin), T. × hagae (Sakhalin), T. × komarovii (Primorsky Krai), T. smallii (Sakhalin), T. tschonoskii (Sakhalin)
- Taiwan: T. taiwanense, T. tschonoskii

== Identification ==
A fully general dichotomous key requires a mature, flowering plant. The first step is to determine whether or not the flower sits on a pedicel, which determines the subgenus. (Any mature plant may be identified to this extent, even if it is not in bloom.) Identification proceeds based on flower parts, leaves, and other characteristics. A combination of characteristics is usually required to identify the plant.

Identification of a non-flowering, non-fruiting plant with bare leaves may be difficult. Although some species of Trillium have petioles (leaf stalks) and/or distinctive leaf shapes, these features are seldom sufficient to identify the plant down to the species level.

In eastern North America, jack-in-the-pulpit (Arisaema triphyllum) is often mistaken for bare-leaved Trillium. Both species are about the same height with trifoliate leaves but the former lacks 3-way rotational symmetry and has leaf veins unlike those of Trillium.

== Ecology ==
Trilliums are myrmecochorous, that is, ants act as agents of seed dispersal. Each seed of a ripe fruit has a white fleshy appendage called an elaiosome. Ants are attracted to the elaiosome, so much so they often bore holes into the fruit instead of waiting for it to drop off on its own. The ants carry the seeds back to their nest where they eat the elaiosomes and discard the seeds. Here the seeds eventually germinate, an average of about 1 meter away from the parent plant.

For example, the seeds of Trillium camschatcense and T. tschonoskii are collected by ant species Aphaenogaster smythiesi and Myrmica ruginodis. Sometimes beetles interfere with the dispersal process by eating the elaiosomes, which makes the seeds less attractive to ants.

Yellow jackets (Vespula spp.) and other wasps are similarly attracted to elaiosomes. The wasps carry off the seeds and feed on the elaiosomes an average of about 1.4 meters away from the parent plant. Yellow jackets are documented seed dispersers for at least three species of Trillium (T. catesbaei, T. cuneatum, T. undulatum).

The seeds of some Trillium species are more attractive to ants than others. Widely distributed species (e.g., Trillium grandiflorum, Trillium catesbaei, and Trillium cuneatum) are more attractive to ants than narrowly endemic species (e.g., Trillium lancifolium, Trillium discolor, and Trillium decumbens).

=== Hybrids ===
As of February 2022, Plants of the World Online recognizes five named hybrids, four in Asia and one in North America. Three of the Asian hybrids, T. × hagae, T. × miyabeanum, and T. × yezoense, are well studied, but little is known about the Asian hybrid T. × komarovii. One of its parents is T. camschatcense but the other parent is unknown.

The only named hybrid in North America is T. × crockerianum whose type specimen was collected in Del Norte County, California. As originally described, its parents are Trillium ovatum and Trillium rivale, but the latter species is now a member of genus Pseudotrillium, and so T. × crockerianum has become an intergeneric hybrid.

In 1982, Haga and Channell crossed the Asiatic species Trillium camschatcense with several North American species. Of those, the crosses with T. erectum, T. flexipes, and T. vaseyi produced solid, seemingly viable seed. Seeds of the cross between T. camschatcense and T. erectum flowered in 9 to 10 years.

=== Disease ===
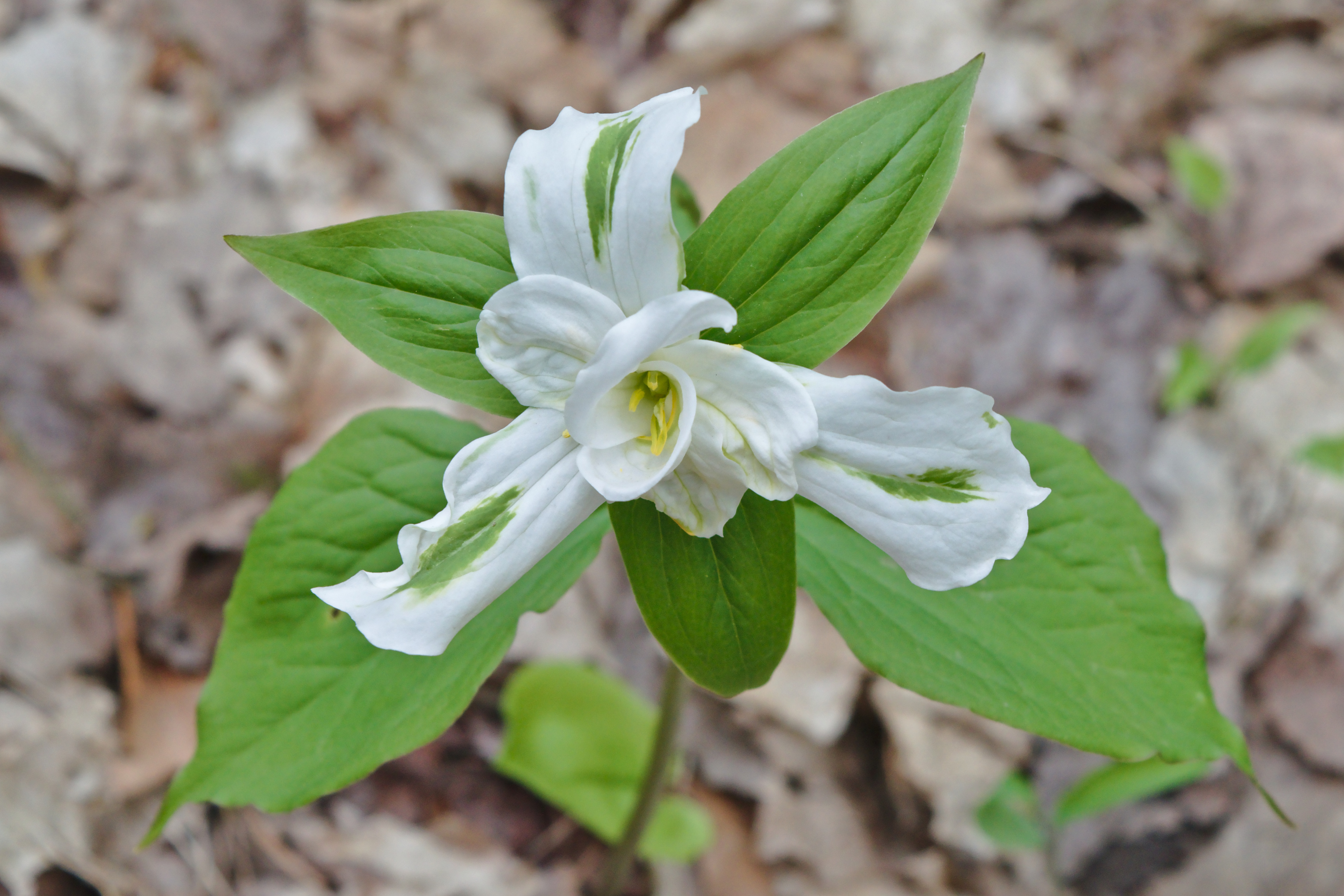
Diseased T. grandiflorum with virescent petals, extra petals, and other abnormalities

Various Trillium species are susceptible to a greening disorder caused by bacterial organisms called phytoplasmas that alter the morphology of infected plants. Symptoms of phytoplasma infection include abnormal green markings on the petals (floral virescence), extra leaves (phyllody), and other abnormal characteristics. Infected populations occur throughout the species range but are prevalent in Ontario, Michigan, and New York.

For many years, this condition was thought to originate from mutation, and so many of these forms were given taxonomic names now known to be invalid. In 1971, Hooper, Case, and Meyers used electron microscopy to detect the presence of mycoplasma-like organisms (i.e., phytoplasmas) in T. grandiflorum with virescent petals. The means of transmission was not established but leafhoppers were suspected. As of November 2021, the insect vector for Trillium greening disorder is unknown.

Phytoplasmas were positively identified in T. grandiflorum and T. erectum in Ontario in 2016. Phylogenetic analysis supported the grouping of the phytoplasmas isolated from infected plants as a related strain of 'Candidatus Phytoplasma pruni' (subgroup 16SrIII-F) with 99% sequence identity. This subgroup of phytoplasmas is associated with various other diseases, including milkweed yellows, Vaccinium witches' broom, and potato purple top.

== Conservation ==
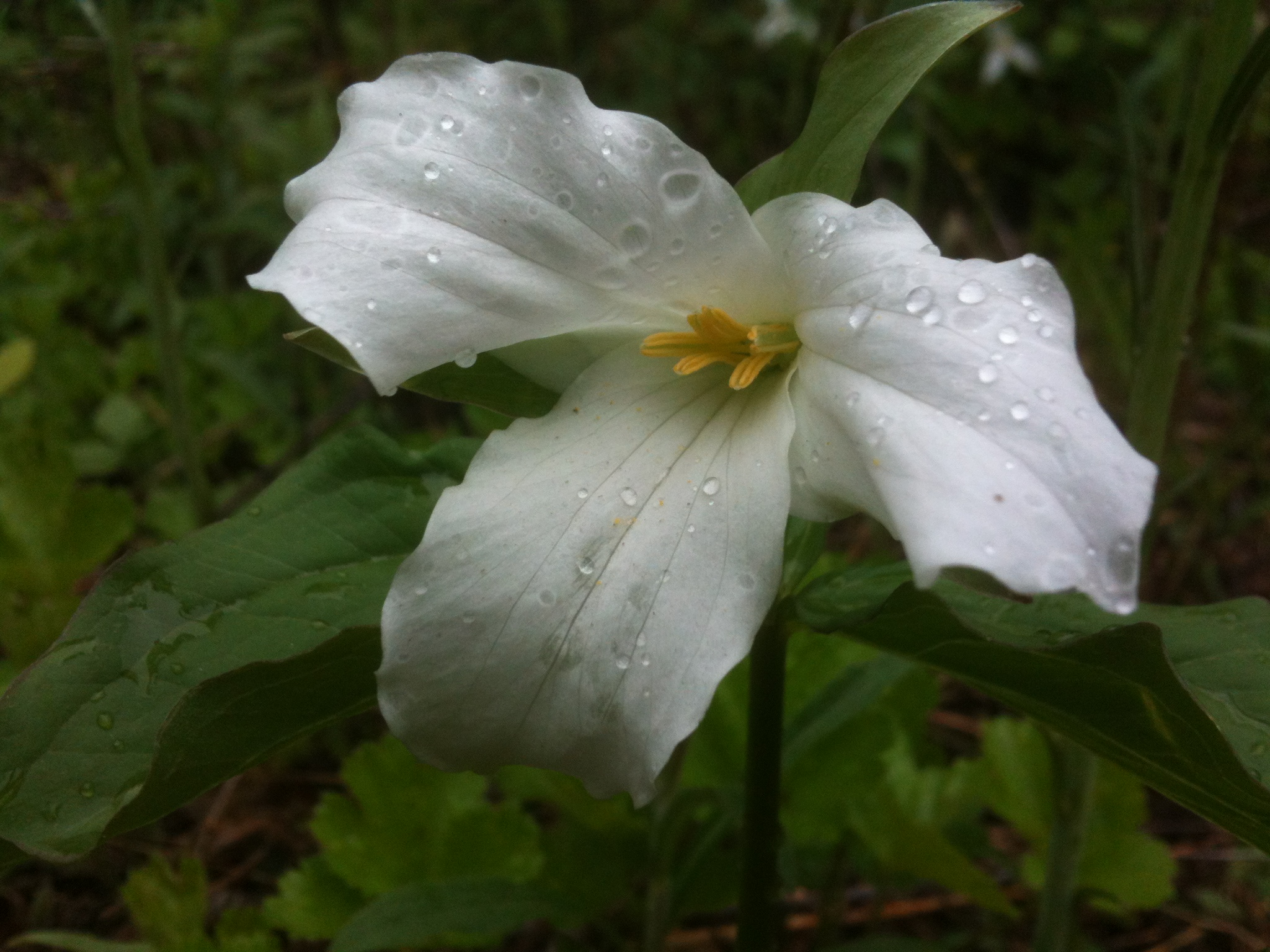
Trillium grandiflorum (great white trillium)

Picking parts off a trillium plant can kill it even if the rhizome is left undisturbed. Some species of trillium are listed as threatened or endangered and collecting these species may be illegal. Laws in some jurisdictions may restrict the commercial exploitation of trilliums and prohibit collection without the landowner's permission. In the US states of Michigan and Minnesota it is illegal to pick trilliums. In New York it is illegal to pick the red trillium.

In 2009, the Ontario Trillium Protection Act, a Private Members Bill, was proposed in the Ontario legislature that would have made it illegal to in any way injure the common Trillium grandiflorum (white trillium) in the province (with some exceptions), however the bill was never passed. The rare Trillium flexipes (drooping trillium) is also protected by law in Ontario, because of its decreasing Canadian population.

High white-tailed deer population density has been shown to decrease or eliminate trillium in an area, particularly white trillium. As such height of trillium can be used as an indicator for white-tailed deer population density within forested and urban areas to help forest regeneration.

Some species are harvested from the wild to an unsustainable degree. This is particularly dire in the case of T. govanianum, whose high selling price as a folk medicine has motivated harvesters to destroy swathes of ecologically sensitive Himalayan forests, causing mudslides.

== Medicinal uses ==
Several species contain sapogenins. They have been used traditionally as uterine stimulants, the inspiration for the common name birthwort. In a 1918 publication, Joseph E. Meyer called it "beth root", probably a corruption of "birthroot". He claimed that an astringent tonic derived from the root was useful in controlling bleeding and diarrhea.

== Culture ==
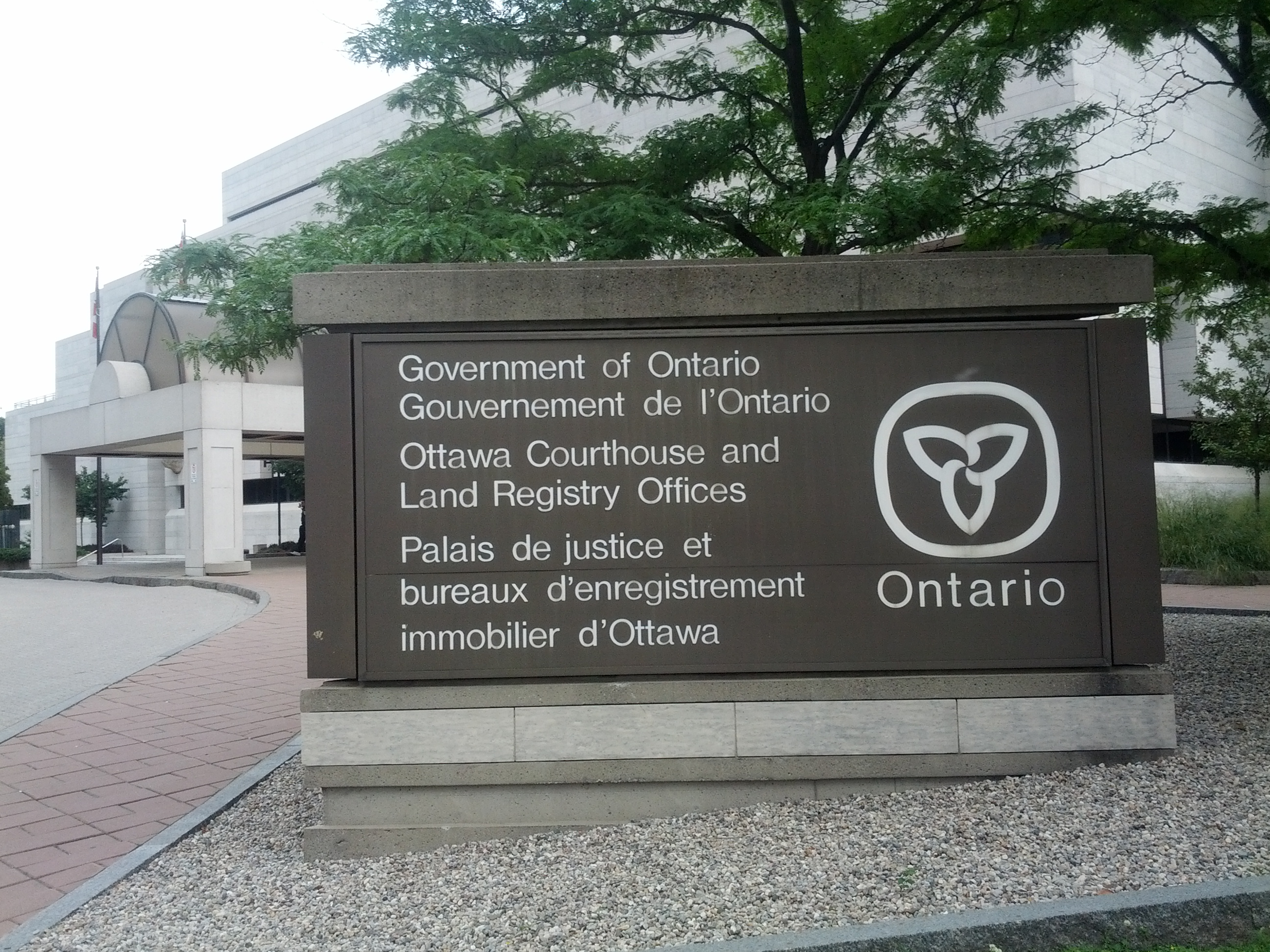
Ontario trillium emblem on an Ottawa courthouse sign.

The white trillium (Trillium grandiflorum) serves as the official flower and emblem of the Canadian province of Ontario. It is an official symbol of the Government of Ontario. The large white trillium is the official wildflower of Ohio. In light of their shared connection to the flower, the Major League Soccer teams in Toronto and Columbus compete with each other for the Trillium Cup.

Citizen scientists regularly report observations of Trillium species from around the world. T. grandiflorum, T. erectum, and T. ovatum (in that order) are the most often observed Trillium species.

Trillium is the literary magazine of Ramapo College of New Jersey, which features poetry, fiction, photography, and other visual arts created by Ramapo students.

In 1999, Michael Page established the use of the trillium flower as a symbol of bisexuality. This was a pun, as scientists had used the term "bisexual" to refer to the flower because such flowers have both male and female reproductive organs.

== Gallery ==
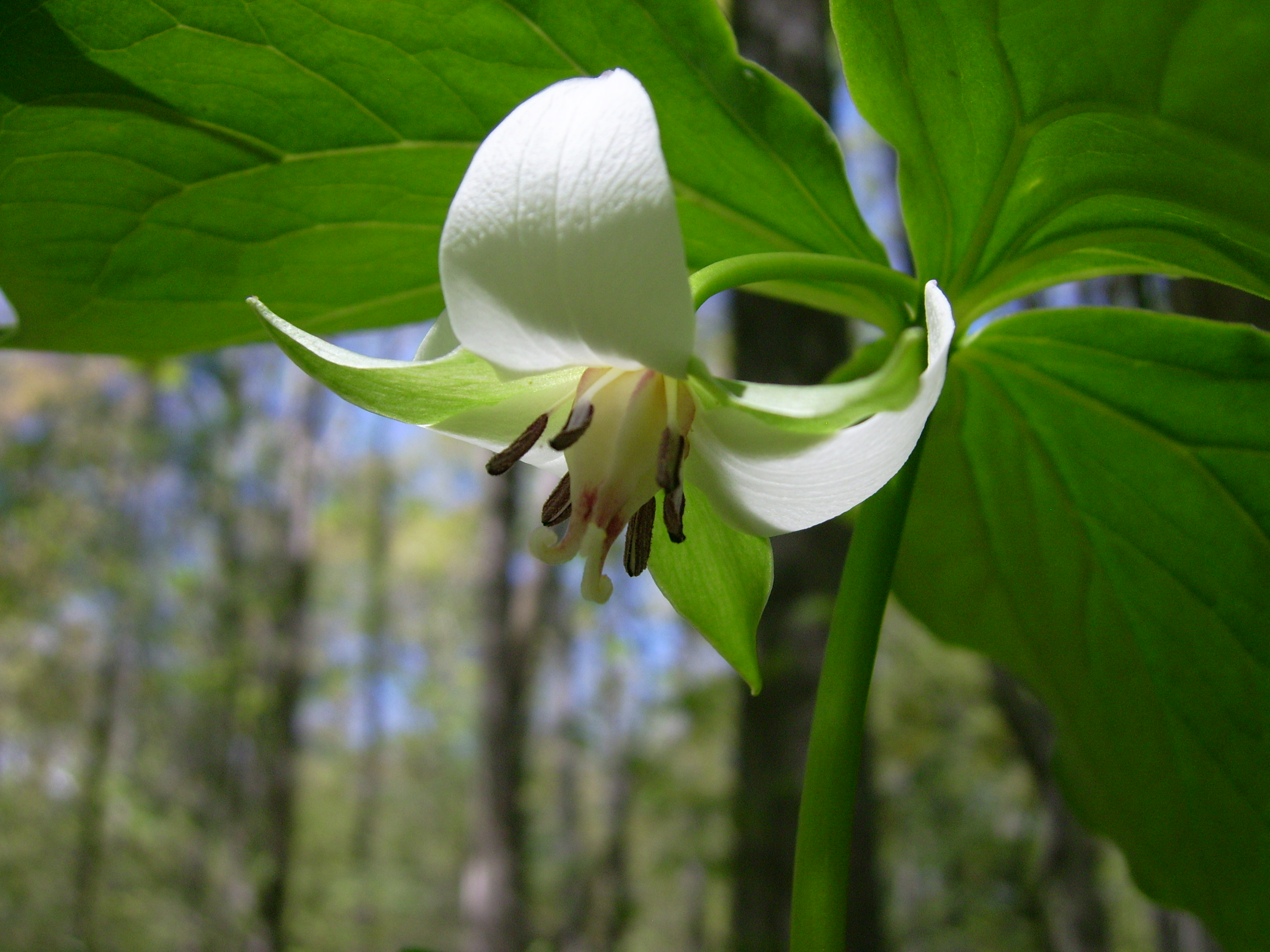
Nodding trillium (Trillium cernuum)

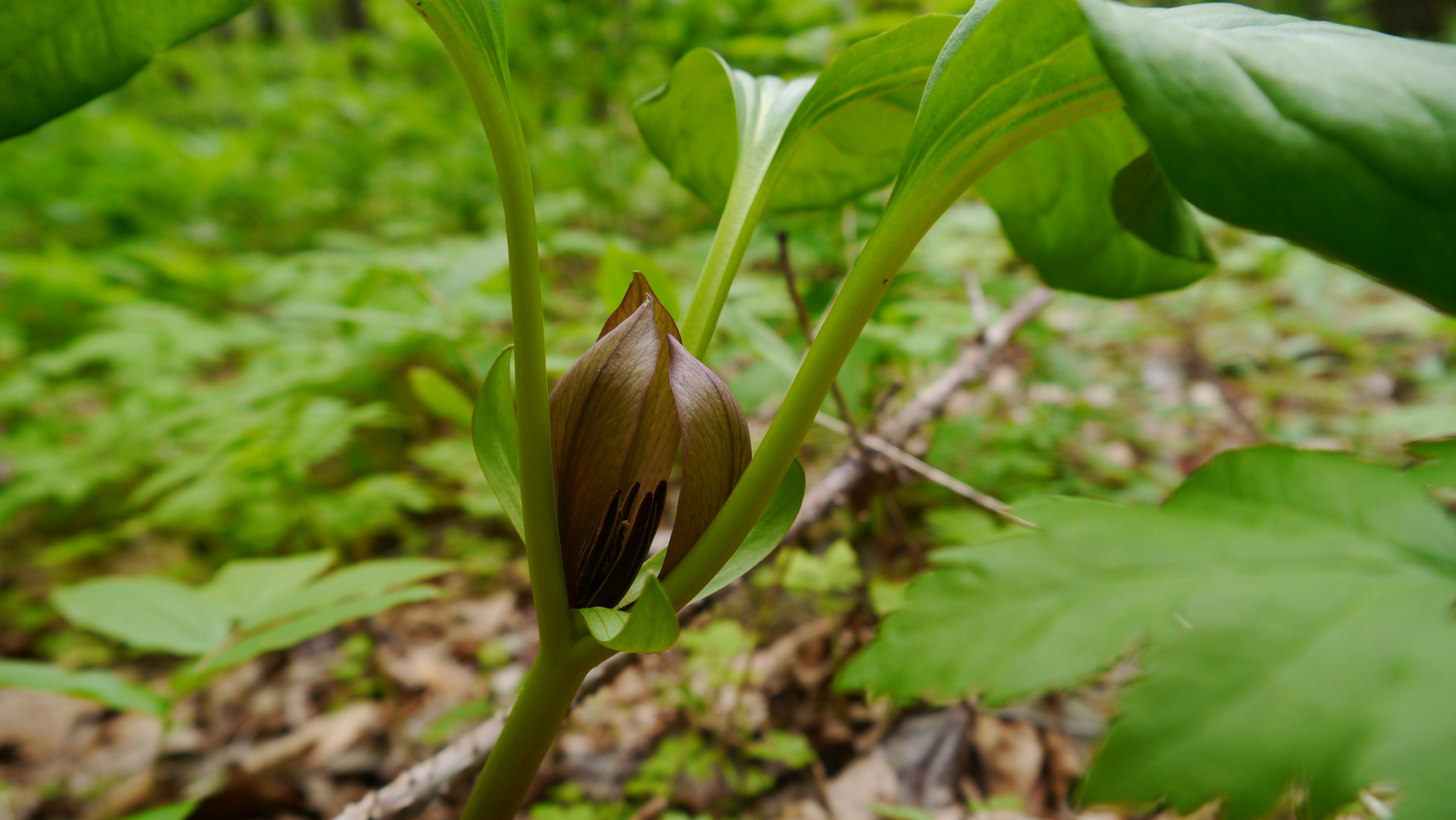
Idaho trillium (Trillium petiolatum)

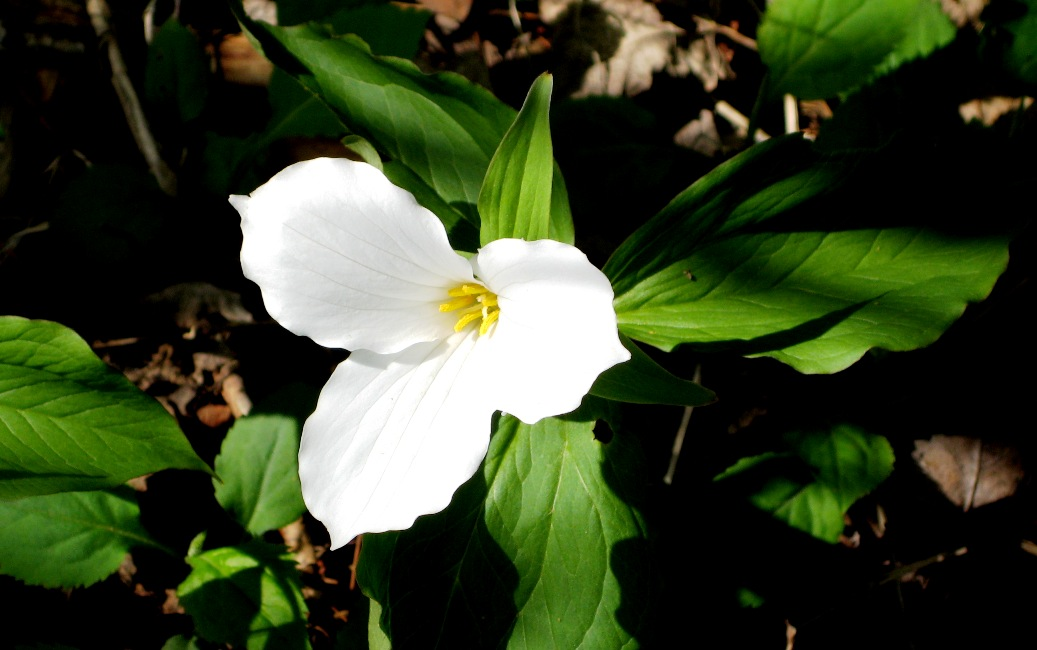
White trillium (Trillium grandiflorum)

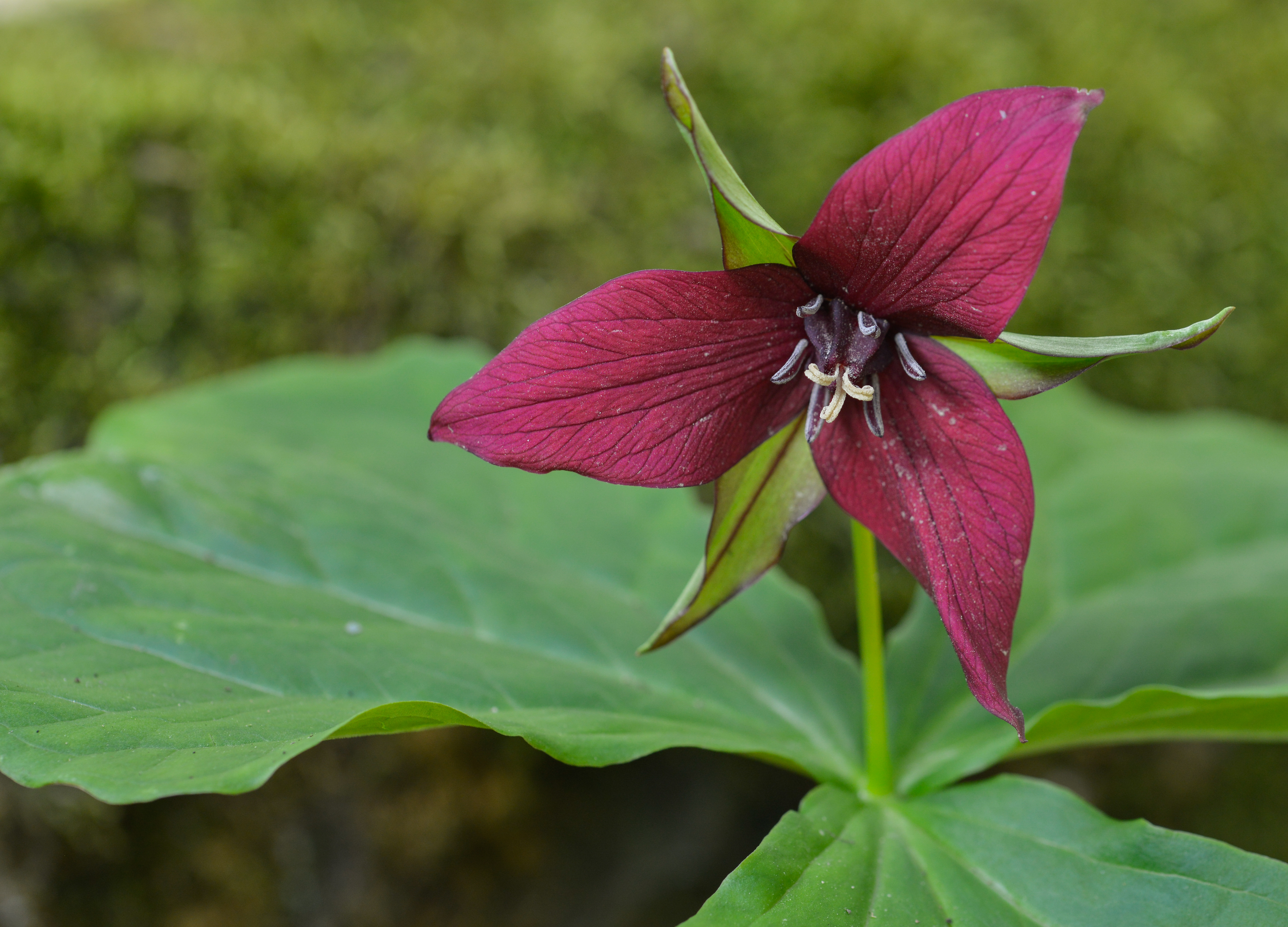
Red trillium (Trillium erectum)

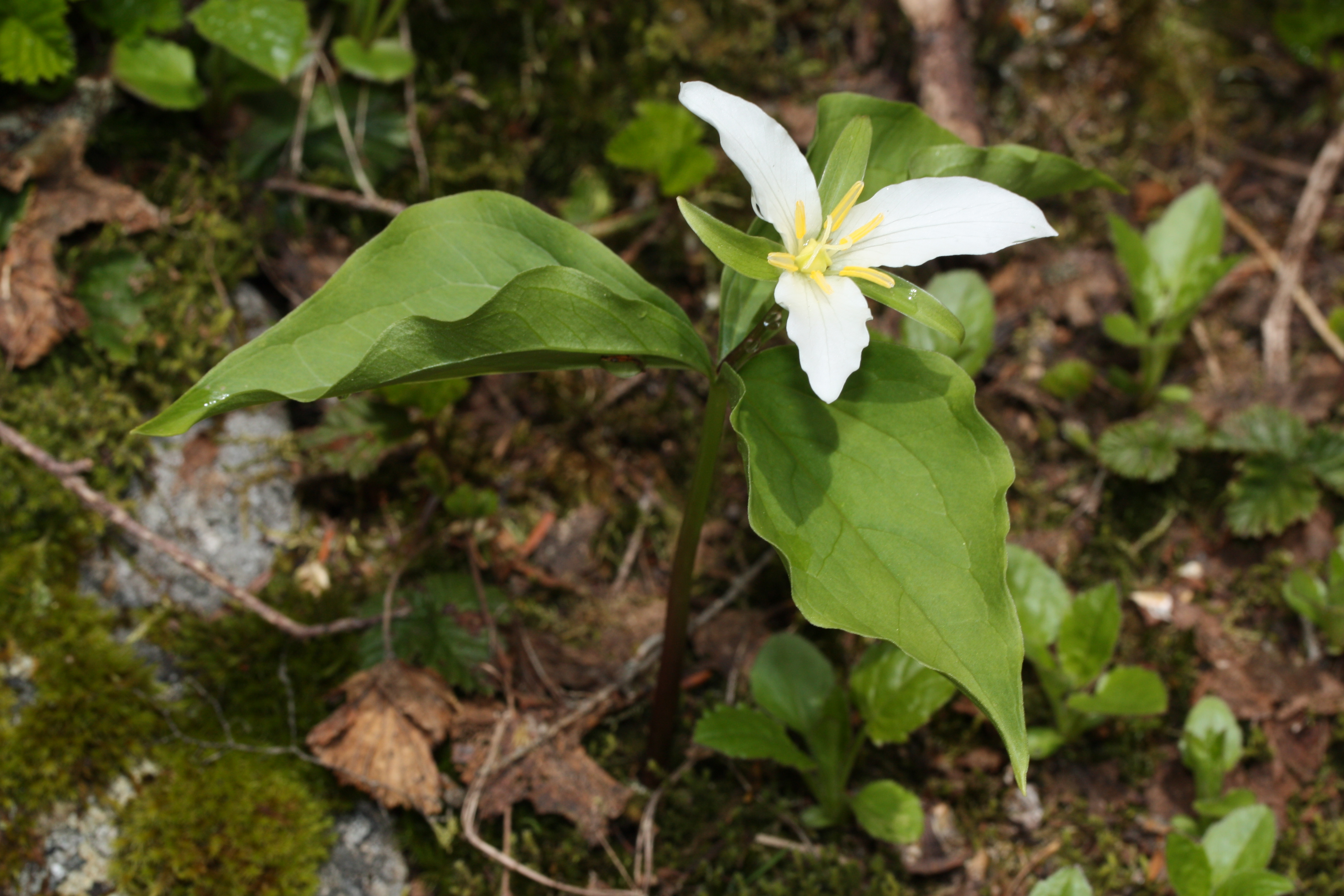
Pacific trillium (Trillium ovatum)

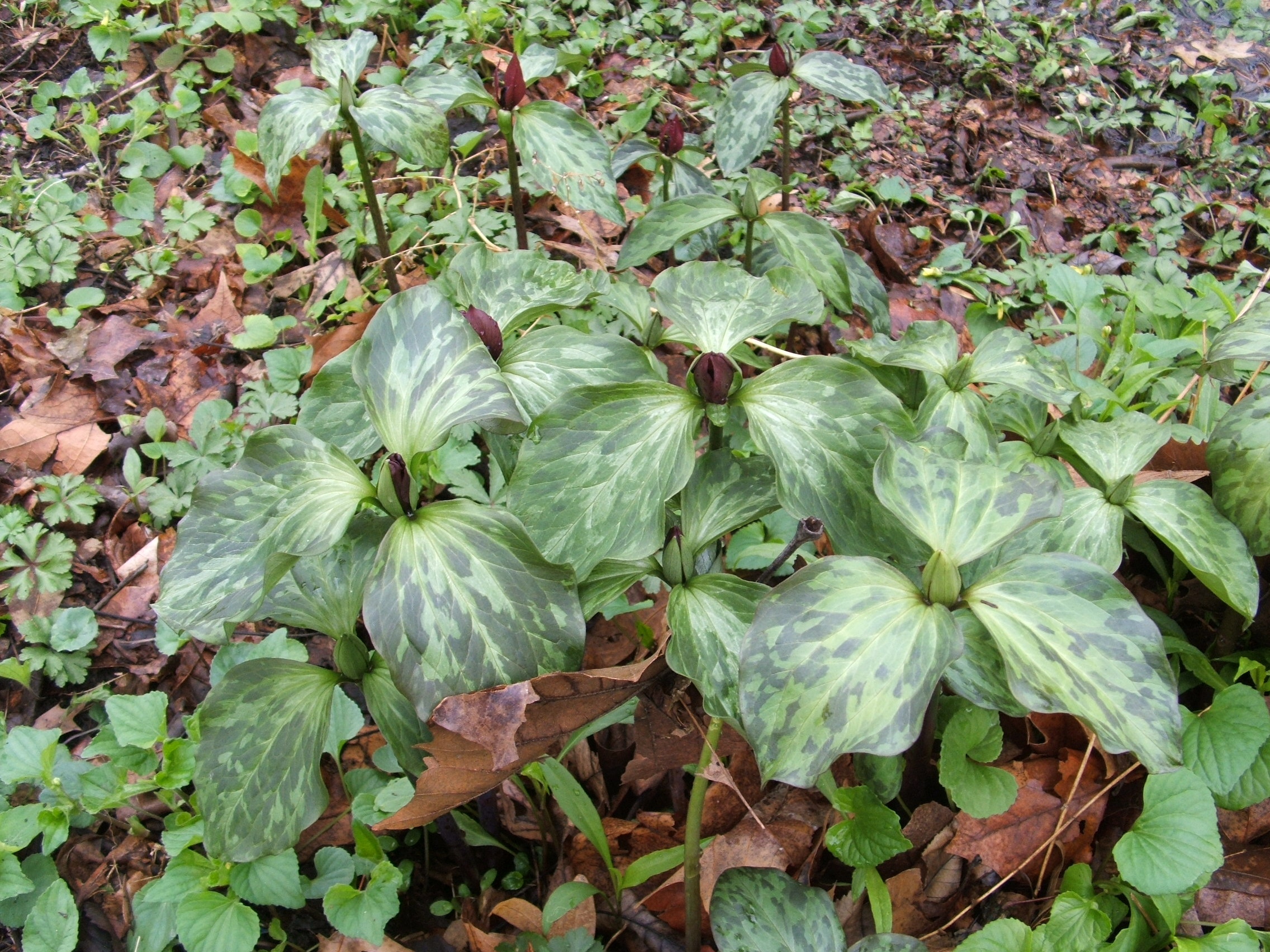
Prairie trillium (Trillium recurvatum)

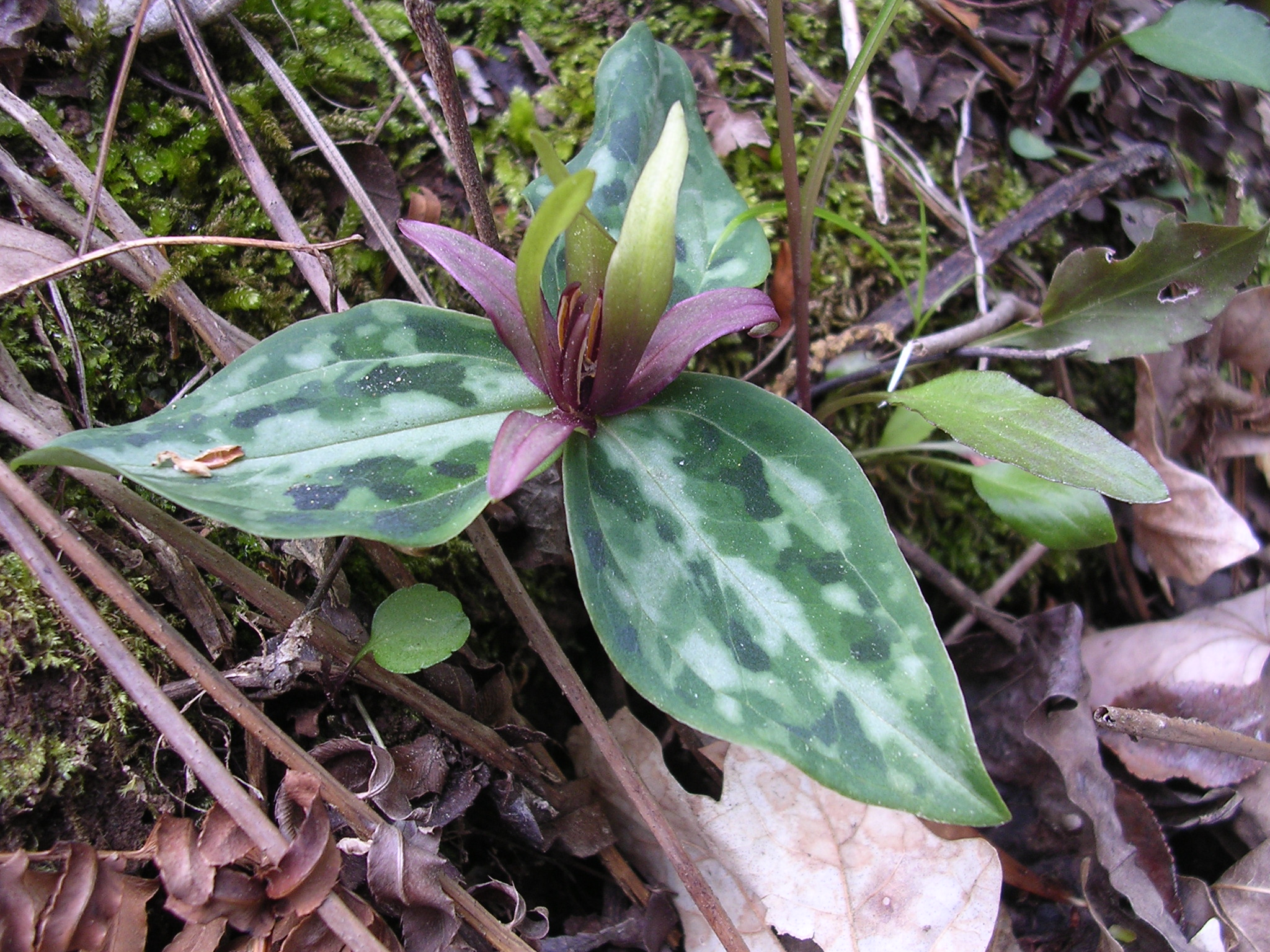
Relict trillium (Trillium reliquum) an endangered species

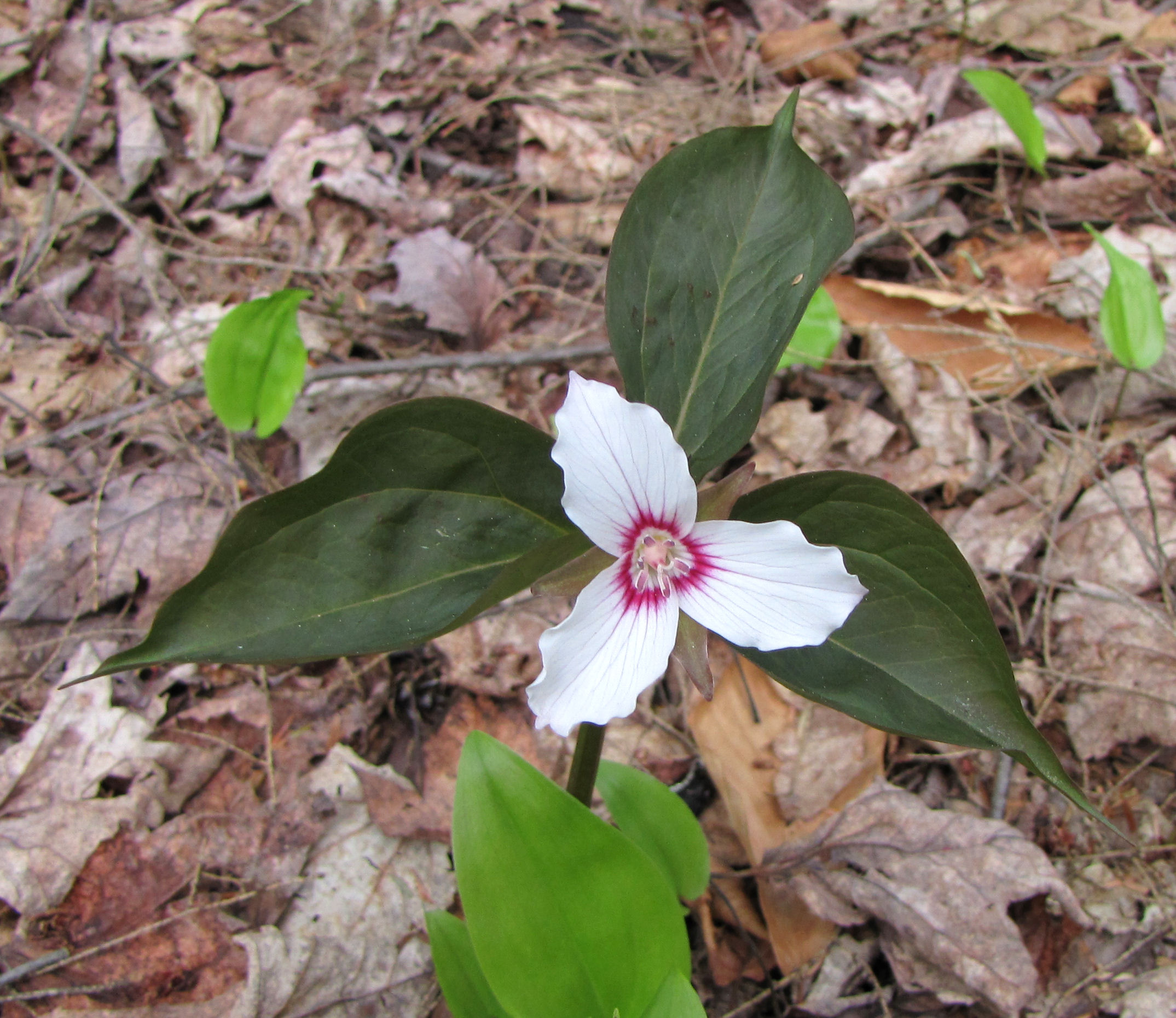
Painted trillium (Trillium undulatum)

== Bibliography ==
- Barksdale, Lane (1938). "The pedicellate species of Trillium found in the southern Appalachians". Journal of the Elisha Mitchell Scientific Society. 54 (2): 271–296. JSTOR 24332541.
- Case, Frederick W.; Case, Roberta B. (1997). Trilliums. Portland, Oregon: Timber Press. ISBN 978-0-88192-374-2.
- Farmer, Susan B. (2007). A Systematic Study of Trillium subgenus Delostylis (PhD). University of Tennessee.
- Floden, Aaron; Knapp, Wesley (June 2023). "Typification of the North American species of Trillium subg. Trillium (Melanthiaceae: Parideae)". Phytotaxa. 599 (3): 193–200. Bibcode:2023Phytx.599..193F. doi:10.11646/phytotaxa.599.3.6.
- Freeman, J. D. (1975). "Revision of Trillium subgenus Phyllantherum (Liliaceae)". Brittonia. 27 (1): 1–62. Bibcode:1975Britt..27....1F. doi:10.2307/2805646. JSTOR 2805646. S2CID 20824379.
- Gleason, Henry Allan (July 1906). "The pedunculate species of Trillium". Bulletin of the Torrey Botanical Club. 33 (7): 387–396. doi:10.2307/2478819. hdl:2027/hvd.32044106472392. JSTOR 2478819.
- Gledhill, David (2008). The Names of Plants (4th ed.). Cambridge University Press. ISBN 978-0-521-86645-3.
- Lampley, Jayne A. (2021). A systematic and biogeographic study of Trillium (Melanthiaceae) (PhD). University of Tennessee.
- Lampley, Jayne A.; Gereau, Roy; Floden, Aaron; Schilling, Edward E. (5 July 2022). "A revised subgeneric classification of Trillium (Parideae, Melanthiaceae)". Phytotaxa. 552 (5): 278–286. Bibcode:2022Phytx.552..278L. doi:10.11646/phytotaxa.552.5.1. S2CID 250368253.
- Meredith, Clayton; Frances, Anne; Highland, Amy; Oliver, Leah; Floden, Aaron; Gaddy, L.L.; Knapp, Wesley; Leaman, Danna; Leopold, Susan; Littlefield, Tara; Raguso, Robert; Schilling, Edward; Schotz, Alfred; Walker, Anna; Wayman, Kjirsten (2022). The Conservation Status of Trillium in North America. Hockessin, DE and Albuquerque, NM: Mt. Cuba Center, and New Mexico BioPark Society. ISBN 979-8-9850471-0-3.
- Patrick, Thomas S. (August 1986), The trilliums of eastern North America (mimeographed handout), Knoxville: University of Tennessee, pp. 1–7
- Spaulding, Daniel D.; Kartesz, John T.; Horne, Howard E.; Finzel, Brian J.; England, J. Kevin (2021). "Flora of Northern Alabama, part 5: Liliaceous Families" (PDF). Phytoneuron. 2021–30: 1–262. ISSN 2153-733X.
- Wayman, Kjirsten A.; Reilly, Matthew J.; Petlewski, Alaina R. (December 2023). "Taxonomic insights from floral scents of western North American sessile-flowered Trillium". American Journal of Botany. 110 (12) e16255. Bibcode:2023AmJB..11016255W. doi:10.1002/ajb2.16255. PMID 37938811.
- Weakley, Alan S. (2020). "Flora of the southeastern United States". University of North Carolina Herbarium, North Carolina Botanical Garden.
