= Trillium govanianum =

Conservation status
- Endangered (IUCN 3.1)

Scientific classification
- Kingdom: Plantae
- Clade: Embryophytes
- Clade: Tracheophytes
- Clade: Spermatophytes
- Clade: Angiosperms
- Clade: Monocots
- Order: Liliales
- Family: Melanthiaceae
- Genus: Trillium
- Species: T. govanianum

Binomial name
- Trillium govanianum Wall. ex D.Don

Synonyms
- Trillidium govanianum (Wall. ex D.Don) Kunth

Species of flowering plant

Trillium govanianum (Hindi name: nag chhatri) is a high-value medicinal herb belonging to the family Melanthiaceae and is mainly distributed from Pakistan to Bhutan between the altitudinal ranges of 2500–4000 metres above sea level across the Himalayan region. It is a native species of the Himalayas, usually preferring shady areas in the forest for its profuse growth.

The plant is a small herb and can be identified by its three leaves in one whorl at the summit of the stem and a solitary, purple flower in the centre. Leaves are broadly ovate, acute and conspicuously stalked.

Overexploitation and uprooting of this medicinal plant from natural habitat, to meet pharmaceutical industry demands has made the made a global threat to the population of nag chhatri with the small geographical niche. The rhizome part of T. govanianum has a high amount of steroidal saponins such as borassoside E and upon hydrolysis yield >2.5% diosgenin which is used for the preparation of steroidal and sex hormones.

Researchers from CSIR-IHBT, Palampur, India working on the T. govanianum to decipher its chemical constituents, genetic composition and vegetative propagation methods. Moreover, only 13 phytoconstituents were isolated from the rhizome part of T. govanianum, including 10 steroidal saponins, two phytoecdysteroids, and one trihydrylated fatty acid. Apart from that approximately, 24 steroidal saponins in parent extract and nine hydrophilic compounds in n-Hexane fraction were tentatively identified in T. govanianum by UPLC-ESI-MS/MS and GC/MS respectively. The extract Fractions and isolated steroidal saponins from T. govanianum have exhibited insecticidal, pro-diabetic enzymes inhibition, and anti-inflammatory activity.

The government of Himachal Pradesh, J&K, are taking crucial steps to stop the illegal trade of Trillium and there are also many police cases behind its large collection and transportation from one place to other.
