= Trillium channellii =

Scientific classification
- Kingdom: Plantae
- Clade: Tracheophytes
- Clade: Angiosperms
- Clade: Monocots
- Order: Liliales
- Family: Melanthiaceae
- Genus: Trillium
- Species: T. channellii

Binomial name
- Trillium channellii I. Fukuda, J.D. Freeman & Itou

Species of flowering plant

Trillium channellii is a plant species endemic to the island of Hokkaido in northern Japan. It is named in honor of Robert B. Channell of Vanderbilt University in Nashville, USA. The plant has been listed as endangered by the National Museum of Nature and Science (Tokyo).

Trillium channellii is a perennial herb spreading by means of underground rhizomes. Aerial shoots reach up to 50 cm tall. Leaves are broadly elliptic, wider than long, up to 12 cm long and 14 cm wide. Flowers are white, about 90 mm in diameter. Chromosome number: 2n (4x) = 20.
