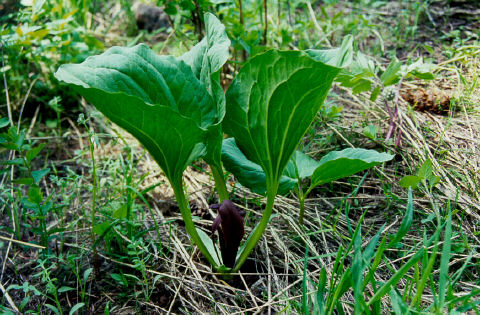

Conservation status
- Apparently Secure (NatureServe)

Scientific classification
- Kingdom: Plantae
- Clade: Tracheophytes
- Clade: Angiosperms
- Clade: Monocots
- Order: Liliales
- Family: Melanthiaceae
- Genus: Trillium
- Species: T. petiolatum

Binomial name
- Trillium petiolatum Pursh

Synonyms
- Trillium petiolatum f. luteum V.G.Soukup

= Trillium petiolatum =

Species of flowering plant

Trillium petiolatum, the Idaho trillium, also known as the long-petioled trillium or round-leaved trillium, is a species of flowering plant in the family Melanthiaceae. It is native to the northwestern United States, in Idaho, Oregon, and Washington. Its type specimen was gathered by Meriwether Lewis during the return trip of the Lewis and Clark Expedition in 1806.

== Description ==
Trillium petiolatum is "without question the least Trillium-like of all trilliums." The specific epithet petiolatum, meaning "petioled," is intended to draw attention to its very long petioles, which are 5 to 12 cm (2 to 5 in) long. The petioles are nearly as long as the leaf blades, which themselves are 7 to 14 cm (3 to 6 in) long and 5.5 to 10.2 cm (2 to 4 in) wide. The round-ovate blades are green but not mottled. The petiolate leaves strongly resemble the leaves of the common plantain. Pursh himself observed that T. petiolatum "has leaves very much like Plantago major."

The scape is 4 to 17 cm (2 to 7 in) long but most of it remains below the surface since the rhizome is deep underground, presumably for protection. Consequently the leaf-whorl and the sessile flower sit at or near ground level. The flower is small, with sepals from 22 to 47 mm (0.87 to 1.85 in) long and 7 to 10 mm (0.28 to 0.39 in) wide and petals from 30 to 55 mm (1.2 to 2.2 in) long and 4 to 10 mm (0.16 to 0.39 in) wide. The petals are red, maroon, or purple, but yellow-flowered forms devoid of purple pigments have been identified. Due to its small size and uncharacteristic leaf structure (for a trillium), the plant is inconspicuous and easily overlooked.

Trillium petiolatum shows similarities to both T. sessile and T. recurvatum. Of the sessile trilliums, only T. recurvatum and T. petiolatum have petiolate leaves, but apart from this, the two species have little else in common. Based on flower parts and reproductive organs, T. petiolatum appears to be more closely related to T. sessile.

== Taxonomy ==
Trillium petiolatum was first described by the German–American botanist Frederick Traugott Pursh in 1813. The type specimen for this species was gathered by Meriwether Lewis along the Clearwater River (originally called Koos-Koos-Kai-Kai by the Nez Perce people) during the return trip of the Lewis and Clark Expedition in 1806.

== Distribution ==
Trillium petiolatum is native to the mountainous areas of the northwestern United States, in Idaho, Oregon, and Washington.

== Ecology ==
Trillium petiolatum flowers very early April to late May (depending upon conditions and elevation) but it may bloom earlier upon south-facing slopes. It occurs at elevations from 400 to 1,400 m (1,300 to 4,600 ft), above stream beds, under scrub brush, and near the edges of coniferous and deciduous forests. No other Trillium species survives in such harsh conditions. Only the habitat of Pseudotrillium rivale, a close relative, approaches the habitat of T. petiolatum in terms of exposure, openness, and seasonal dryness. Like T. ovatum, T. petiolatum does not do well in eastern gardens.

Like other Trillium species, T. petiolatum has a one-leaf vegetative stage followed by a three-leaf vegetative (juvenile) stage. After several years of vegetative growth, the plant finally reaches its three-leaf reproductive (flowering) stage. It has an indefinite life span of many years.

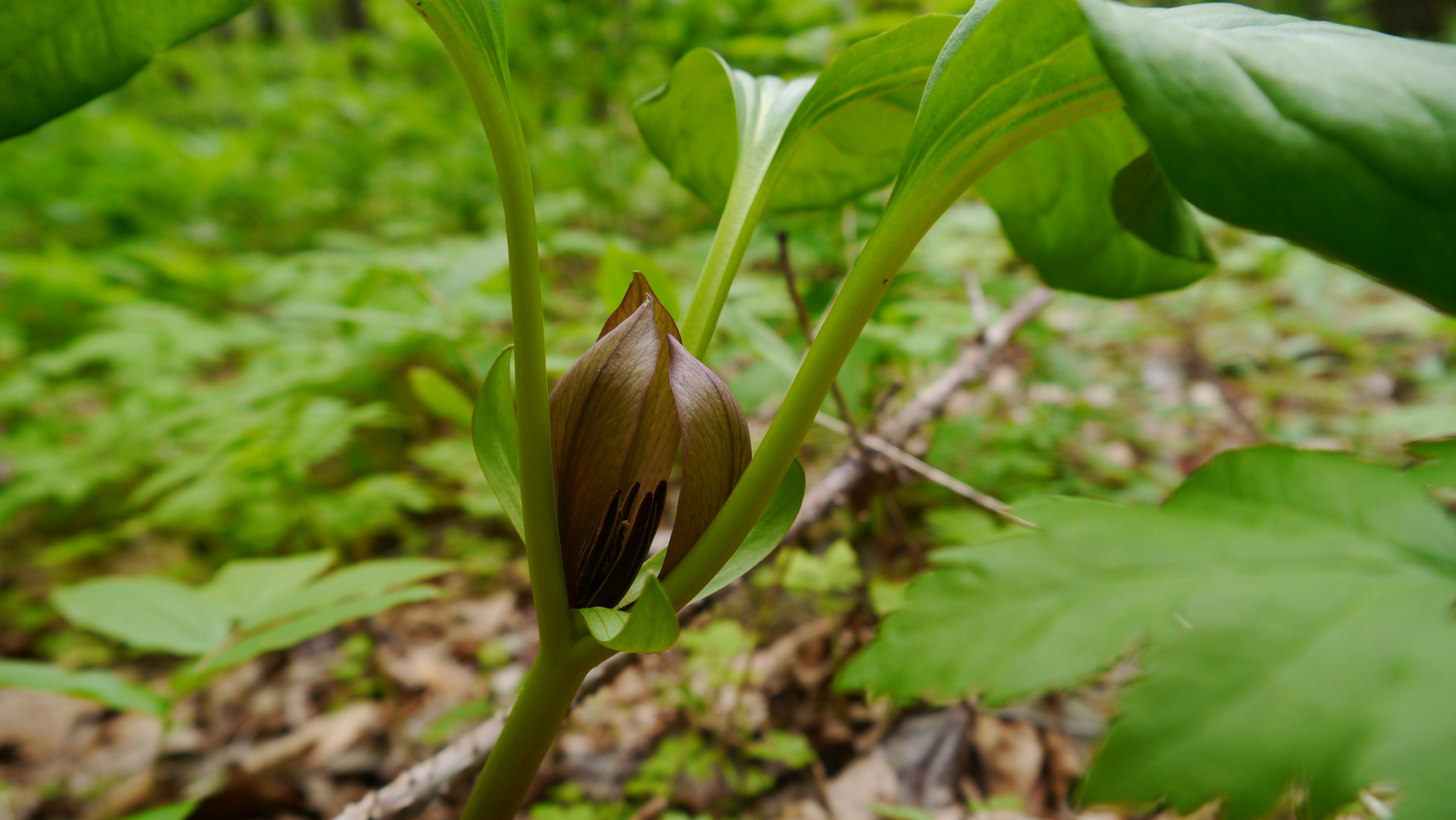
Trillium petiolatum

== Bibliography ==
- Case, Frederick W.; Case, Roberta B. (1997). Trilliums. Portland, Oregon: Timber Press. ISBN 978-0-88192-374-2.
- Freeman, J. D. (1975). "Revision of Trillium subgenus Phyllantherum (Liliaceae)". Brittonia. 27 (1): 1–62. Bibcode:1975Britt..27....1F. doi:10.2307/2805646. JSTOR 2805646. S2CID 20824379.
- Pursh, Frederick (1814). Flora Americae Septentrionalis; or A systematic arrangement and description of the plants of North America. London. LCCN 05024608.
