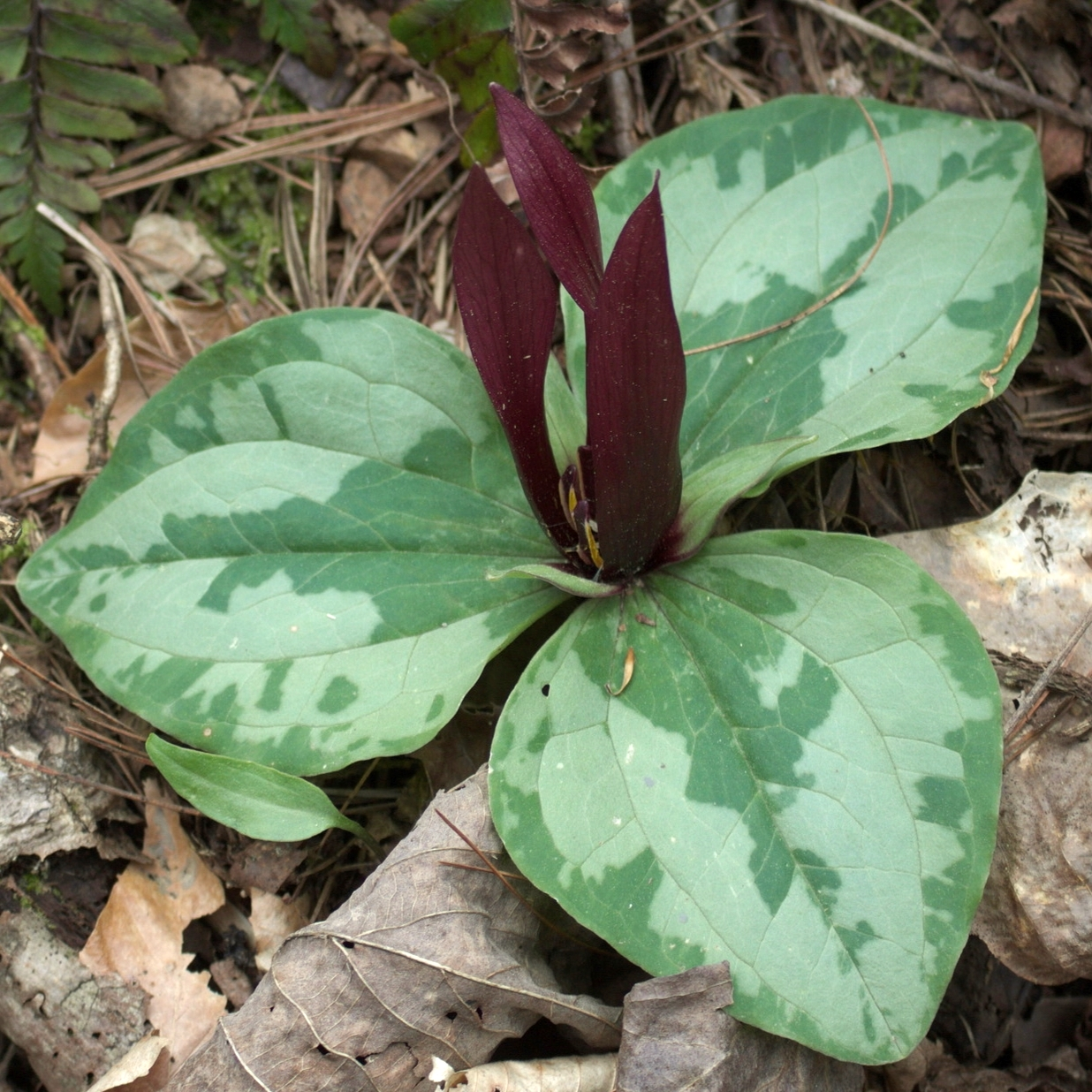

Conservation status
- Apparently Secure (NatureServe)

Scientific classification
- Kingdom: Plantae
- Clade: Embryophytes
- Clade: Tracheophytes
- Clade: Angiosperms
- Clade: Monocots
- Order: Liliales
- Family: Melanthiaceae
- Genus: Trillium
- Species: T. decumbens

Binomial name
- Trillium decumbens Harb.

Synonyms
- Trillium delicatum

= Trillium decumbens =

Species of flowering plant

Trillium decumbens, also known as the decumbent trillium or trailing wakerobin, is a species of flowering plant in the bunchflower family (Melanthiaceae). It is native to the southeastern United States, specifically Tennessee, Georgia, and Alabama, where it grows in mature deciduous woodlands or on open rocky wooded slopes.

== Description ==
Trillium decumbens is a perennial herbaceous plant that blooms from mid-March to April. The dark maroon flower petals are long and twisted, and held upright at full bloom. The flowers emit a strongly fetid odor. Unlike most other trilliums, its stems grow along the ground ("decumbent") rather than standing upright, so that the plant appears to rest on the surrounding leaf litter. This characteristic is what drew the attention of its discoverer, Charles Lawrence Boynton. Its leaves are mottled green and silver. They die back early in the season while the fruit, a dark purple berry, is still developing. By early autumn, the ripe fruit is presented on a stalk without surrounding leaves.

== Taxonomy ==
Trillium decumbens was first described by American botanist Thomas Grant Harbison in 1902. It was one of several Trillium species described by Harbison as part of a project to review what he considered the neglected biodiversity within the genus. He emphasized the uniqueness of its combination of a decumbent and finely-hairy stem, relatively large and twisted petals, and prominently elongated anther connectives to distinguish it from other trilliums.

Several "amazingly disjunct" central Georgia populations formerly identified as T. decumbens are thought to constitute a new species, Trillium delicatum Floden & E.E.Schill.. The latter differs markedly from T. decumbens genetically, morphologically, and ecologically, resembling it only in general appearance.

== Conservation ==
The global conservation status of Trillium decumbens is apparently secure (G4). It is critically imperiled (S1) in the Tennessee and vulnerable (S3) in both Georgia and Alabama.

== Bibliography ==
- Frett, Jeanne (2007). Trilliums at Mt. Cuba Center: A Visitor's Guide. Mt. Cuba Center Inc. ISBN 978-0-9770848-1-4.
- Armitage, Allan M. (2011). Armitage's Garden Perennials. Timber Press. pp. 315–317. ISBN 978-1-60469-038-5.
