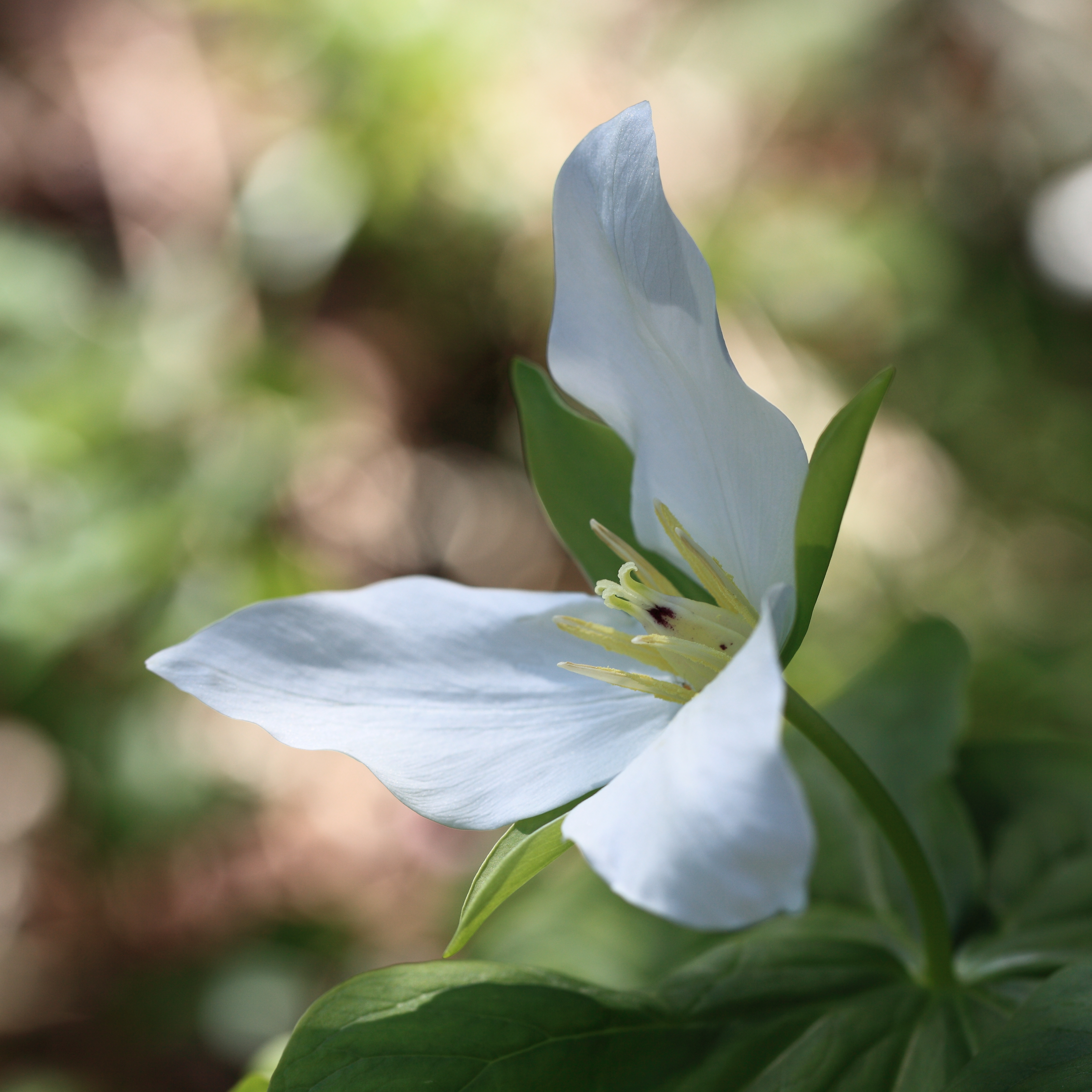

Scientific classification
- Kingdom: Plantae
- Clade: Tracheophytes
- Clade: Angiosperms
- Clade: Monocots
- Order: Liliales
- Family: Melanthiaceae
- Genus: Trillium
- Species: T. camschatcense

Binomial name
- Trillium camschatcense Ker Gawl.

Synonyms
- Trillium kamtschaticum Pall. ex Pursh; Trillium kamtschatikum Ledeb.; Trillium pallasii Hultén

= Trillium camschatcense =

Species of flowering plant

Trillium camschatcense is a species of flowering plant in the family Melanthiaceae. It is found in the moist forests of East Asia, in Japan (Hokkaido and northern Honshu), Korea, China (Jilin Province), and eastern Russia (Kamchatka, Kuril Islands, Sakhalin, Primorye, and Khabarovsk).

Trillium camschatcense, a perennial herbaceous plant, is 30 to 50 cm (12 to 19.5 in) tall with white flowers. The plant grows in richly wooded areas, often on steep hillsides.
