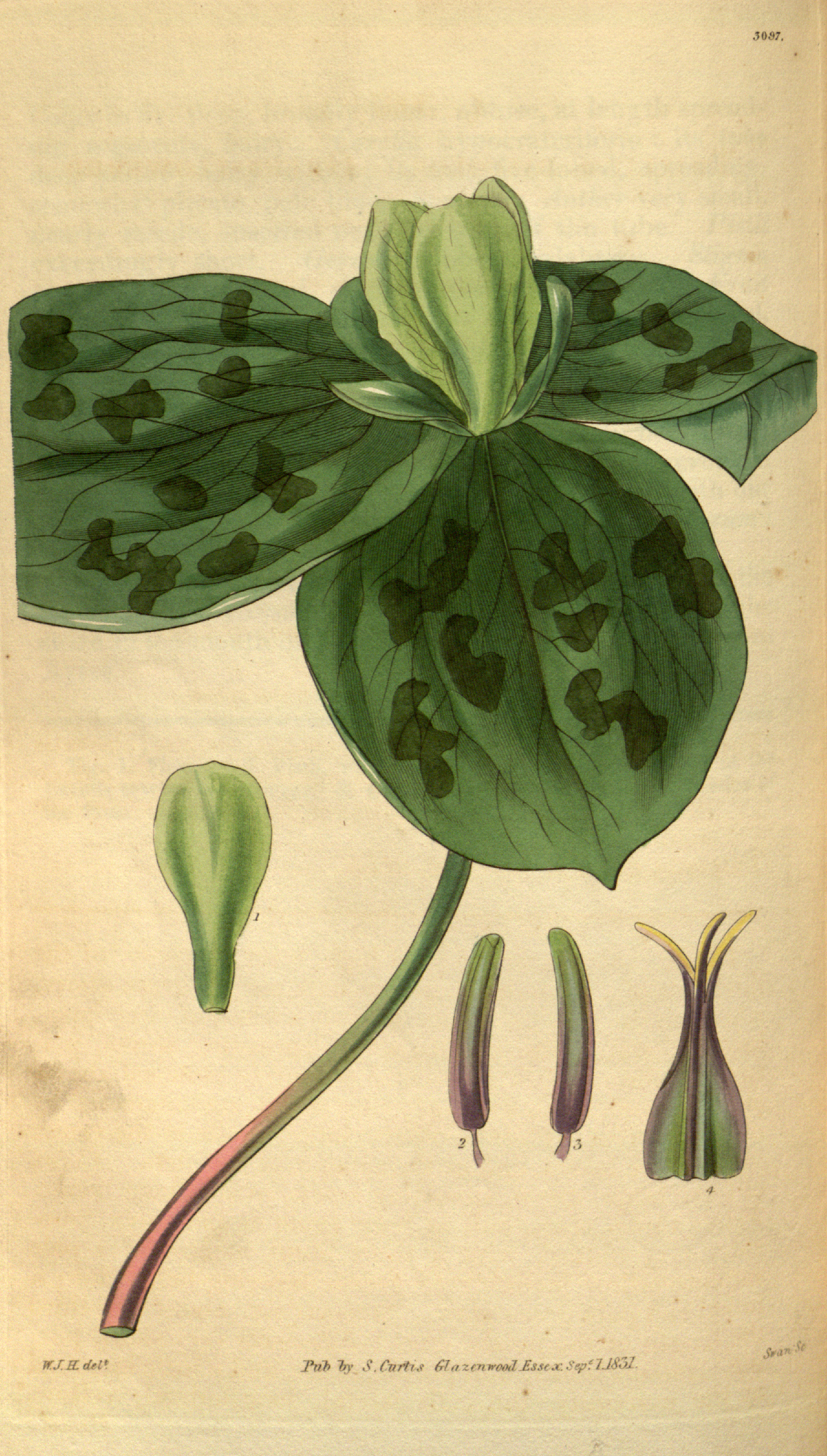
- 1831 Illustration

Conservation status
- Vulnerable (NatureServe)

Scientific classification
- Kingdom: Plantae
- Clade: Tracheophytes
- Clade: Angiosperms
- Clade: Monocots
- Order: Liliales
- Family: Melanthiaceae
- Genus: Trillium
- Species: T. discolor

Binomial name
- Trillium discolor Wray ex Hook.

Synonyms
- Trillium sessile var. wrayi S.Watson; Trillium luteum var. latipetalum R.R.Gates

= Trillium discolor =

Species of flowering plant

Trillium discolor, the mottled wakerobin, pale yellow trillium, or small yellow toadshade, is a species of flowering plant in the family Melanthiaceae. It is native to areas of the Savannah River drainage system of Georgia, North Carolina and South Carolina such as Steven's Creek Heritage Preserve and Lake Keowee. It is found along moist stream banks in upland woods, on acidic to basic soils.

== Description ==
Trillium discolor is a perennial herbaceous plant that blooms mid April to early May. It has a flower with pale yellow petals that stand upright at the junction of the three leaf-like bracts.

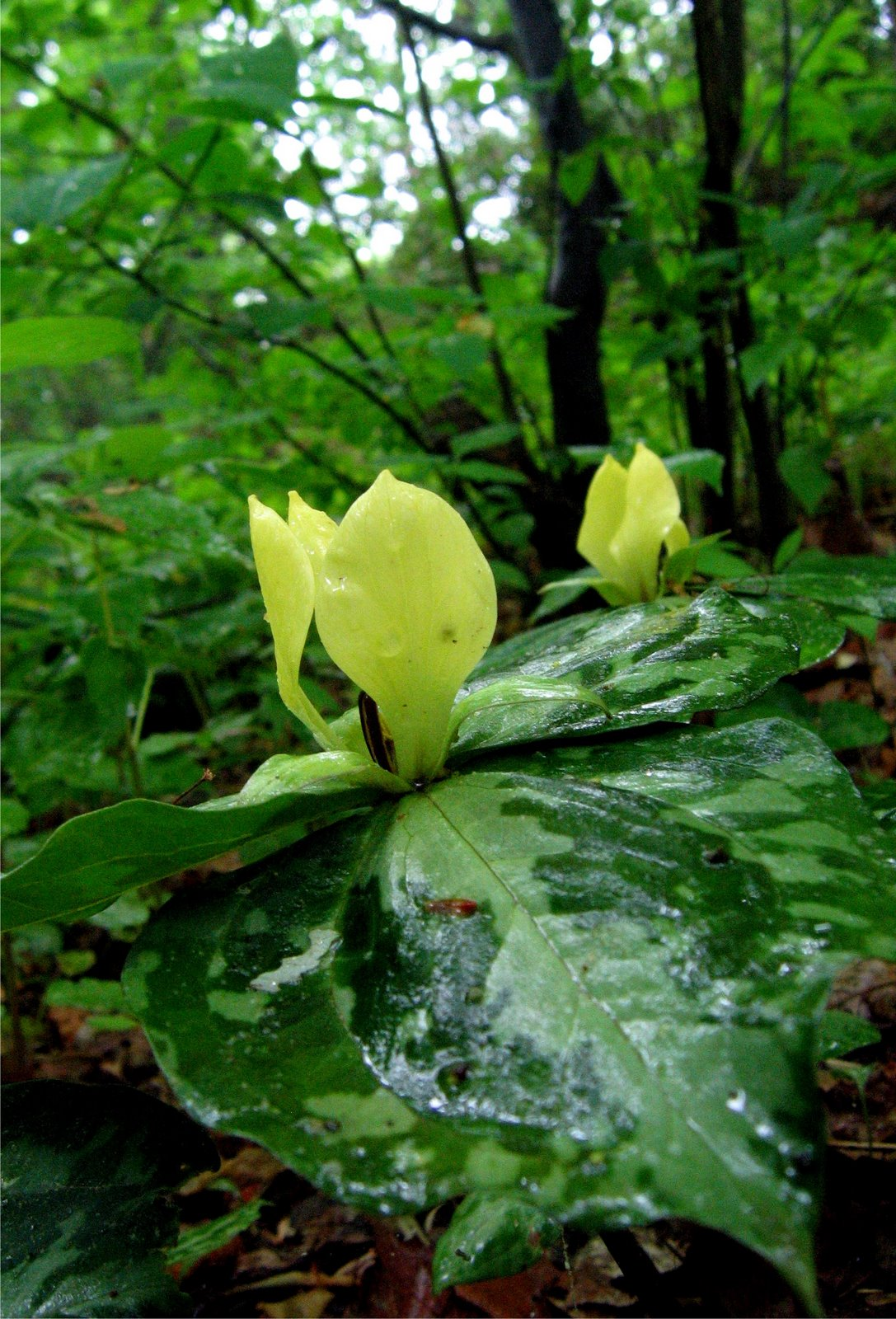

== Bibliography ==
- Case, Frederick W.; Case, Roberta B. (1997). Trilliums. Portland, Oregon: Timber Press. ISBN 978-0-88192-374-2.
- Freeman, J. D. (1975). "Revision of Trillium subgenus Phyllantherum (Liliaceae)". Brittonia. 27 (1): 1–62. Bibcode:1975Britt..27....1F. doi:10.2307/2805646. JSTOR 2805646. S2CID 20824379.
