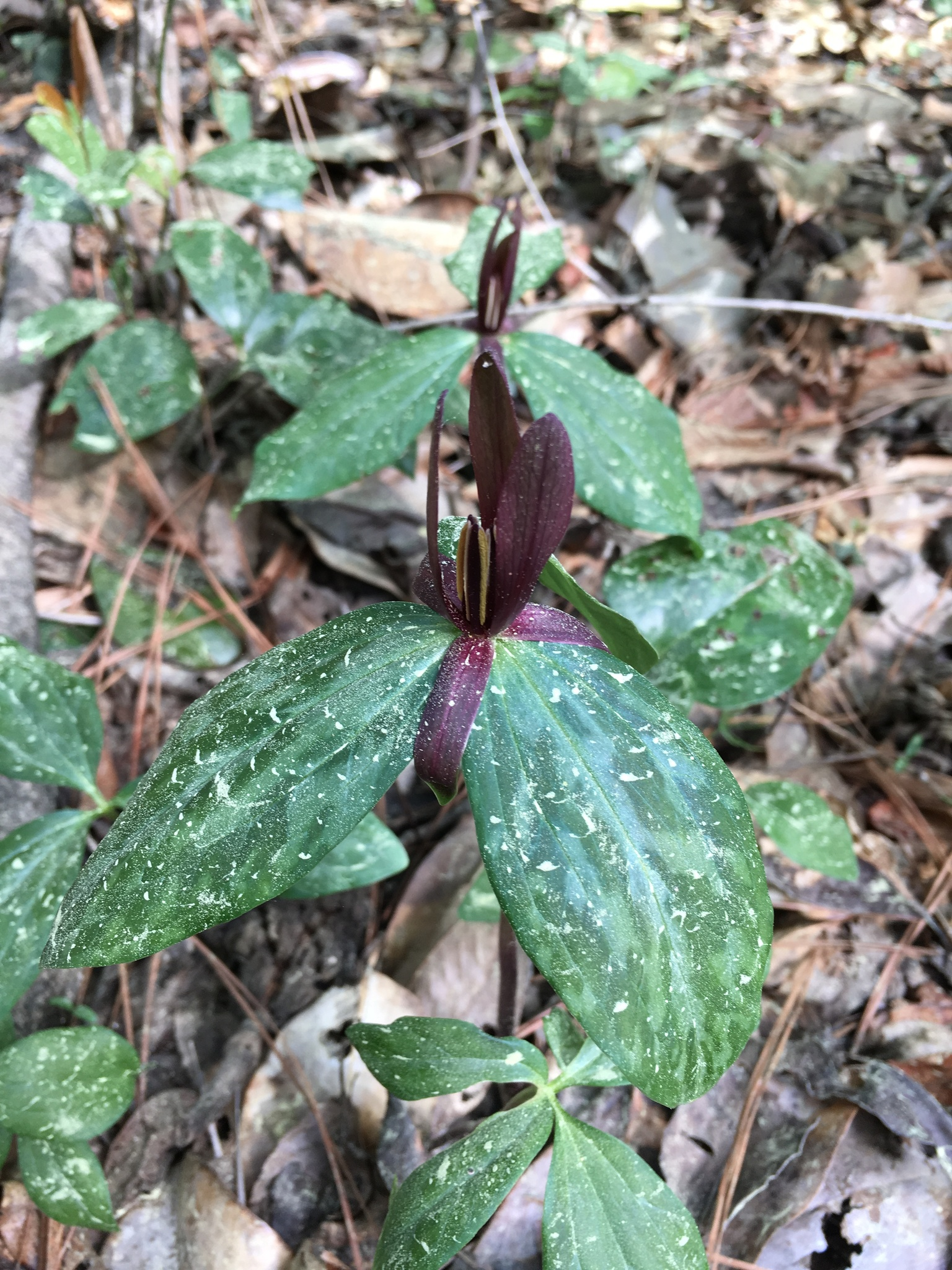
- Trillium gracile plants in bloom, San Jacinto Co., TX, USA

Conservation status
- Imperiled (NatureServe)

Scientific classification
- Kingdom: Plantae
- Clade: Tracheophytes
- Clade: Angiosperms
- Clade: Monocots
- Order: Liliales
- Family: Melanthiaceae
- Genus: Trillium
- Species: T. gracile

Binomial name
- Trillium gracile J.D.Freeman

Synonyms
- Trillium gracile f. luteum J.D.Freeman

= Trillium gracile =

Species of flowering plant

Trillium gracile, commonly known as the Sabine River wakerobin, slender trillium, or graceful trillium, is a species of flowering plant in the family Melanthiaceae. It is native to the region along the Sabine River in western Louisiana and eastern Texas. It generally grows in mature pine and hardwood forests, and on riverbanks.

Trillium gracile is a perennial herbaceous plant that spreads by means of underground rhizomes. The stem has 3 bracts in a whorl well above ground, each bract up to 8.5 cm (3.4 inches) long, the blades green mottled with darker green splotches. Flowers are solitary on each scape, purple with a musty-like fragrance.
