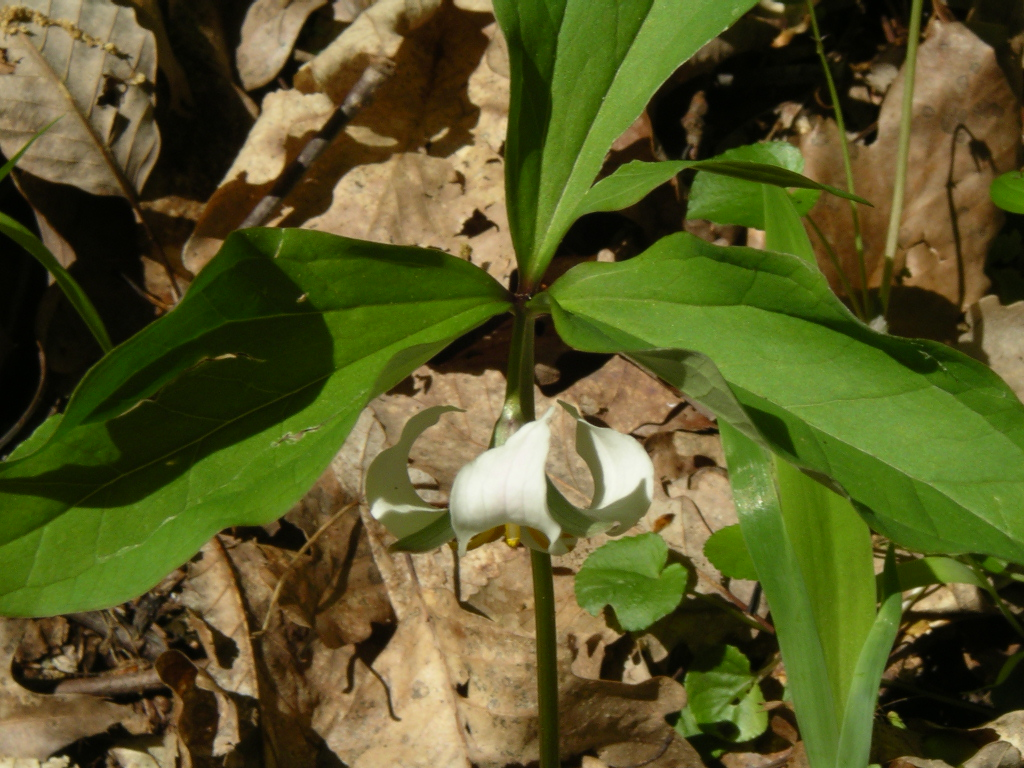

Conservation status
- Apparently Secure (NatureServe)

Scientific classification
- Kingdom: Plantae
- Clade: Tracheophytes
- Clade: Angiosperms
- Clade: Monocots
- Order: Liliales
- Family: Melanthiaceae
- Genus: Trillium
- Species: T. catesbaei

Binomial name
- Trillium catesbaei Elliott

Synonyms
- Heterotypic synonyms: Delostylis cernuum Raf.; Delostylis stylosum (Nutt.) Raf.; Trillium balduinianum Raf.; Trillium declinatum Raf.; Trillium nervosum Elliott; Trillium stylosum Nutt.

= Trillium catesbaei =

Species of flowering plant

Trillium catesbaei, also known as bashful wakerobin or rosy wake-robin, is a spring flowering perennial plant found in the southeastern United States.

== Description ==
Trillium catesbaei is a perennial herb spreading by means of underground rhizomes. Stems are up to 45 cm tall, with white, pink, or rose-colored flowers that sometimes turn darker pink as they get older. Sometimes the flowers are hidden behind green or yellow bracts (hence the "bashful" part of one of the common names).

== Taxonomy ==
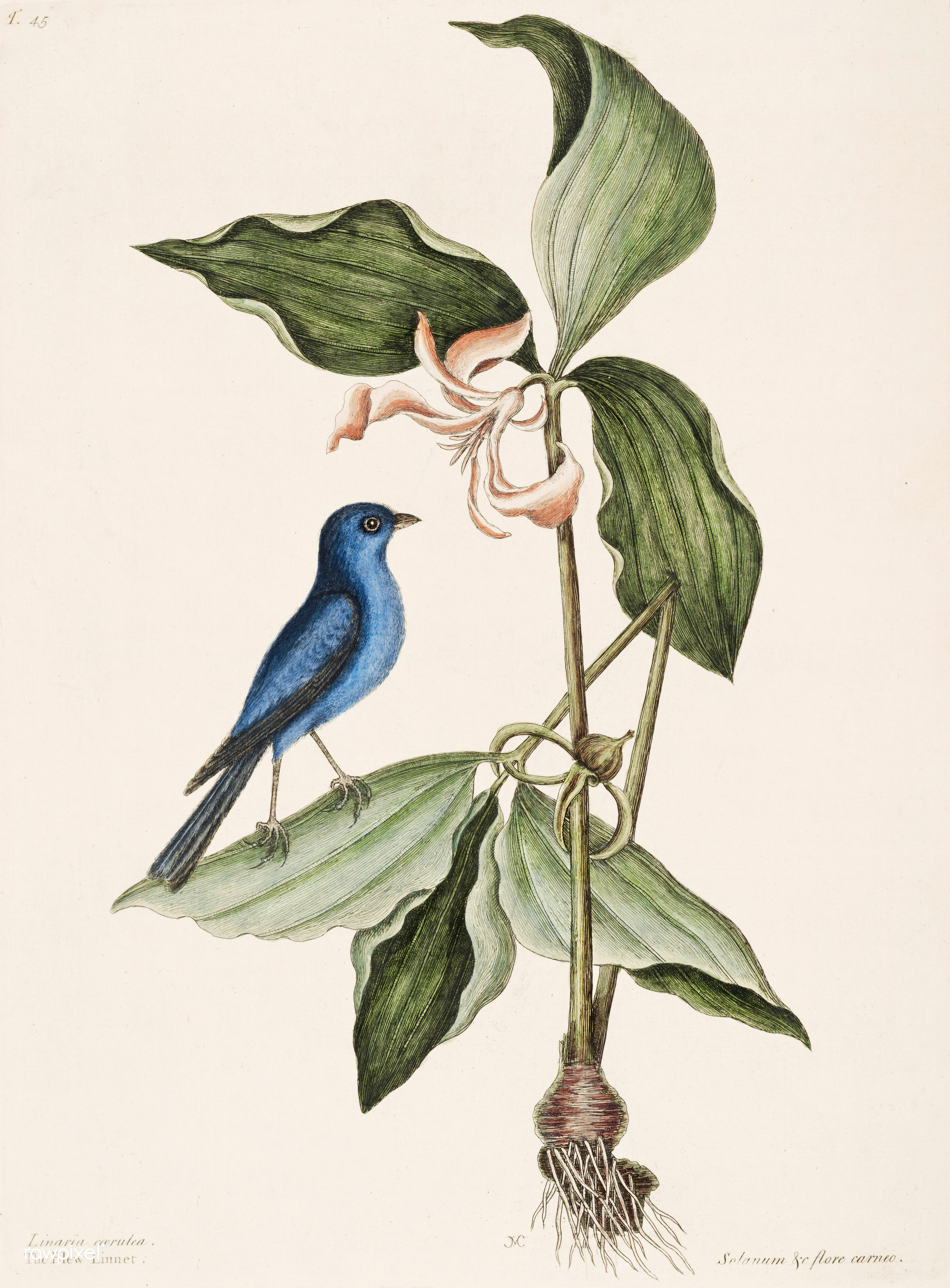
A botanical illustration of Trillium catesbaei published by Mark Catesby in 1730.

Trillium catesbaei was named and described by the American botanist Stephen Elliott in 1817. The specific epithet catesbaei honors the English naturalist Mark Catesby who published an illustration of Trillium catesbaei Elliott in 1730.

== Distribution and habitat ==
Trillium catesbaei is found in the southeastern United States. Like most trilliums, it prefers moist, humus-rich soil in shade. Its northern limit includes the Great Smoky Mountains and other parts of North Carolina and Tennessee. Most of its populations are in the Piedmont from North Carolina to Alabama, under deciduous trees such as American beech, various oak and hickory species, and tulip poplar. Its southernmost natural occurrence is in Escambia County, Alabama.

== Bibliography ==
- Catesby, Mark (1734–1747). The natural history of Carolina, Florida and the Bahama Islands. Vol. 2. London: self-published.
- Reveal, James L. (2012). "A nomenclatural summary of the plant and animal names based on images in Mark Catesby's Natural History (1729–1747)" (PDF). Phytoneuron 2012-11: 1–32. ISSN 2153-733X.
