= Ontario Trillium Protection Act =

Unapproved Canadian legislation

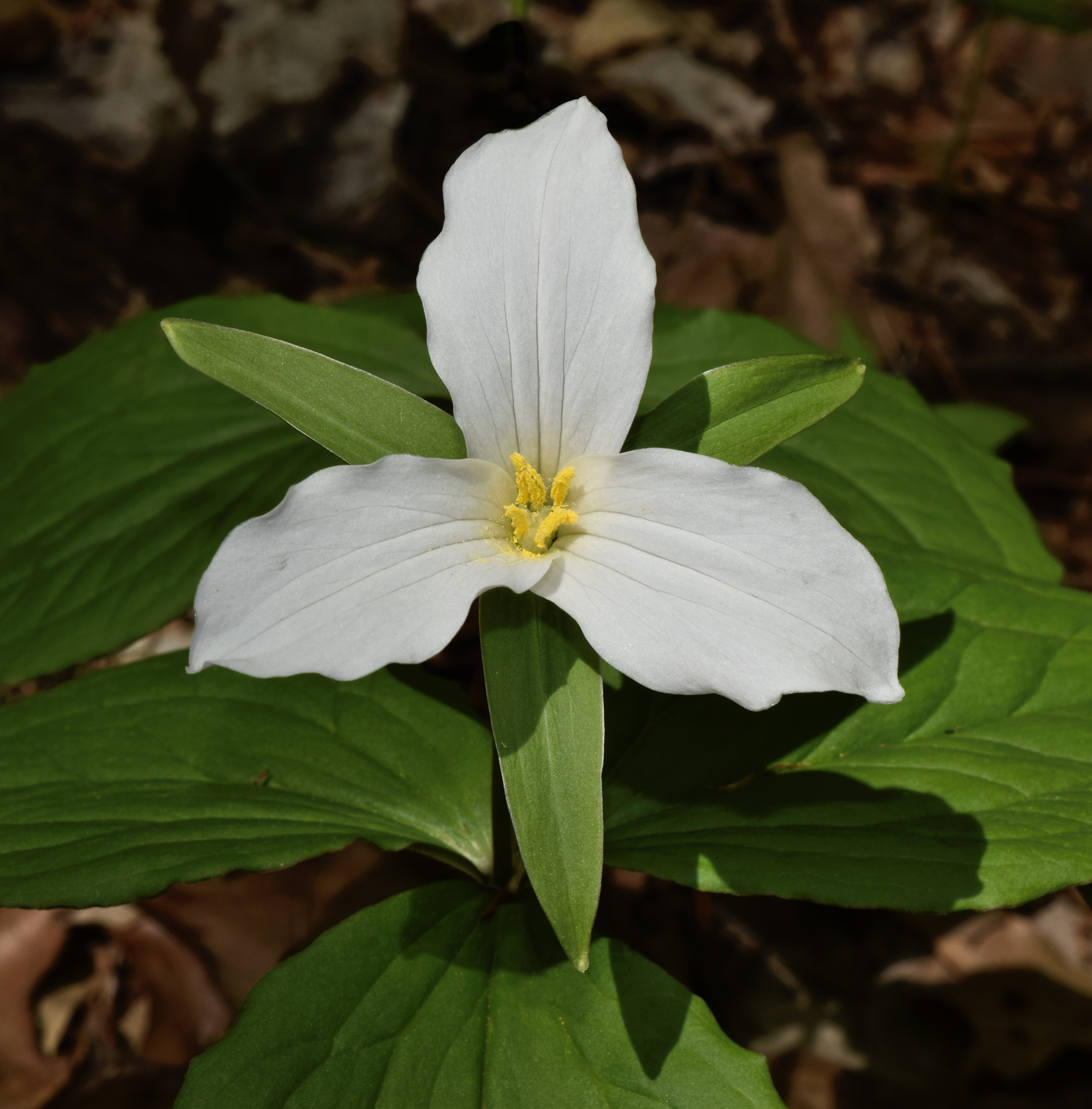
Trillium grandiflorum

The Ontario Trillium Protection Act (also known as Bill 184) of 2009 is an amendment to the Floral Emblem Act of Ontario, Canada proposed as a private member's bill by Liberal politician Jeff Leal.

The Act, if approved, would prohibit the picking of trilliums in Ontario. Having not received final approval, the act remains unapproved.

== Background ==
Since 1937, trilliums have been the official flower of Ontario. They are easily damaged by picking, and picking them is illegal in British Columbia, leading people to commonly believe that is also illegal in Ontario.

Jeff Leal is a Canadian municipal and provincial politician who previously worked as the Ontario Minister of Agriculture, Food and Rural Affairs.

== Ontario Trillium Protection Act ==
The Ontario Trillium Protection Act is a private members bill introduced to the Legislative Assembly of Ontario by Liberal politician Jeff Leal in 2009. The Act, if passed, will forbid picking trilliums in public spaces, but permit picking by landowners and public workers. If would introduce a minimum $500 penalty for breaches of the act.

The Act passed its first reading in the Ontario Legislature but did not get full approval, and is therefore still awaiting royal assent. The absence of full approval leaves trillium picking unregulated in Ontario, except within provincial parks and protected conservation areas.

== See also ==
- Flora of Canada
