= Trillium georgianum =

Conservation status
- Critically Imperiled (NatureServe)

- Critically Endangered (IUCN 3.1)

Scientific classification
- Kingdom: Plantae
- Clade: Tracheophytes
- Clade: Angiosperms
- Clade: Monocots
- Order: Liliales
- Family: Melanthiaceae
- Tribe: Parideae
- Genus: Trillium
- Species: T. georgianum

Binomial name
- Trillium georgianum S.B.Farmer

Species of flowering plant

Trillium georgianum, the Georgia dwarf trillium, is a species of flowering plant in the family Melanthiaceae. It is one of the rarest, and perhaps most threatened species in the Trillium pusillum species complex. It is the sole representative of the complex in the U.S. state of Georgia.

== Taxonomy ==
Trillium georgianum was first described by Susan B. Farmer in 2017. Its type specimen was collected from Whitfield County, Georgia in 2016. The specific epithet georgianum refers to the U.S. state of Georgia, its only known location.

As of March 2023, the name Trillium georgianum S.B.Farmer is widely recognized. The species is a member of the Catesbaei group (Trillium subgen. Delostylis), a group of species typified by Trillium catesbaei.

== Distribution and habitat ==
Trillium georgianum is endemic to a single location along Swamp Creek, a tributary of the Conasauga River, in Whitfield County, Georgia.

== Conservation ==
The global conservation status of Trillium georgianum is critically imperiled (G1). The species is only known to occur in a single location in an area being developed for industrial usage.

== Bibliography ==
- Lampley, Jayne A.; Gereau, Roy; Floden, Aaron; Schilling, Edward E. (2022-07-05). "A revised subgeneric classification of Trillium (Parideae, Melanthiaceae)". Phytotaxa. 552 (5): 278–286. Bibcode:2022Phytx.552..278L. doi:10.11646/phytotaxa.552.5.1. S2CID 250368253.
