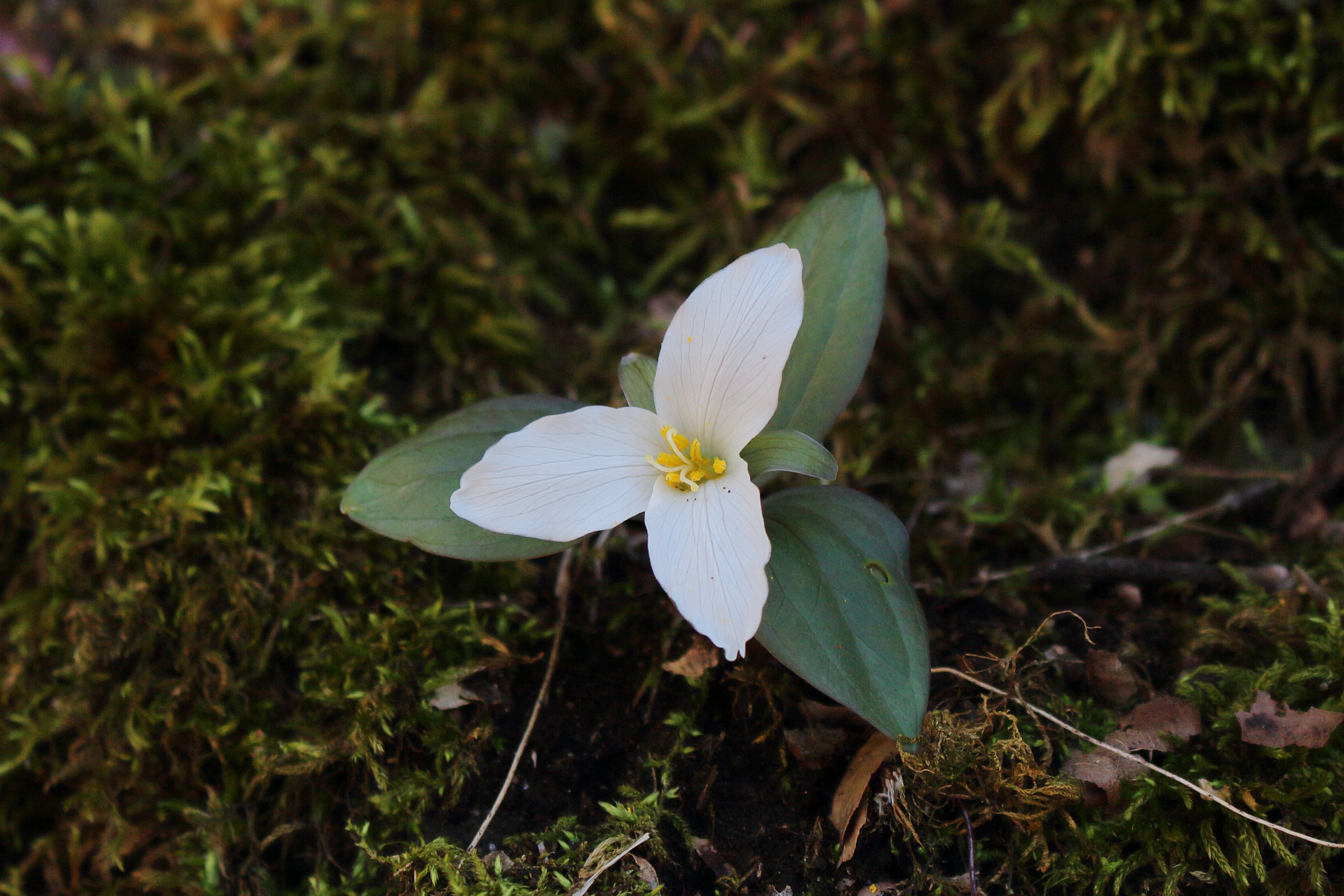
- T. nivale in bloom in Paint Township, Ohio

Conservation status
- Least Concern (IUCN 3.1)

- Apparently Secure (NatureServe)

Scientific classification
- Kingdom: Plantae
- Clade: Embryophytes
- Clade: Tracheophytes
- Clade: Angiosperms
- Clade: Monocots
- Order: Liliales
- Family: Melanthiaceae
- Genus: Trillium
- Species: T. nivale

Binomial name
- Trillium nivale Riddell, 1835

= Trillium nivale =

Snow trillium

Species of flowering plant

Trillium nivale, the snow trillium or dwarf white trillium, is a species of flowering plant in the family Melanthiaceae. It is native to parts of the east and midwest United States, primarily the Great Lakes States, the Ohio Valley, and the Upper Mississippi Valley, as far north as central Minnesota.

Trillium nivale is a perennial herbaceous plant that flowers late winter or early spring, occasionally while snow is still on the ground. Along the Ohio River valley, flowers may be seen in early March. At its northern limit in Minnesota, it blooms in early April. Along with the eastern skunk cabbage (Symplocarpus foetidus), T. nivale is one of the earliest flowering spring ephemerals. Given its winter hardiness, one would expect the range of T. nivale to extend farther north, but this is not the case.

Soon after pollination the pedicel turns downward, so that by the time the fruit is mature, it is hanging below the leaves. In June, the seeds are shed and the entire portion of the plant above ground suddenly disappears. The seeds are dispersed by ants, which may account for the low genetic diversity reported in some plant populations.

Trillium nivale is smaller than many of the other species in the genus, seldom reaching a height of more than 9 cm (3.5 in). Unlike most trilliums, it does not grow in leaf mold, preferring limy sandy gravel, crevices in limestone, or calcareous mineral soil.

Like other Trillium species, T. nivale has a one-leaf vegetative stage followed by a three-leaf vegetative (juvenile) stage. After twelve or more years of vegetative growth, the plant finally reaches its three-leaf reproductive (flowering) stage. In some populations, there may be ten or more one-leaf plants to each flowering plant. The latter has an indefinite life span of many years, often living for decades.

== Bibliography ==
- Case, Frederick W.; Case, Roberta B. (1997). Trilliums. Portland, Oregon: Timber Press. ISBN 978-0-88192-374-2.
