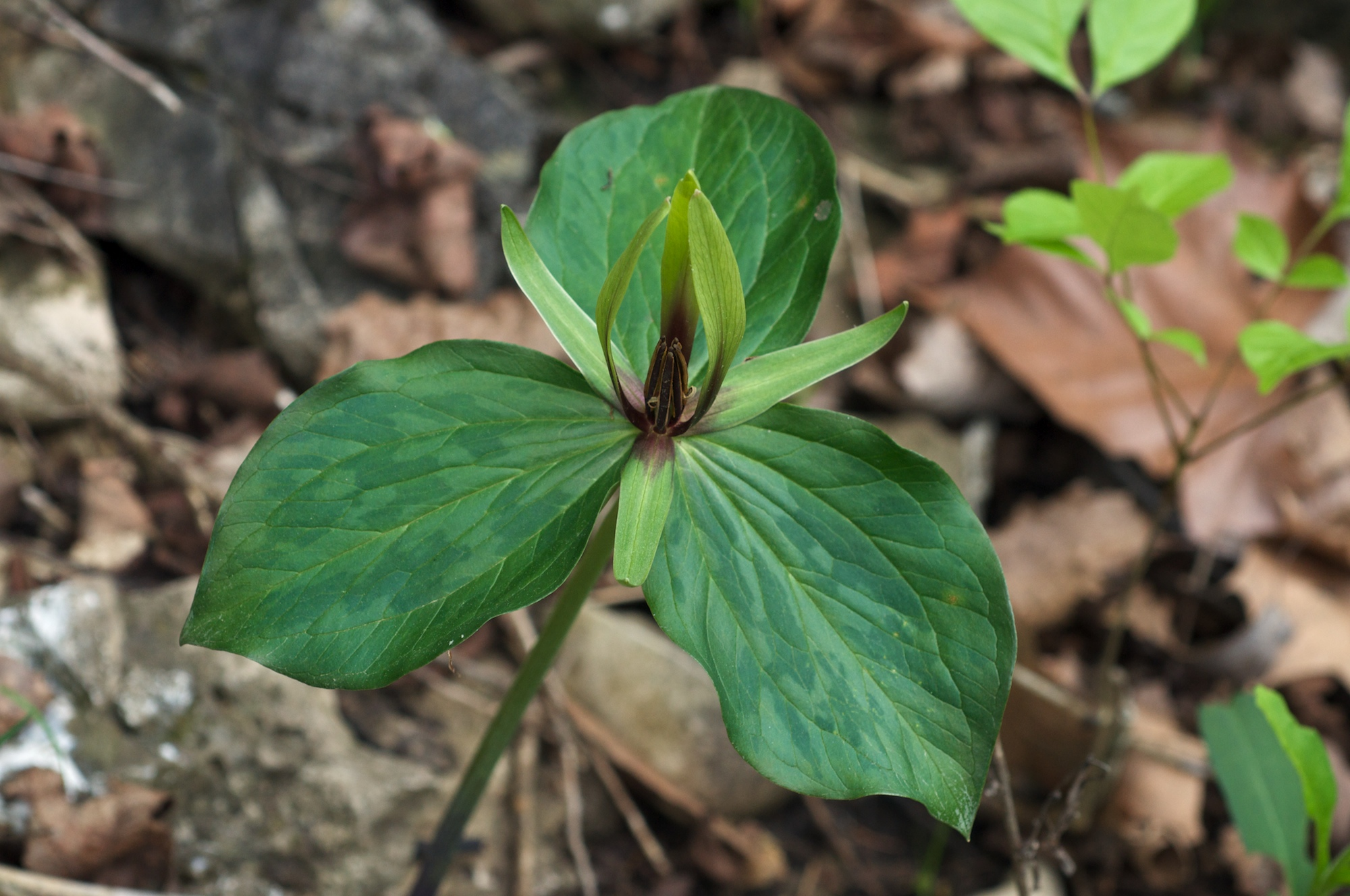

Conservation status
- Vulnerable (NatureServe)

Scientific classification
- Kingdom: Plantae
- Clade: Tracheophytes
- Clade: Angiosperms
- Clade: Monocots
- Order: Liliales
- Family: Melanthiaceae
- Genus: Trillium
- Species: T. viridescens

Binomial name
- Trillium viridescens Nutt., 1835

= Trillium viridescens =

Species of flowering plant

Trillium viridescens, also known as the Ozark trillium or tapertip wakerobin, is a species of flowering plant in the family Melanthiaceae. It is found in parts of Arkansas, Missouri, Oklahoma, Kansas, Texas and Louisiana. It usually grows in rich deciduous forests and mountain ranges where the soil is clayey and calcareous.

== Description ==
Trillium viridescens is a perennial herbaceous plant that blooms early April to mid May. The flower usually has bi-colored petals, purplish near the base and green above. The species is 2 feet (0.61 m) high.

== Bibliography ==
- Case, Frederick W. Jr. [in Spanish]; Case, Roberta B. (1997). Trilliums. Portland, Oregon: Timber Press. ISBN 978-0-88192-374-2.
