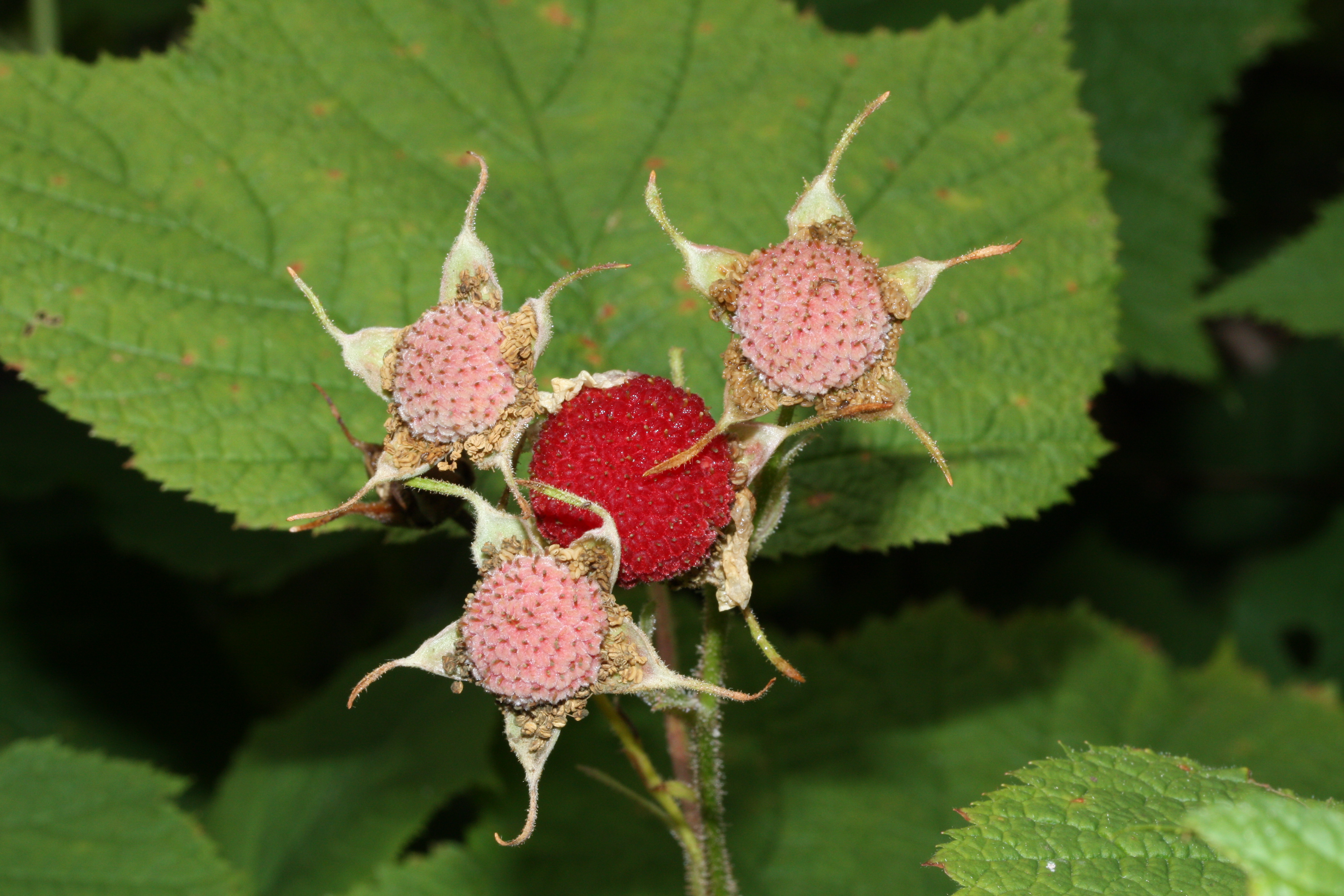

Conservation status
- Secure (NatureServe)

Scientific classification
- Kingdom: Plantae
- Clade: Tracheophytes
- Clade: Angiosperms
- Clade: Eudicots
- Clade: Rosids
- Order: Rosales
- Family: Rosaceae
- Genus: Rubus
- Subgenus: Rubus subg. Anoplobatus
- Species: R. parviflorus

Binomial name
- Rubus parviflorus Nutt. 1818

Synonyms
- Synonymy: Bossekia nutkana Greene; Bossekia parviflora (Nutt.) Greene; Rubacer parviflorum (Nutt.) Rydb.; Rubus natkanus G.Don; Rubus nutkanus Moc. ex Ser.; Rubus nutkanus var. nuttallii Torr. & A.Gray; Rubus nutkanus var. parviflorus (Nutt.) Focke; Rubus parviflorus var. bifarius Fernald; Rubus parviflorus var. grandiflorus Farw.; Rubus parviflorus var. heteradenius Fernald; Rubus parviflorus var. hypomalacus Fernald; Rubus parviflorus subsp. velutinus (Hook. & Arn.) R.L.Taylor & MacBryde; Rubus velutinus Hook. & Arn.; Rubus ribifolius C.K.Schneid.

= Rubus parviflorus =

Thimbleberry

Berry and plant

Rubus parviflorus, the fruit of which is commonly called the thimbleberry, western thimbleberry or redcap, is a species of Rubus with large hairy leaves and no thorns.

The species is native to northern temperate regions of North America. It produces red aggregate fruit similar in appearance to a raspberry; although edible, it is too soft for major commerce. It is cultivated as an ornamental.

== Description ==
Rubus parviflorus is a dense shrub up to 2.5 meters (8 feet) tall with canes no more than 1.5 centimeters (1/2 inch) in diameter, often growing in large clumps which spread through the plant's underground rhizome. Unlike many other members of the genus, it has no prickles. The leaves are palmate, up to 20 cm (8 in) across (much larger than most other Rubus species), with five lobes; they are soft and fuzzy in texture.

The flowers are 2 to 6 cm (3/4 to 2 1/4 in) in diameter, with five white petals and numerous pale yellow stamens. The flower of this species is among the largest of any Rubus species.

The plant produces composite fruits approximately 1 cm (1/2 in) in diameter, which ripen to a bright red in mid to late summer. Like raspberries, it is not a true berry, but instead an aggregate fruit of numerous drupelets around a central core. The drupelets may be carefully removed intact, separately from the core, when picked, leaving a hollow fruit which bears a resemblance to a thimble, perhaps the source of the plant's common name.

The plants are similar in many respects to the eastern thimbleberry or purple-flowering raspberry, Rubus odoratus, but the flowers of the latter are purple and the distribution is easterly.

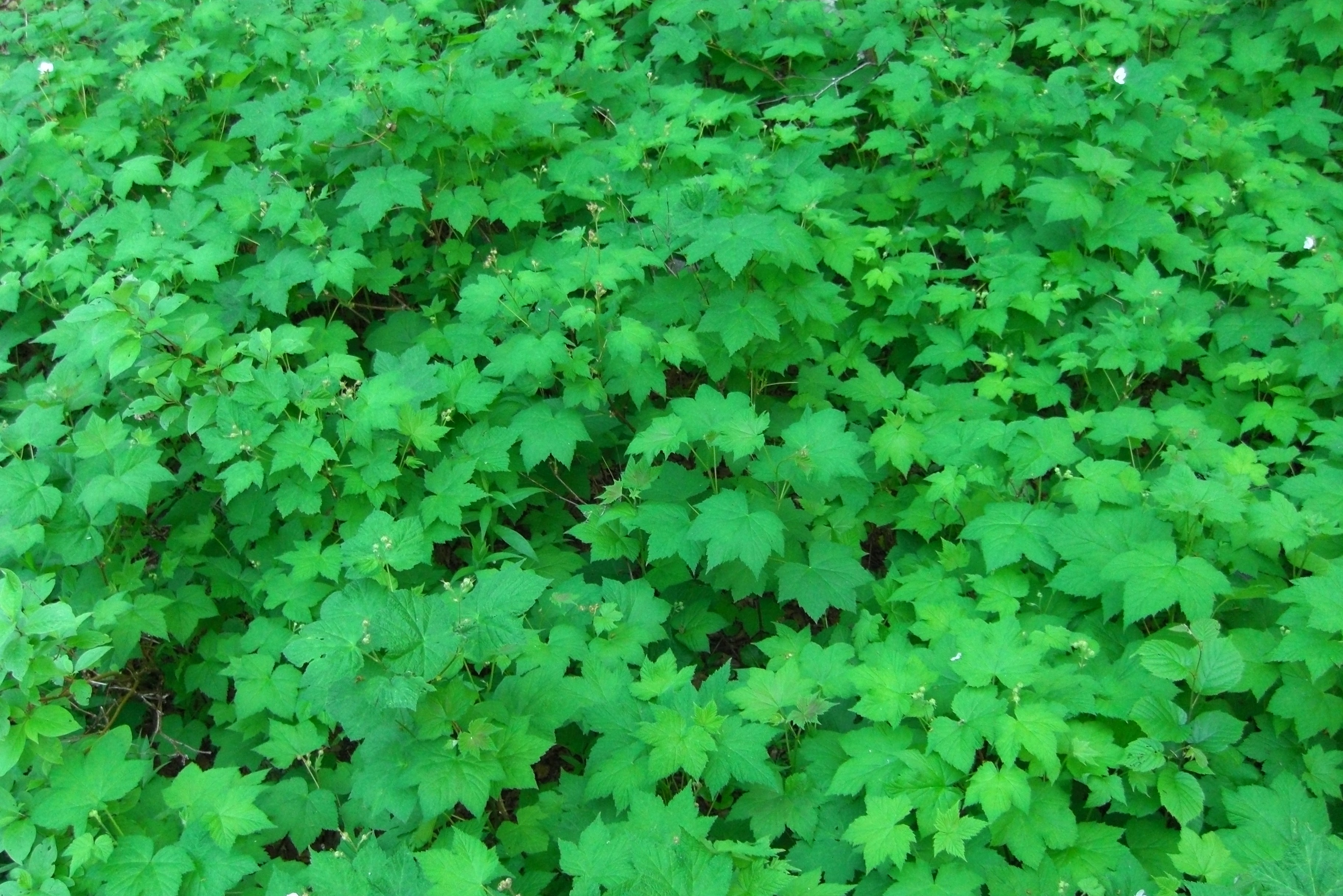
Foliage

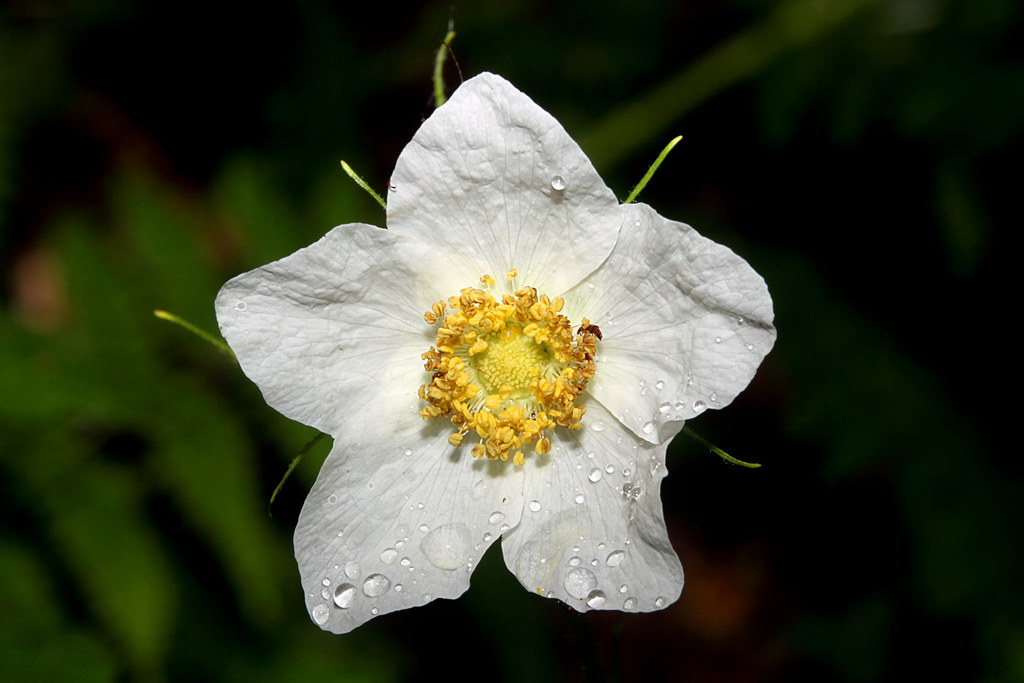
Flower

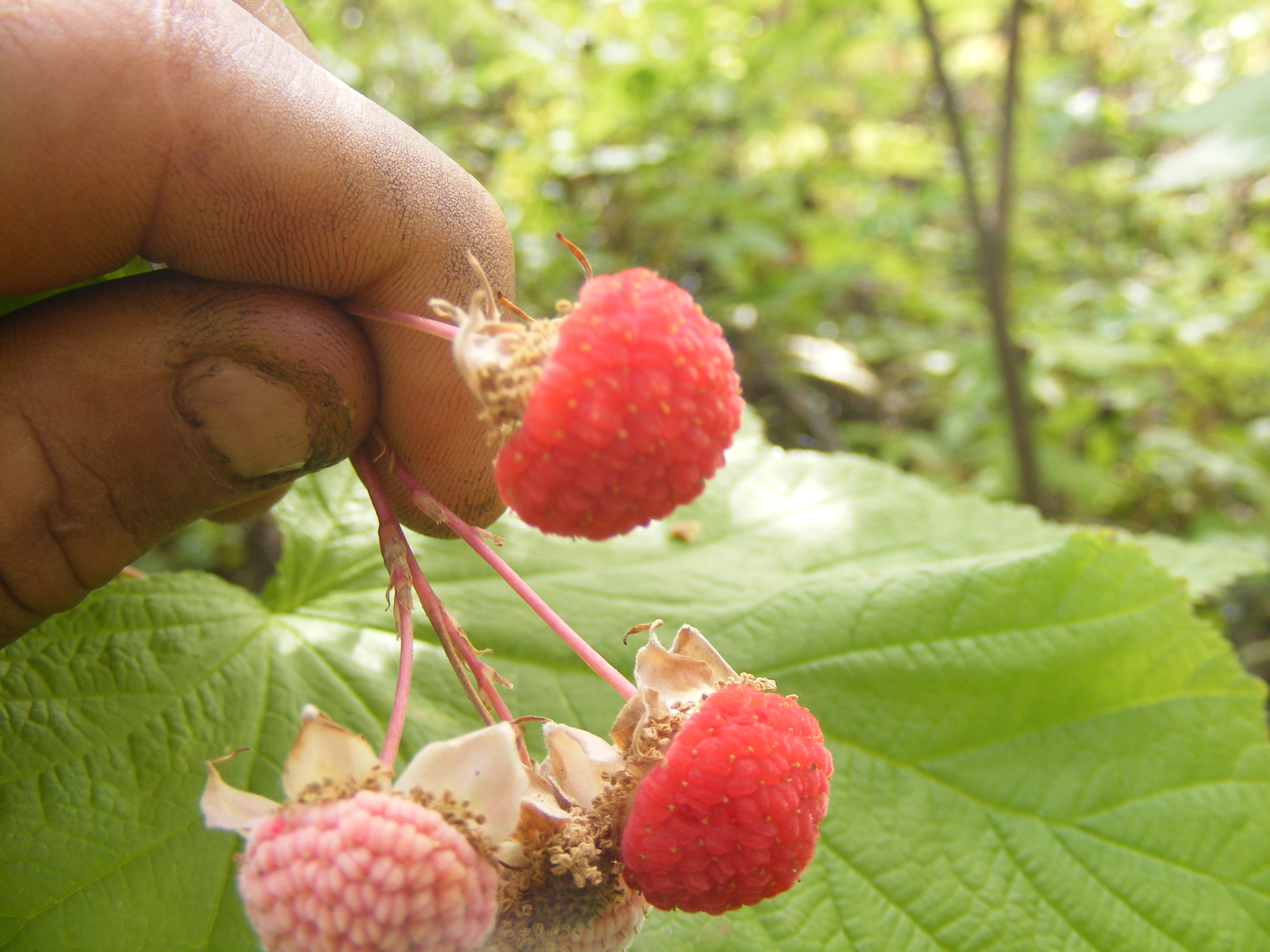
Berries

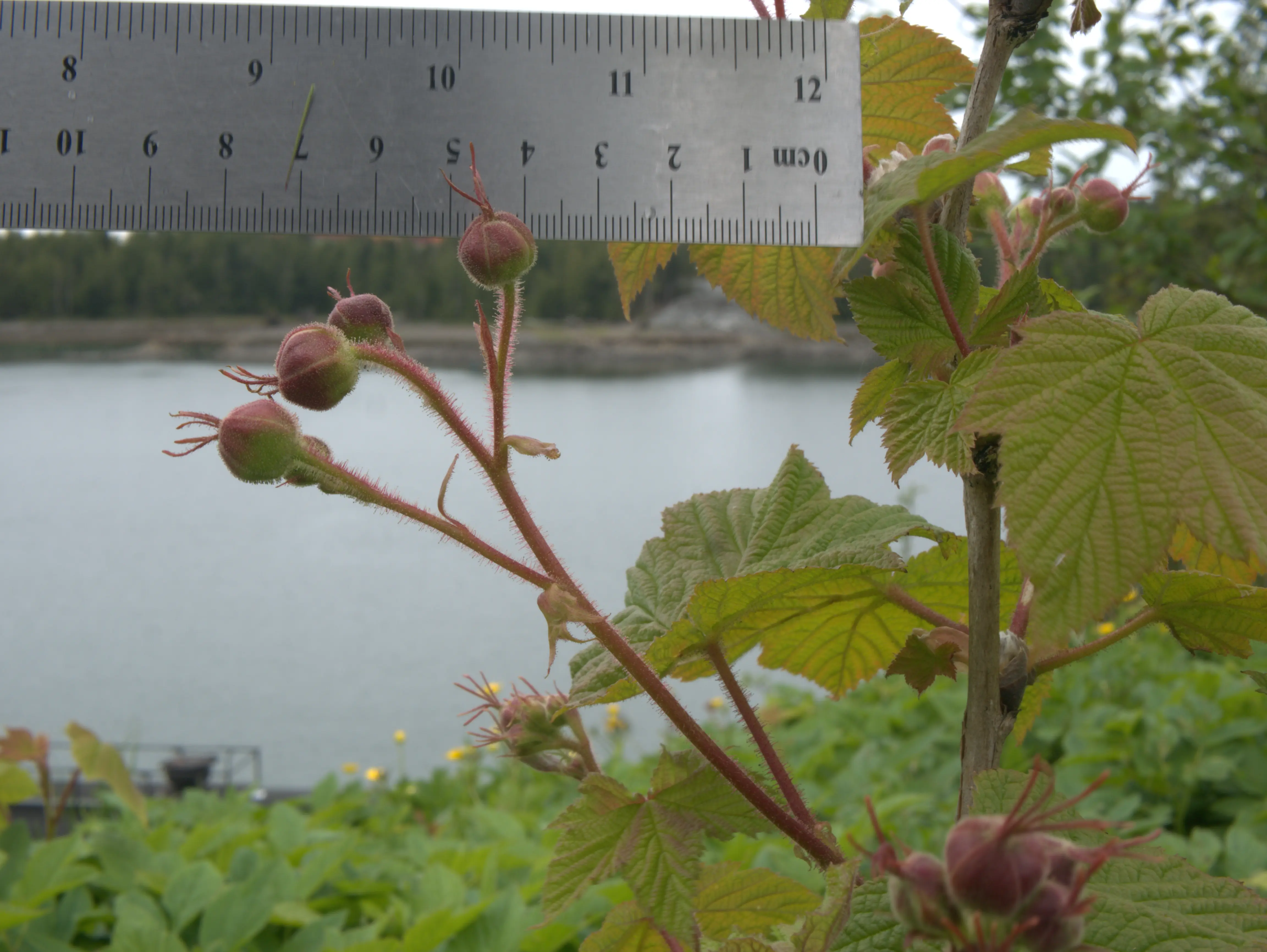
Immature

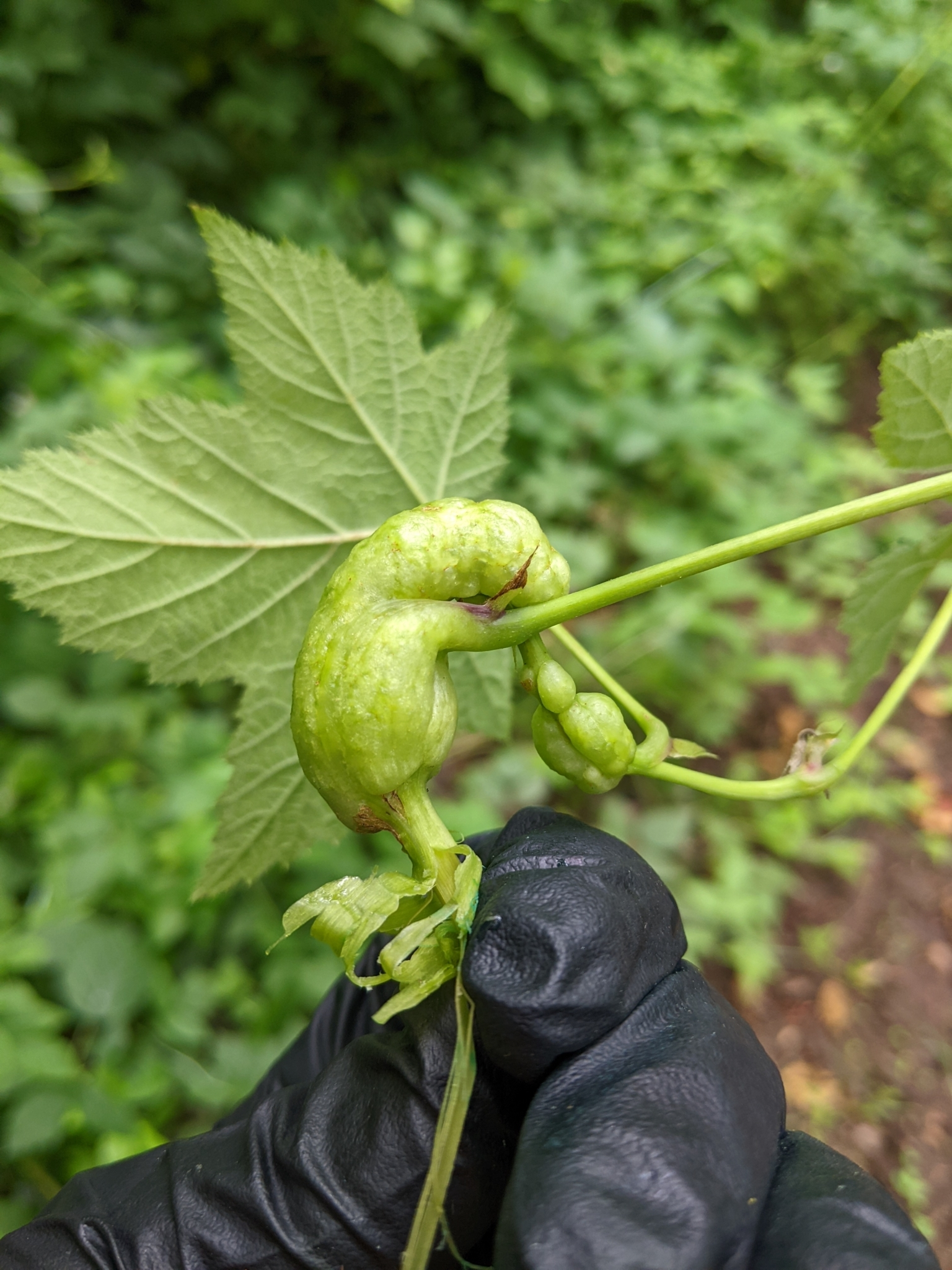
Gall produced by Diastrophus kincaidii

== Etymology ==
The specific epithet parviflorus ("small-flowered") is a misnomer, since the species' flower is the largest of the genus. The Concow tribe calls the plant wä-sā’ (Konkow language).

== Distribution and habitat ==
Rubus parviflorus is native to western North America from Alaska south as far as California, New Mexico, Chihuahua, and San Luis Potosí. Its range extends east to the Rocky Mountains and discontinuously to the Great Lakes Region. It grows from sea level in the north, up to elevations of 3,000 m (10,000 ft) in the south.

R. parviflorus typically grows along roadsides, railroad tracks, and in forest clearings, commonly appearing as an early part of the ecological succession in clear cut and forest fire areas.

Thimbleberry is found in forest understories with typical flora associates including coastal woodfern (Dryopteris arguta), Trillium ovatum and Smilacina racemosa.

== Ecology ==
The fruit is consumed by birds and bears, while black-tailed deer browse the young leaves and stems. Larvae of the wasp species Diastrophus kincaidii (thimbleberry gallmaker) develop in large, swollen galls on R. parviflorus stems. An aphid of genus Masonaphis and a midge of genus Dasineura also induce thimbleberry galls, on the leaves and petioles respectively.

== Cultivation ==
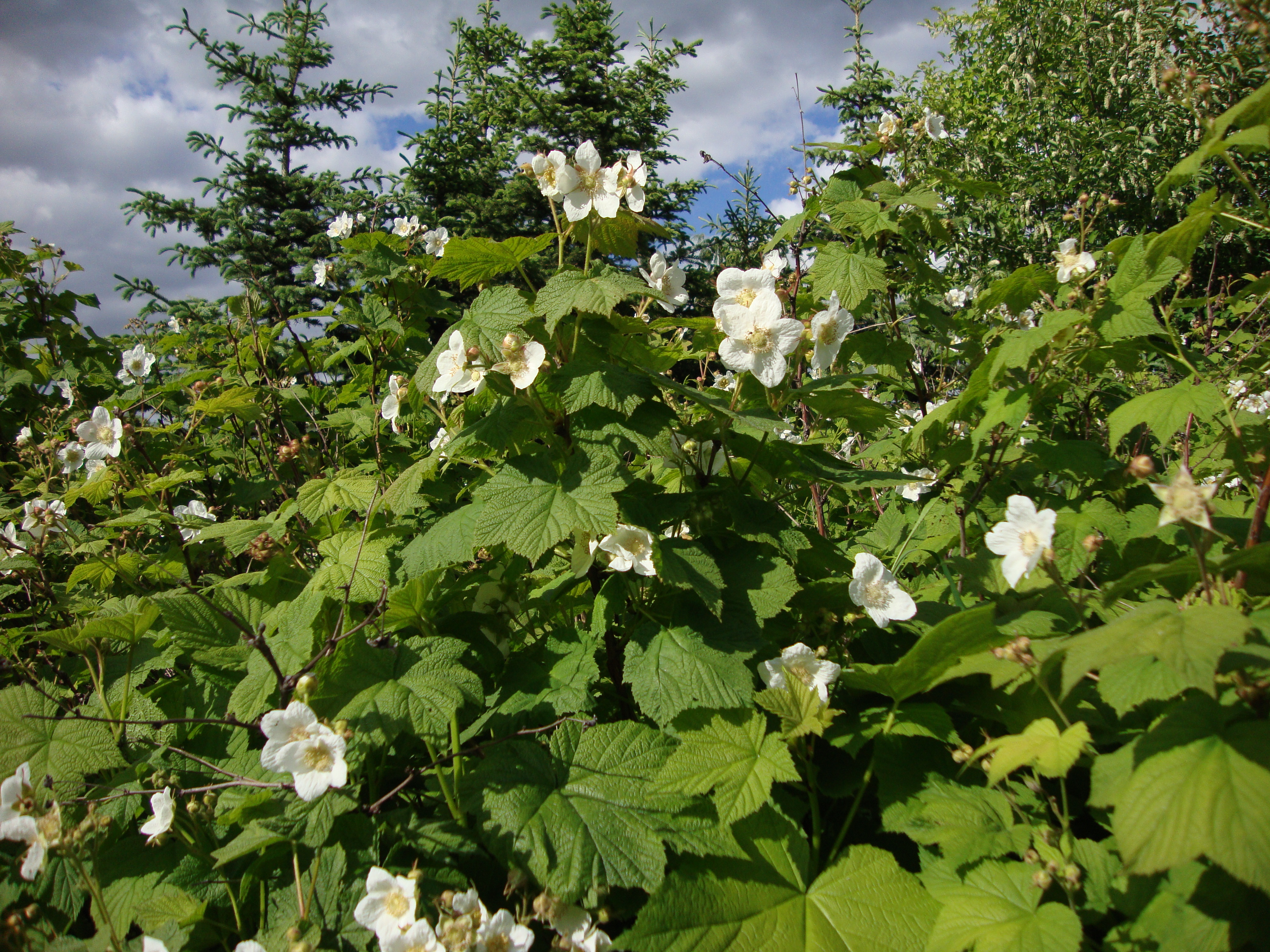
Cultivated plant in the Helsinki University Botanical Garden in Finland

R. parviflorus is cultivated by specialty plant nurseries as an ornamental plant, used in traditional, native plant, and wildlife gardens, in natural landscaping design, and in habitat restoration projects. The fruit has fragrance. Thimbleberry plants can be propagated most successfully by planting dormant rhizome segments, as well as from seeds or stem cuttings.

The flowers support pollinators, including of special value to native bees, honeybees, and bumblebees. The fruit is attractive to various birds and mammals, including bears. It is the larval host and a nectar source for the yellow-banded sphinx moth.

=== Cultivars ===
Cultivars of the plant are selected for ornamental qualities, such as for their fragrant flowers and/or attractive fall foliage color.

A double-flowered form of the thimbleberry was discovered near Squamish, British Columbia, by Iva Angerman (1903–2008) of West Vancouver. This clone does not appear to be in commerce, but is grown in the Botanic Garden of the University of British Columbia, Vancouver, and in the Native Plant Garden of the Royal British Columbia Museum, Victoria.

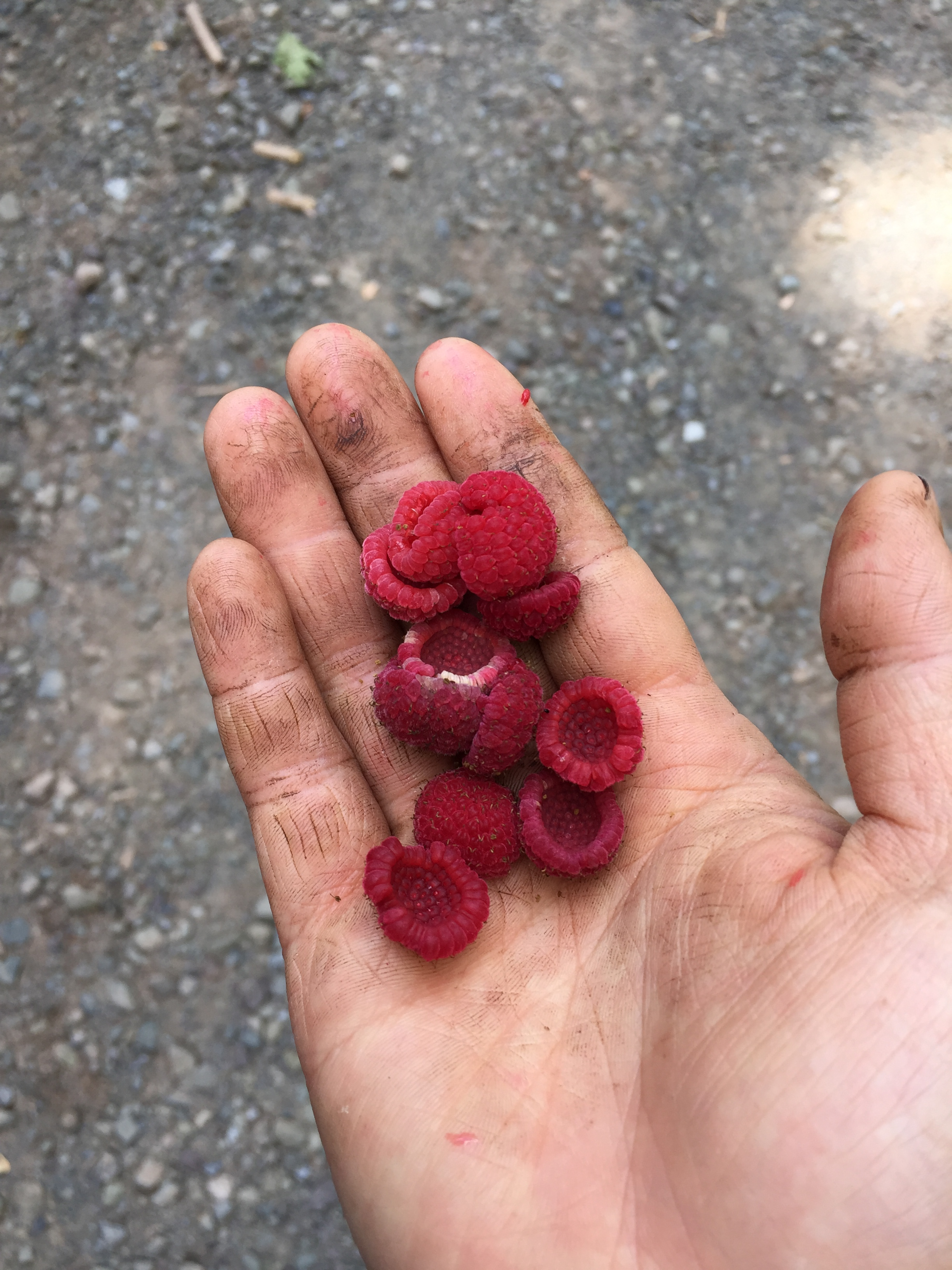
Berries foraged in New York State

== Uses ==
=== Cuisine ===
Thimbleberry fruits are flatter and softer (more fragile) than raspberries, but similarly have many small seeds. Because the fruit is so soft, it does not pack or ship well, so thimbleberries are rarely cultivated commercially.

Wild thimbleberries can be eaten raw or dried (the water content of ripe thimbleberries is quite variable), and can be made into a jam which is sold as a local delicacy in some parts of their range, notably in the Keweenaw Peninsula of Upper Michigan.

=== Traditional medicine ===
Many parts of the plant were used in folk medicine by Native Americans. A tea made from its leaves or roots was thought to be a treatment for wounds, burns, acne, or digestive problems; a tea made from the canes was thought to be useful as a diuretic. As of 2019, there is no evidence from modern clinical research or practice that R. parviflorus is effective for treating any disease.

Thimbleberry leaves can be used in place of toilet paper when in the wilderness.
