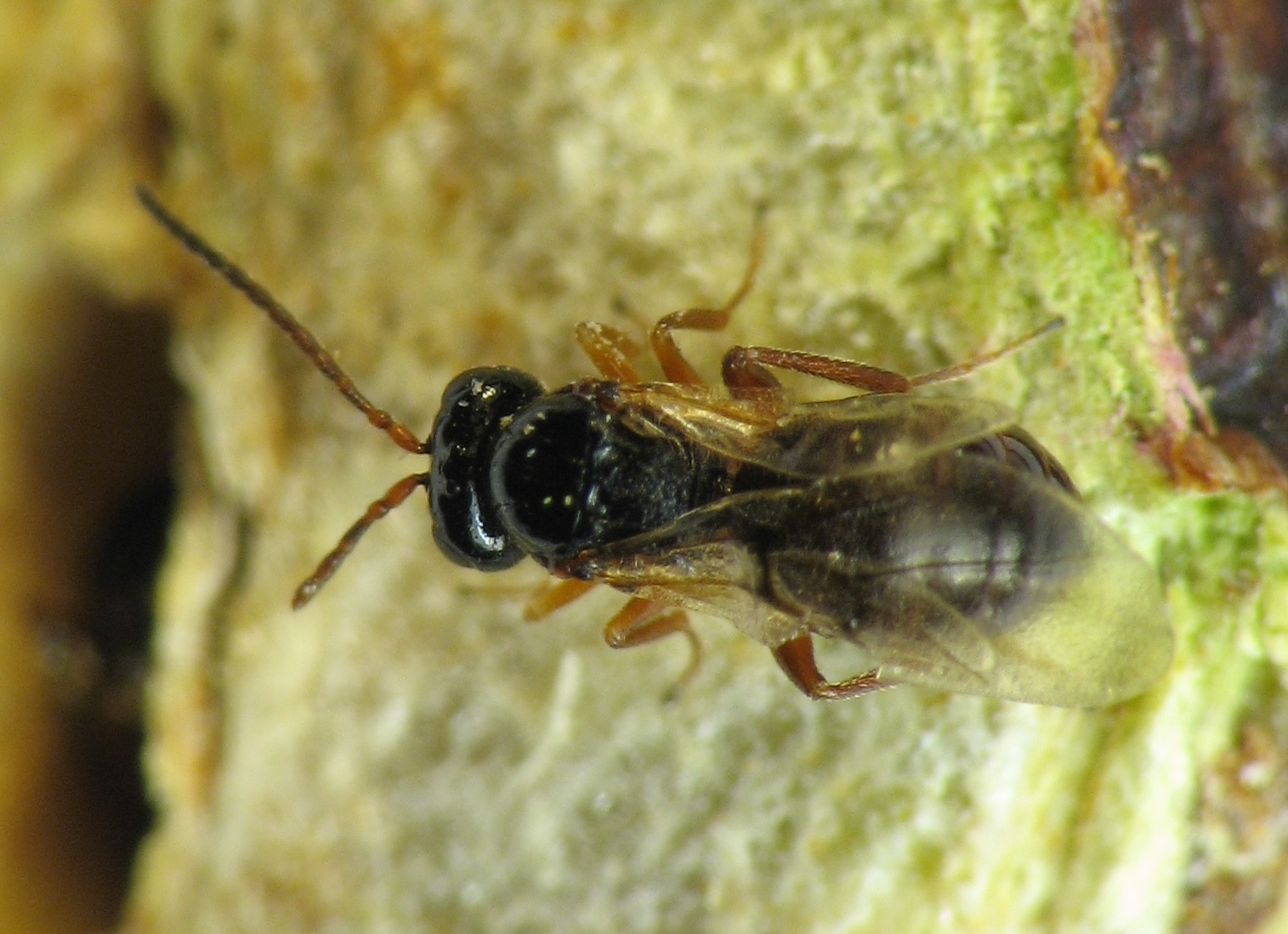

Scientific classification
- Kingdom: Animalia
- Phylum: Arthropoda
- Class: Insecta
- Order: Hymenoptera
- Family: Cynipidae
- Genus: Diastrophus
- Species: D. nebulosus

Binomial name
- Diastrophus nebulosus (Osten Sacken, 1861)

Synonyms
- Cynips rubi Bouche

= Diastrophus nebulosus =

Species of wasp

Diastrophus nebulosus is a species that forms galls. Its common name is the blackberry knot gall wasp. Its host plant is Rubus flagellaris.
