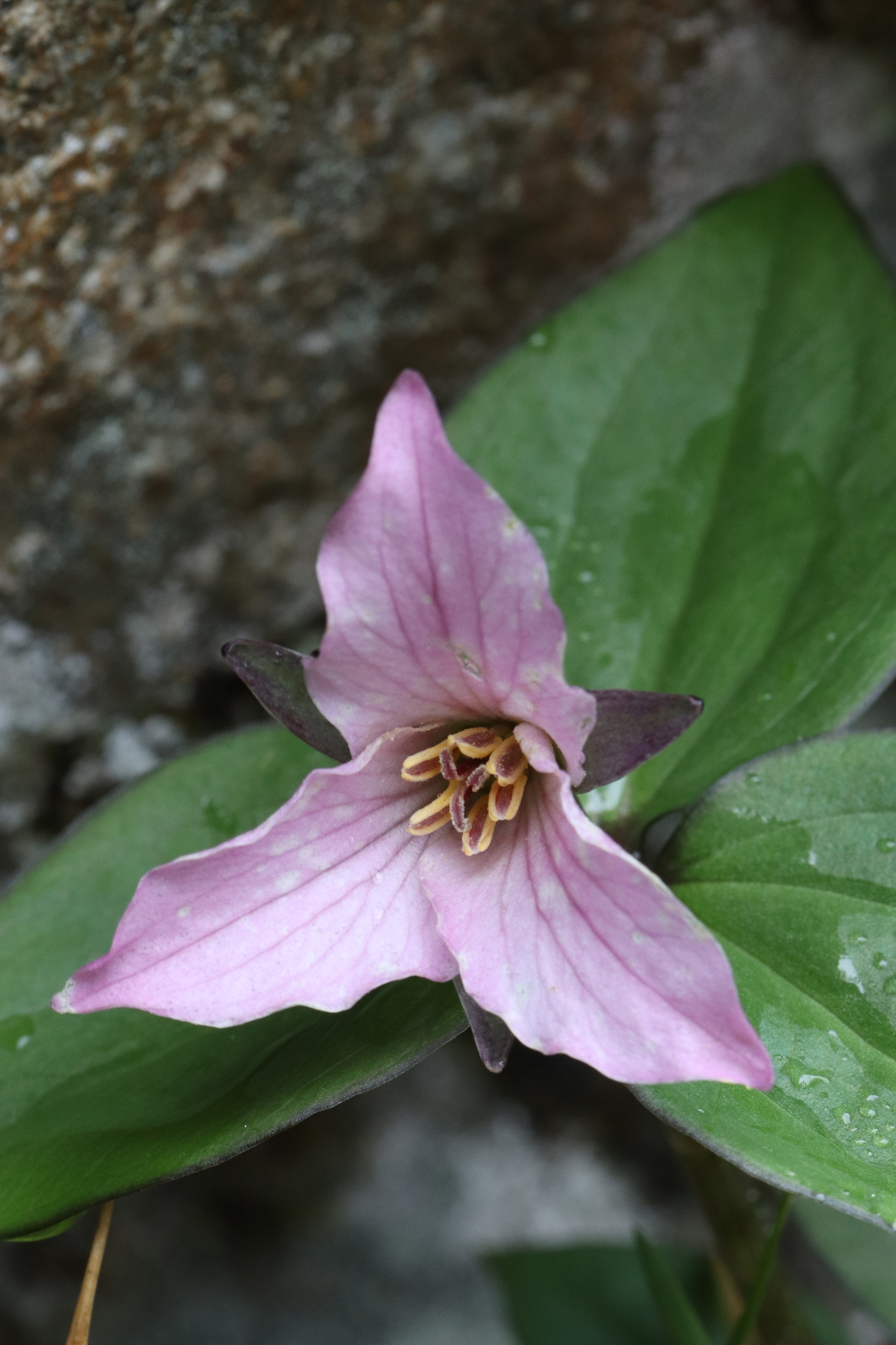
- British Columbia, Canada (April 2023)

Conservation status
- Vulnerable (NatureServe)

Scientific classification
- Kingdom: Plantae
- Clade: Tracheophytes
- Clade: Angiosperms
- Clade: Monocots
- Order: Liliales
- Family: Melanthiaceae
- Genus: Trillium
- Species: T. hibbersonii

Binomial name
- Trillium hibbersonii (T.M.C.Taylor & Szczaw.) D.O'Neill & S.B.Farmer

Synonyms
- Trillium hibbersonii: Trillium ovatum f. hibbersonii T.M.C.Taylor & Szczaw.; Trillium ovatum var. hibbersonii (T.M.C.Taylor & Szczaw.) G.W.Douglas & Pojar

= Trillium hibbersonii =

Species of flowering plant

Trillium hibbersonii is a species of flowering plant in the bunchflower family Melanthiaceae. The specific epithet hibbersonii honors the English Canadian surveyor John Arthur Hibberson (1881–1955) who first collected this plant in 1938 on Vancouver Island in British Columbia. Hibberson and his son propagated the trilliums, selling them to buyers in England and other European countries. In 1968, Leonard Wiley coined the Latin name Trillium hibbersonii, a name that has since been used by horticulturists without reservation.

When botanists finally became aware of Hibberson's trillium in 1974, it was circumscribed as a dwarf form of Trillium ovatum that occurs occasionally throughout the range of the species (which spans some nine states and provinces in western North America). Apart from Vancouver Island, no such trillium has ever been found. In 1995, Darlene O'Neill showed conclusively that Trillium "hibbersonii" is endemic to Vancouver Island, and moreover, it is distinct from Trillium ovatum. Her results languished for 25 years before it was finally concluded that not only is Trillium hibbersonii a distinct species, but it is also a member of the Erectum group, a group of species typified by Trillium erectum.

== Description ==
Trillium hibbersonii is a perennial, herbaceous plant with a reddish scape (stem) approximately 1.0 to 8.2 cm (0.39 to 3.23 in) tall. Like all trilliums, it has a whorl of three bracts (leaves) and a single trimerous flower with 3 sepals, 3 petals, two whorls of 3 stamens each, and 3 carpels (fused into a single ovary with 3 stigmas). The flower, which has a short stalk (called a pedicel), opens pink and becomes dark pink with age.

The bracts are 3.3 to 5.3 cm (1.3 to 2.1 in) long and 1.3 to 2.5 cm (0.51 to 0.98 in) wide, with reddish edges. The ratio of bract length to width is 2.3 on average, a value that remains constant throughout the season. The bract halves are often held at an angle to the longitudinal axis. The pedicel, which averages 1.1 cm (0.43 in) in length, is streaked with red and bent in such a way that the flower faces outward about 45 degrees. Like the bracts, the green sepals are reddish along the edges. The petals are ovate to elliptic, averaging 2.0 cm (0.79 in) in length. The stamens are about half the length of the petals but do not extend beyond the stigmas. The creamy-white filaments are shorter than the anthers, with the anther connective tissue being purple on its outward-facing side. The ovary is yellow-green to red-brown in color and ridged but not prominently winged in shape. The fruit is a berry-like capsule with irregular dehiscence.

== Taxonomy ==
Leonard Wiley invalidly described Trillium hibbersonii in 1968. A few years later, in 1974, Taylor and Szczawinski described a dwarf form of Trillium ovatum that grows on the sea cliffs of Vancouver Island in British Columbia. Known as Trillium ovatum f. hibbersonii T.M.C.Taylor & Szczaw., the "dwarf trillium" was recognized as a variety in 2001. It was finally elevated to species rank by Darlene M. O'Neill and Susan B. Farmer in 2020.

As of March 2023, most authorities recognize the name Trillium hibbersonii (T.M.C.Taylor & Szczaw.) D.O'Neill & S.B.Farmer, but a few still regard the taxon as a form of Trillium ovatum. Trillium hibbersonii is not related to Trillium ovatum. Based on molecular phylogenetic studies, Trillium hibbersonii is the first diverging (basal) branch of the Erectum group, a group of species typified by Trillium erectum. As such, it is the only member of that group in western North America.

== Distribution ==
Trillium hibbersonii is found on the west coast of Vancouver Island in British Columbia. As originally described, it was thought to occur occasionally throughout the range of the species, but that is no longer believed to be true. There are just four known populations of T. hibbersonii, all on Vancouver Island, which makes the species a source of conservation concern.

== Ecology ==
In general, Trillium species are myrmecochorous, that is, ants facilitate seed dispersal. Trillium seeds have a white fleshy appendage called an elaiosome, which attracts ants. Since each seed of Trillium hibbersonii has an attached elaiosome, presumably its seeds are dispersed by ants as well.

Once dispersed, Trillium seeds exhibit a type of dormancy called morphophysiological dormancy, sometimes called "double dormancy", which requires two full winters to completely break dormancy. Apparently Trillium hibbersonii does not have this requirement. In one experiment, 90% of plants broke dormancy after a single cold period.

== Conservation ==
The global conservation status of Trillium hibbersonii is vulnerable (G3). The Committee on the Status of Endangered Wildlife in Canada designated Trillium hibbersonii as Threatened in December 2023.

== Bibliography ==
- Case, Frederick W. [in Spanish]; Case, Roberta B. (1997). Trilliums. Portland, Oregon: Timber Press. ISBN 978-0-88192-374-2.
- Lampley, Jayne A. (2021). A systematic and biogeographic study of Trillium (Melanthiaceae) (PhD). University of Tennessee.
- Lampley, Jayne A.; Gereau, Roy; Floden, Aaron; Schilling, Edward E. (2022-07-05). "A revised subgeneric classification of Trillium (Parideae, Melanthiaceae)". Phytotaxa. 552 (5): 278–286. Bibcode:2022Phytx.552..278L. doi:10.11646/phytotaxa.552.5.1. S2CID 250368253.
- O'Neill, Darlene M. (1995). Taxonomic study of Trillium ovatum forma hibbersonii (MS). University of British Columbia.
- O'Neill, Darlene M.; Farmer, Susan B.; Floden, Aaron; Lampley, Jayne; Schilling, Edward E. (2020). "Trillium hibbersonii (Melanthiaceae), a phylogenetically distinct species from western North America". Phytotaxa. 436 (2): 193–195. Bibcode:2020Phytx.436..193O. doi:10.11646/phytotaxa.436.2.9.
- Wayman, Kjirsten A.; Wright, Alexander J.; Renner, Maralyn; Floden, Aaron; Lampley, Jayne A.; Farmer, Susan B.; Schilling, Edward E. (6 March 2024). "New insights into systematics of the Trillium ovatum complex". Madroño. 70 (3): 158–171. doi:10.3120/0024-9637-70.3.158.
