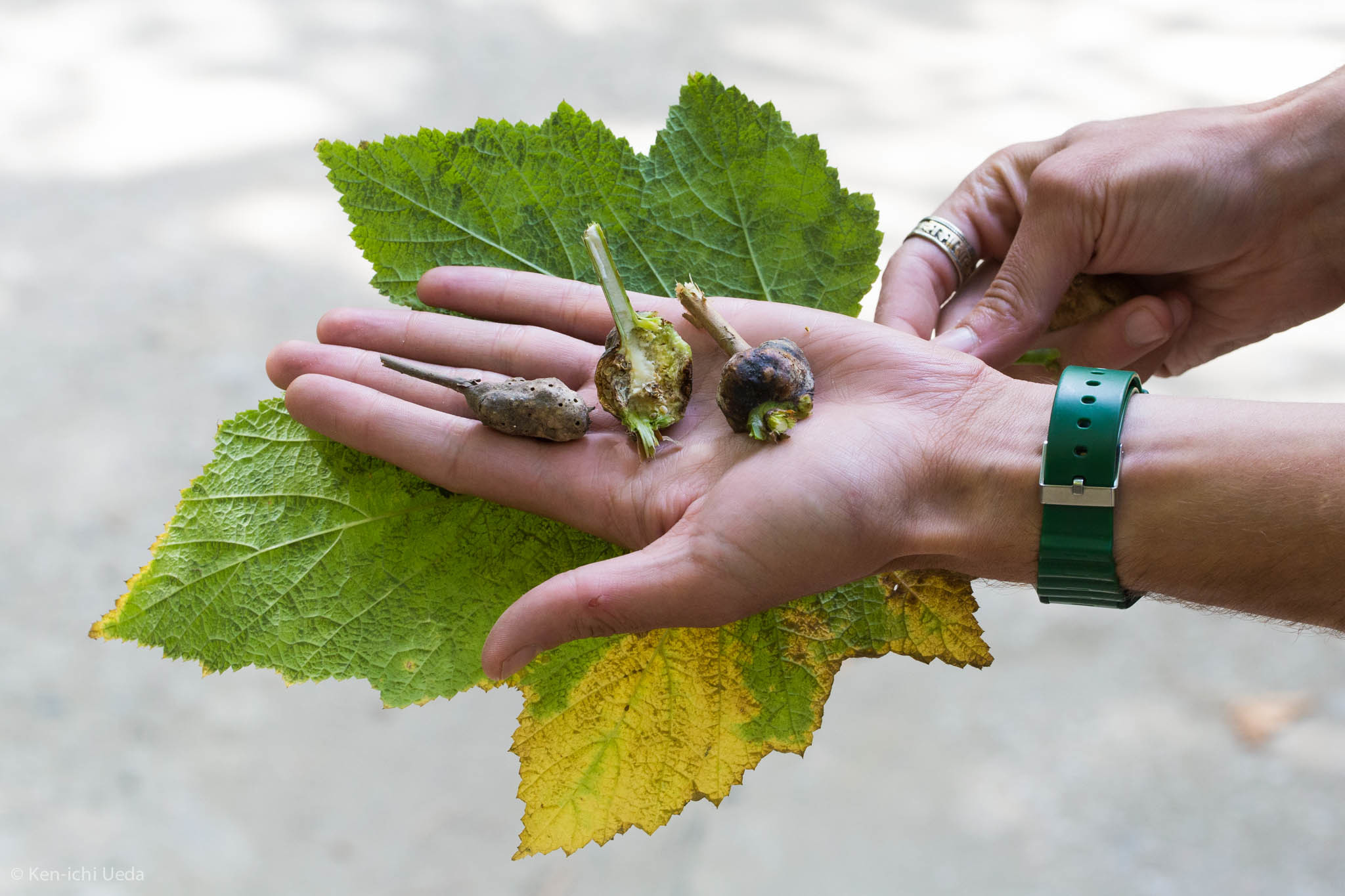

Scientific classification
- Kingdom: Animalia
- Phylum: Arthropoda
- Class: Insecta
- Order: Hymenoptera
- Family: Cynipidae
- Genus: Diastrophus
- Species: D. kincaidii

Binomial name
- Diastrophus kincaidii Gillette, 1893

= Diastrophus kincaidii =

Species of gall-inducing wasp

Diastrophus kincaidii, also known as the thimbleberry gallmaker wasp, is a species of cynipid wasp that induces integral stem galls on thimbleberry plants. Galls induced by this wasp are the foundation of a derivative ecosystem, supporting a weevil and at least nine parasitic wasps.
