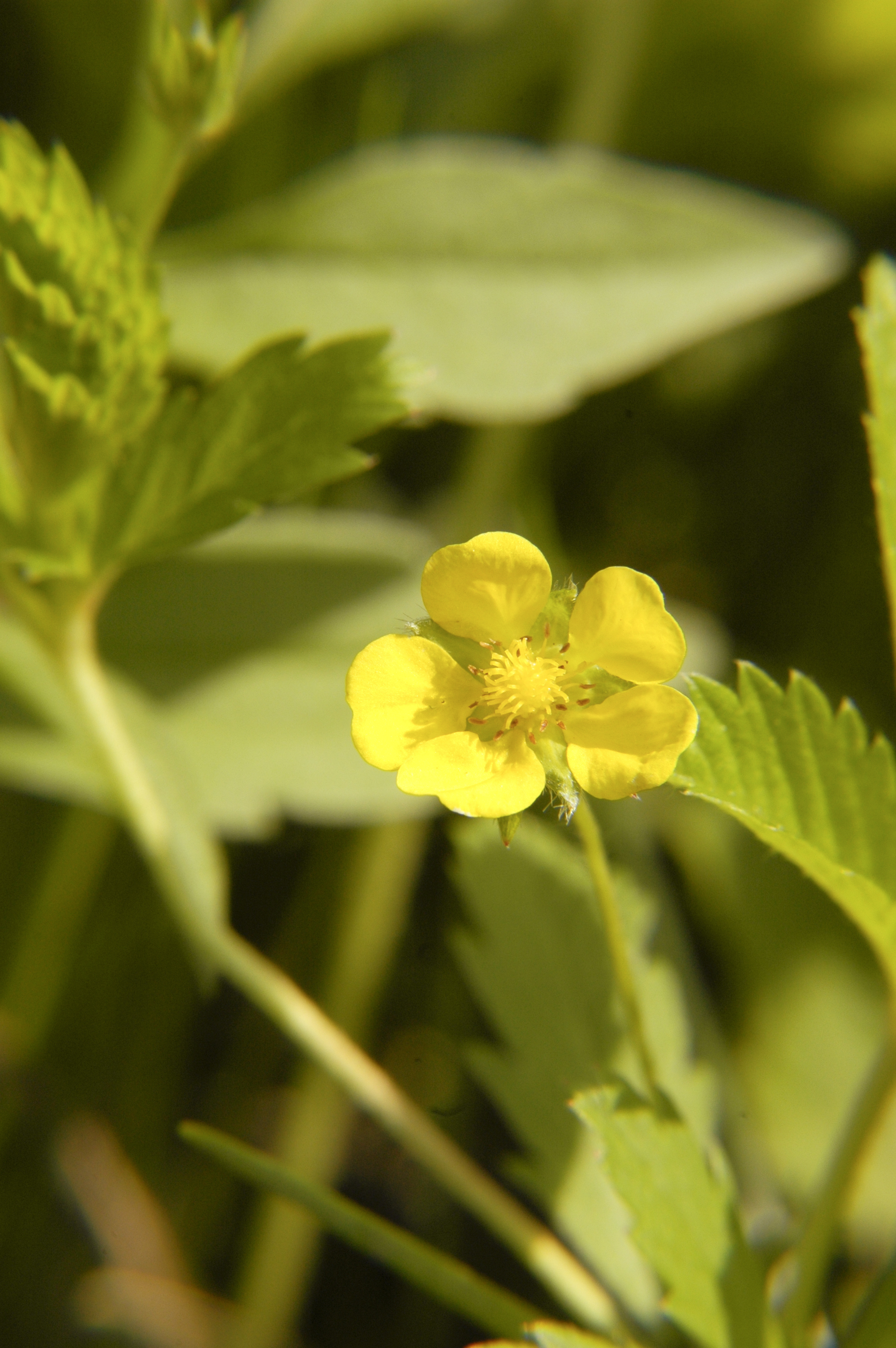

Conservation status
- Secure (NatureServe)

Scientific classification
- Kingdom: Plantae
- Clade: Tracheophytes
- Clade: Angiosperms
- Clade: Eudicots
- Clade: Rosids
- Order: Rosales
- Family: Rosaceae
- Genus: Potentilla
- Species: P. simplex

Binomial name
- Potentilla simplex Michx.

= Potentilla simplex =

Species of flowering plant

Potentilla simplex, also known as common cinquefoil or old-field five-fingers or oldfield cinquefoil, is a perennial herb in the Rosaceae (rose) family native to eastern North America from Ontario, Quebec, and Labrador south to Texas, Alabama, and panhandle Florida.

Potentilla simplex is a familiar plant with prostrate stems that root at nodes, with yellow flowers and 5-parted palmately pinnate leaves arising from stolons (runners) on separate stalks. Complete flowers bearing 5 yellow petals (about 4–10 mm long) bloom from March to June. It bears seed from April to July. It is commonly found in woodlands, fields, and disturbed areas. Along with Potentilla canadensis, the plant is an indicator of impoverished soil as well as the host species for the cinquefoil bud gall wasp Diastrophus potentillae.

Pollinators include mason bees, small carpenter bees, cuckoo bees, halictid bees, syrphid flies, tachinid flies, blow flies, and others. Less common pollinators are wasps and butterflies. Rabbits and groundhogs eat the foliage.

Young shoots and leaves are edible as a salad or pot herb.
