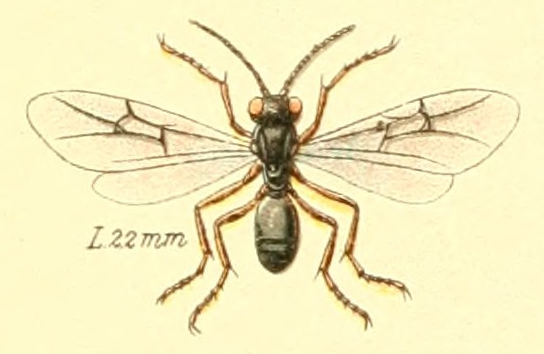

Scientific classification
- Kingdom: Animalia
- Phylum: Arthropoda
- Class: Insecta
- Order: Hymenoptera
- Family: Cynipidae
- Genus: Diastrophus
- Species: D. rubi

Binomial name
- Diastrophus rubi (Bouché, 1834)

Synonyms
- List: Cynips rubi Bouché, 1834; Andricus hartigi Marshall, 1867; Diastrophus aphidivorus Cameron, 1889; Diastrophus ibericus Tavares, 1927; Diastrophus aphidivorus; Diastrophus hartigi; Diastrophus ibericus

= Diastrophus rubi =

Species of wasp

Diastrophus rubi is a species of gall wasp in the family Cynipidae that live on the stems of bramble (Rubus species). The insect was first described by the German entomologist Peter Friedrich Bouché in 1834 and is found in Europe.

== Description ==
=== Gall ===
Some herbivorous insects create their own microhabitats by forming an abnormal growth, in this case a gall. Both upright and prostrate stems can be galled and they are often low down and hidden by vegetation. They tend to be most noticeable in the winter when brambles have lost some of their foliage. The gall is an elongate swelling in the stems of brambles; 2–15 cm long and circa 1 cm wide. They are often curved or they cause the stem to bend and can contain up to 200 spherical swellings. Each swelling is a chamber containing a white wasp larva. Larvae overwinter in the gall and adults emerge the following spring. Galls can remain on the plants for many years, are often silvery and numerous exit holes can be seen.

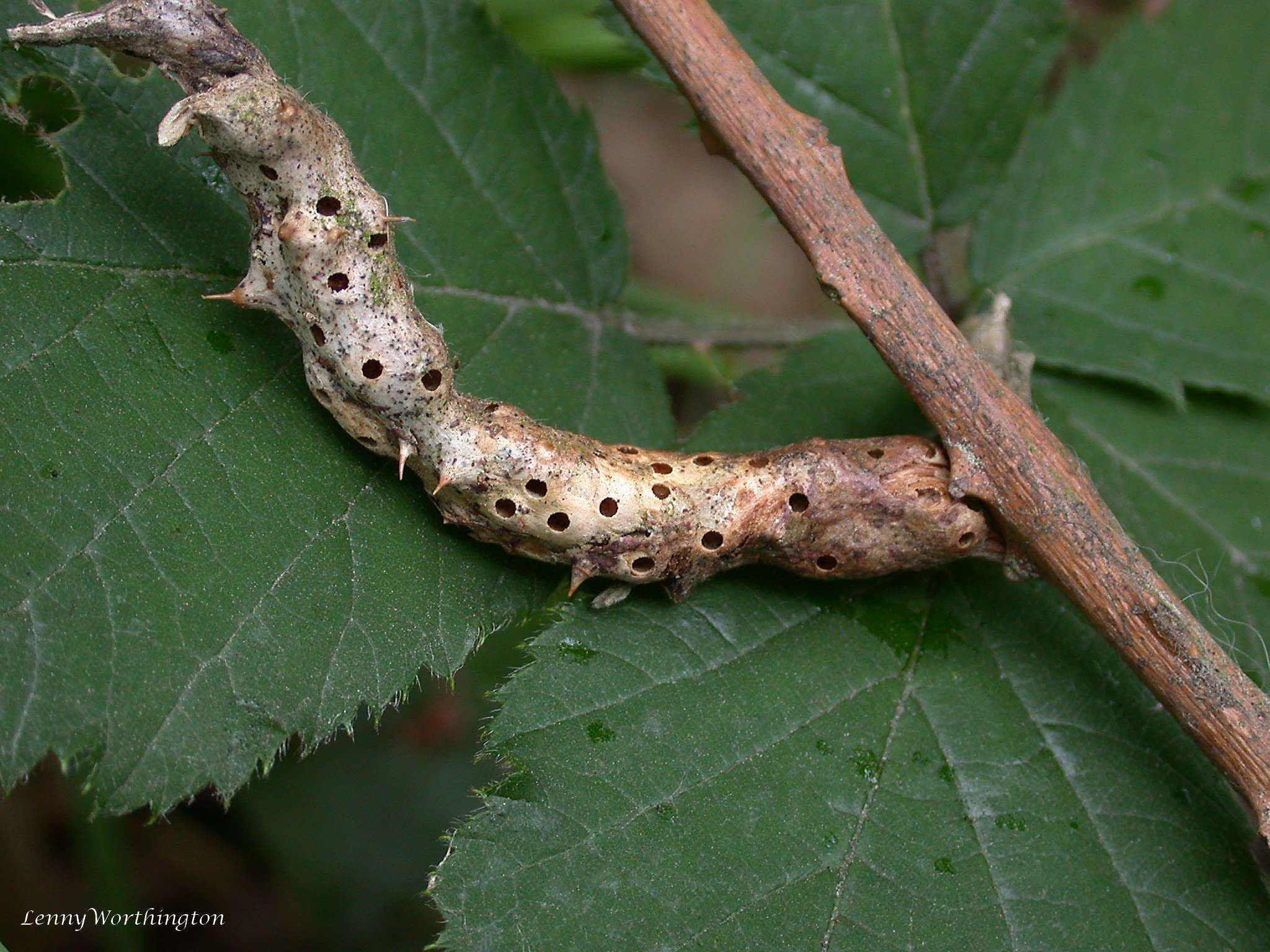

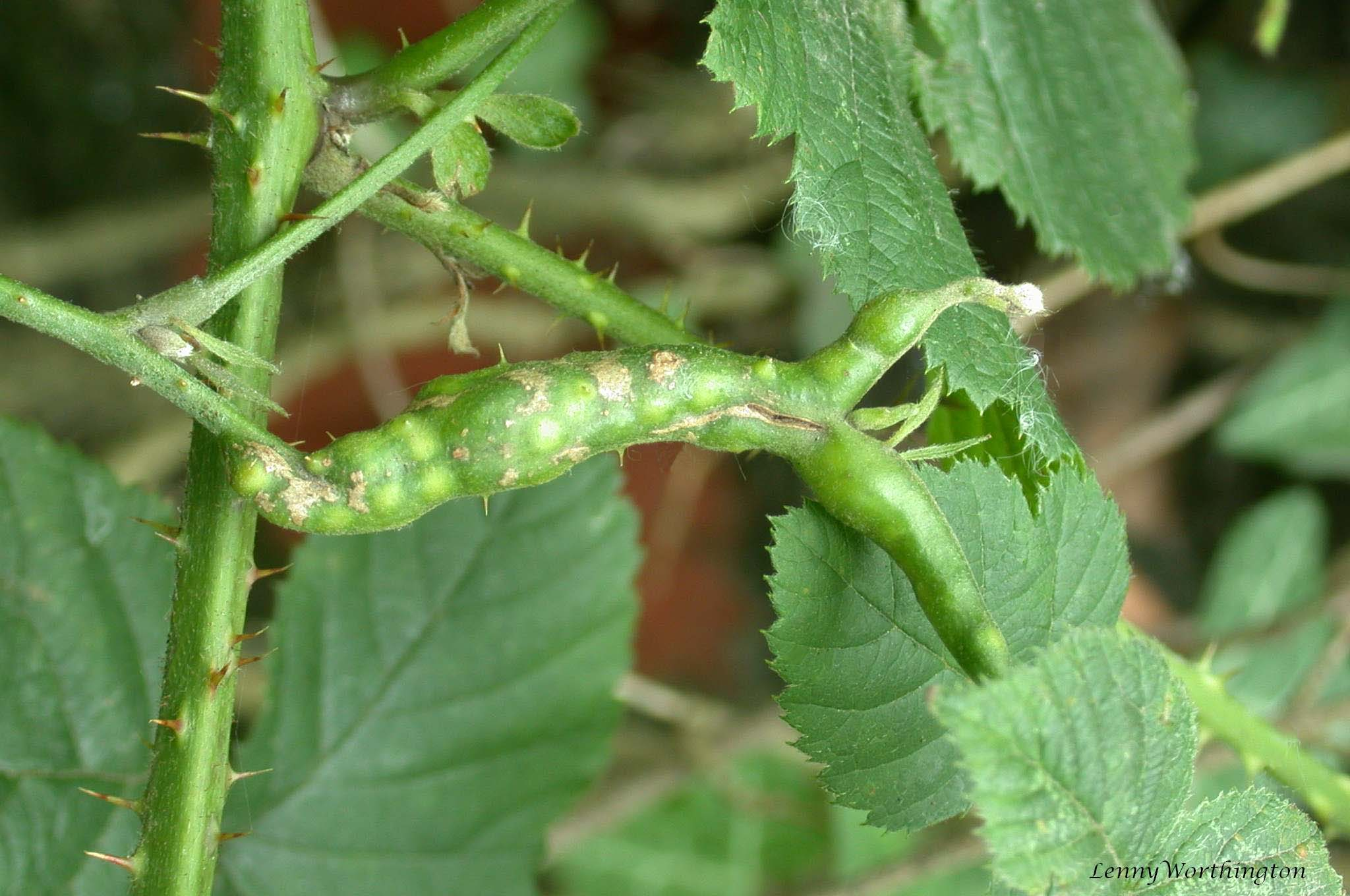

Galls have been recorded on the following brambles:-

- Rubus caesius – European dewberry
- Rubus fruticosus – bramble
- Rubus gillotii
- Rubus idaeus – red raspberry
- Rubus praecox
- Rubus seebergensis
- Rubus sulcatus
- Rubus ulmifolius – elmleaf blackberry

== Distribution ==
Diastrophus rubi has been found in the following countries; Austria, Denmark, France, Germany, Great Britain (most common in the south and east), Hungary, Spain and Sweden.
