= Diastrophus potentillae =

Scientific classification
- Kingdom: Animalia
- Phylum: Arthropoda
- Class: Insecta
- Order: Hymenoptera
- Family: Cynipidae
- Genus: Diastrophus
- Species: D. potentillae

Binomial name
- Diastrophus potentillae Bassett, 1864

Species of wasp

Diastrophus potentillae, also known as the cinquefoil bud gall wasp, is a species of gall wasp in the family Cynipidae. It is found in eastern North America. It makes galls on the stems of Potentilla canadensis and P. simplex.
