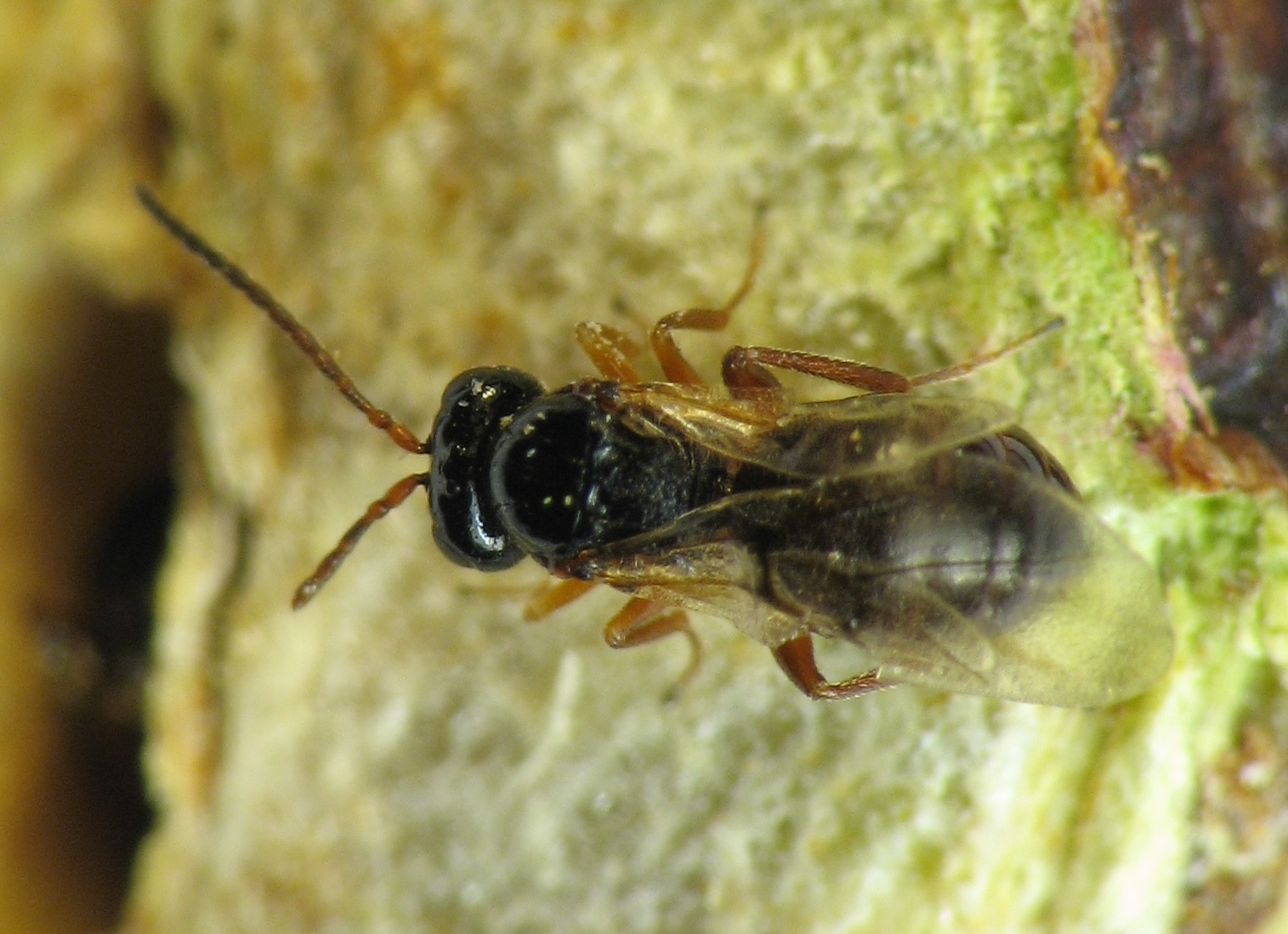
- Diastrophus nebulosus in raspberry gall

Scientific classification
- Kingdom: Animalia
- Phylum: Arthropoda
- Clade: Pancrustacea
- Class: Insecta
- Order: Hymenoptera
- Family: Cynipidae
- Genus: Diastrophus; Hartig, 1840

Synonyms
- Gonaspis Ashmead, 1897

= Diastrophus =

Genus of wasps

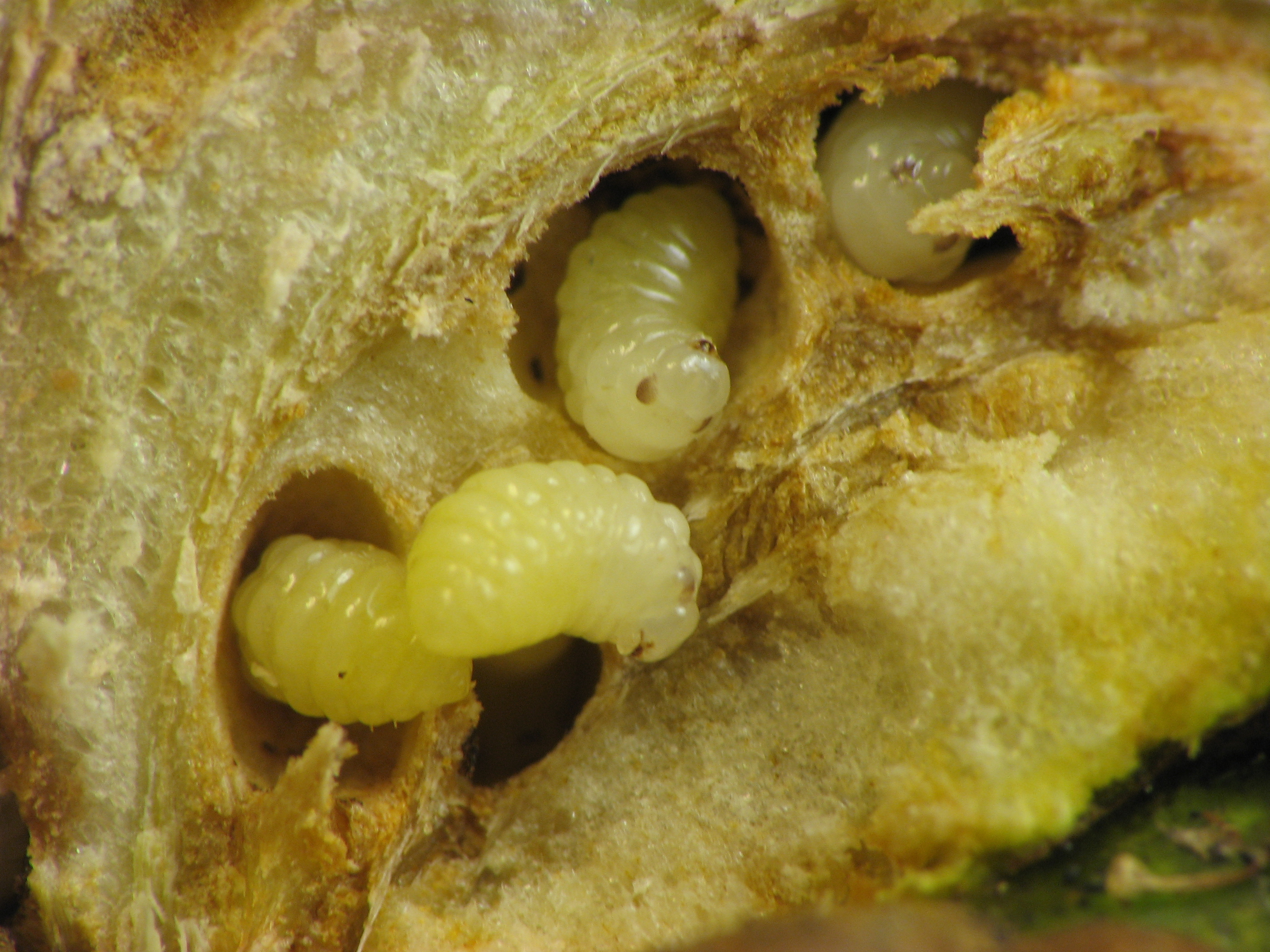
Diastrophus nebulosus larvae in gall

Diastrophus is a genus of gall wasps in the family Cynipidae. There are at least 23 described species in Diastrophus.

== Species ==
The species in the genus Diastrophus include the following:

- Diastrophus brasiliensis Oliveira & Melo, 2025
- Diastrophus colombianus Nieves-Aldrey, 2013 ( gall on Rubus glaucus)
- Diastrophus cuscutaeformis^{b} (blackberry seed gall wasp)
- Diastrophus emeiensis Hu, Nieves-Aldrey, Zhang & Fang
- Diastrophus fragariae Beutenmuller, 1915
- Diastrophus japonicus Wachi et al, 2013
- Diastrophus kincaidii Gillette, 1893^{b}
- Diastrophus mayri Reinhard, 1876^{g}
- Diastrophus nebulosus^{b} (blackberry knot gall wasp)
- Diastrophus potentillae Bassett, 1864^{i c g b}
- Diastrophus renai Davis & Nastasi, 2024
- Diastrophus rubi (Bouché, 1834)^{i c g}
- Diastrophus turgidus Bassett, 1870^{i c g}
- Diastrophus wushei Davis & Nastasi, 2024

Data sources: i = ITIS, c = Catalogue of Life, g = GBIF, b = Bugguide.net
