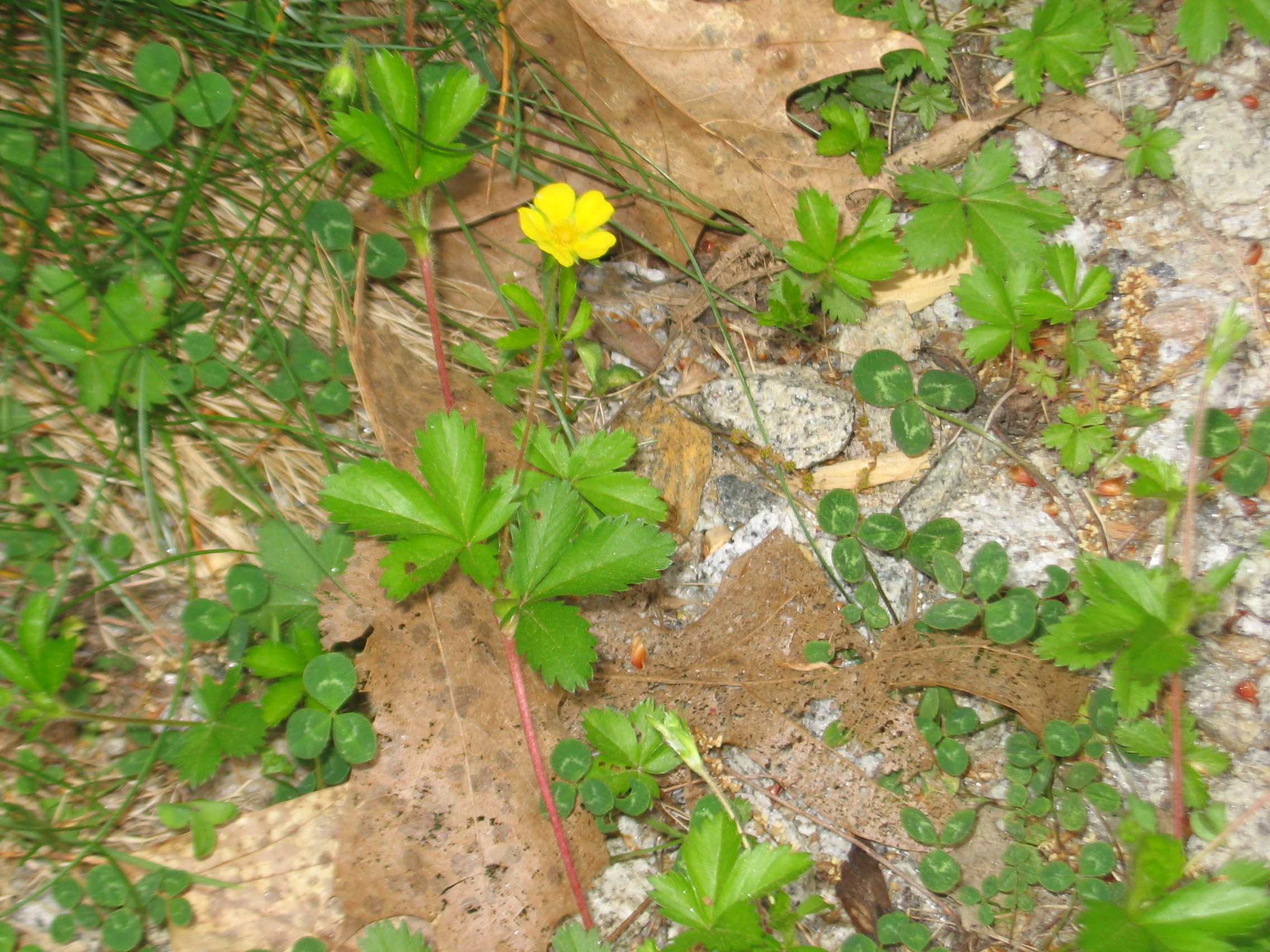

Scientific classification
- Kingdom: Plantae
- Clade: Tracheophytes
- Clade: Angiosperms
- Clade: Eudicots
- Clade: Rosids
- Order: Rosales
- Family: Rosaceae
- Genus: Potentilla
- Species: P. canadensis

Binomial name
- Potentilla canadensis L.

= Potentilla canadensis =

Species of flowering plant

Potentilla canadensis, the dwarf cinquefoil, is a species of cinquefoil (genus Potentilla) native to North America.

The Haudenosaunee take a pounded infusion of the roots as an antidiarrheal. The Natchez give the plant as a drug for those believed to be bewitched.

Along with Potentilla simplex, the plant is an indicator of impoverished soil as well as the host species for the cinquefoil bud gall wasp Diastrophus potentillae.
