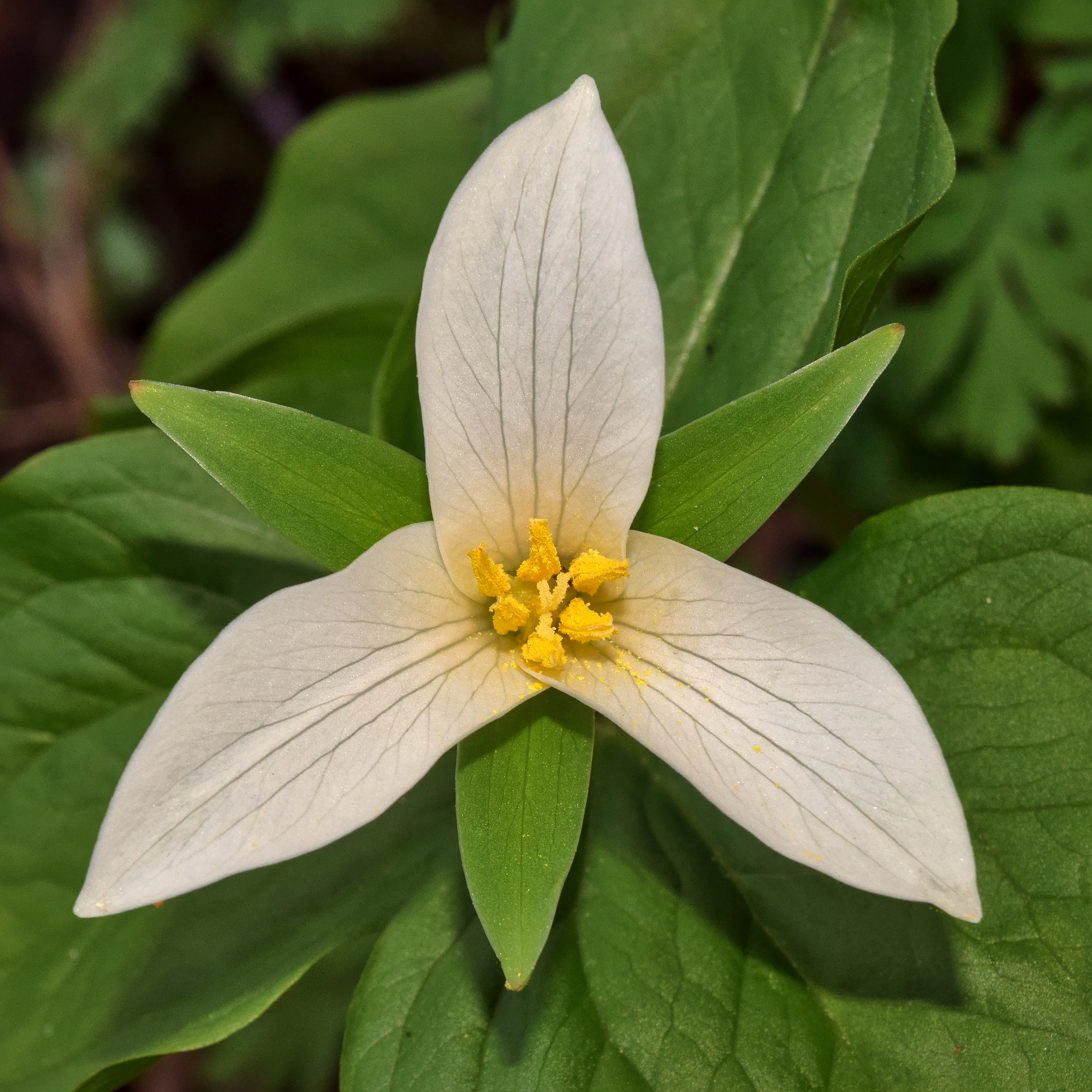
- Pacific trillium blooming in Aldergrove Regional Park (British Columbia, Canada).

Conservation status
- Secure (NatureServe)

Scientific classification
- Kingdom: Plantae
- Clade: Tracheophytes
- Clade: Angiosperms
- Clade: Monocots
- Order: Liliales
- Family: Melanthiaceae
- Genus: Trillium
- Species: T. ovatum

Binomial name
- Trillium ovatum Pursh

Synonyms
- T. ovatum var. oettingeri: Trillium ovatum subsp. oettingeri Munz & Thorne; T. ovatum var. ovatum: Trillium californicum Kellogg; Trillium obovatum Hook.; Trillium ovatum f. maculosum Case & R.B.Case; Trillium ovatum var. stenosepalum R.R.Gates; Trillium venosum R.R.Gates

= Trillium ovatum =

Species of flowering plant

Trillium ovatum, commonly known as the Pacific trillium, western wakerobin, western white trillium, or western trillium, is a species of flowering plant in the family Melanthiaceae. It is the most widespread and abundant trillium in western North America. Its type specimen was gathered by Meriwether Lewis during the return trip of the Lewis and Clark Expedition in 1806.

== Description ==
The most widespread of the western North American trilliums, Trillium ovatum varies greatly within its range. Despite this, T. ovatum closely resembles the eastern T. grandiflorum. Apart from geographic location, the two species are not easily distinguished.

Trillium ovatum is a perennial herbaceous plant that spreads by means of underground rhizomes. At maturity, each plant has one or two flowering scapes, each 20 to 50 cm (8 to 19.5 in) in length. The specific epithet ovatum means "egg-shaped", which refers to the petals, not the leaves. The latter are generally ovate-rhombic, 7 to 12 cm (3 to 5 in) long by 5 to 20 cm (2 to 8 in) wide.

The flower sits on a pedicel 2 to 6 cm (1 to 2.5 in) in length. The sepals are 15 to 50 mm (0.59 to 1.97 in) long and 6 to 20 mm (0.24 to 0.79 in) wide, while the petals are 15 to 70 mm (0.59 to 2.76 in) long and 10 to 40 mm (0.39 to 1.57 in) wide. Typically the flower opens white and becomes pink with age, but in the Smith River Canyon area of northern California and southern Oregon, the petals become almost barn-red.

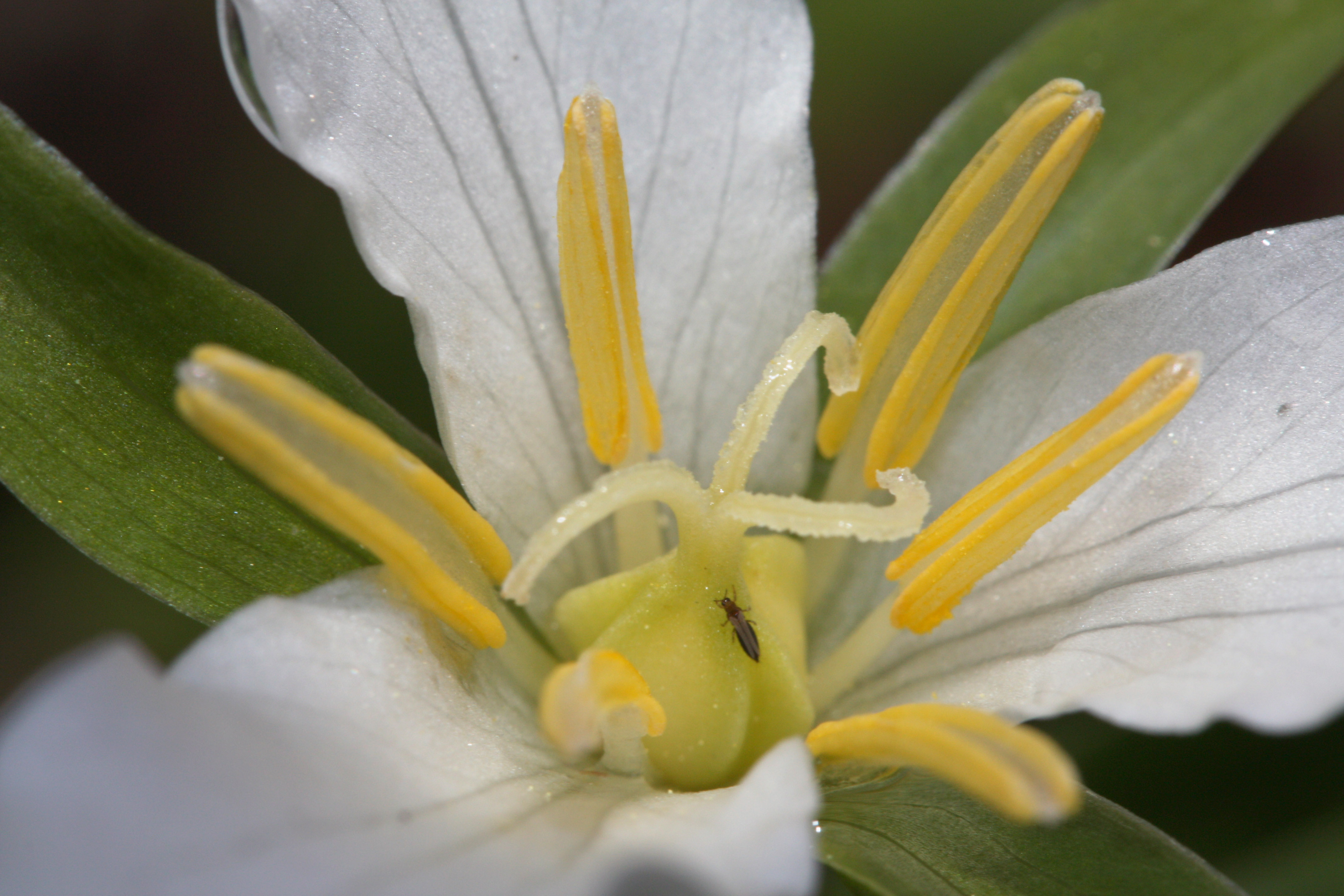
Supported by thin white filaments, the yellow anthers are 4–16 mm long

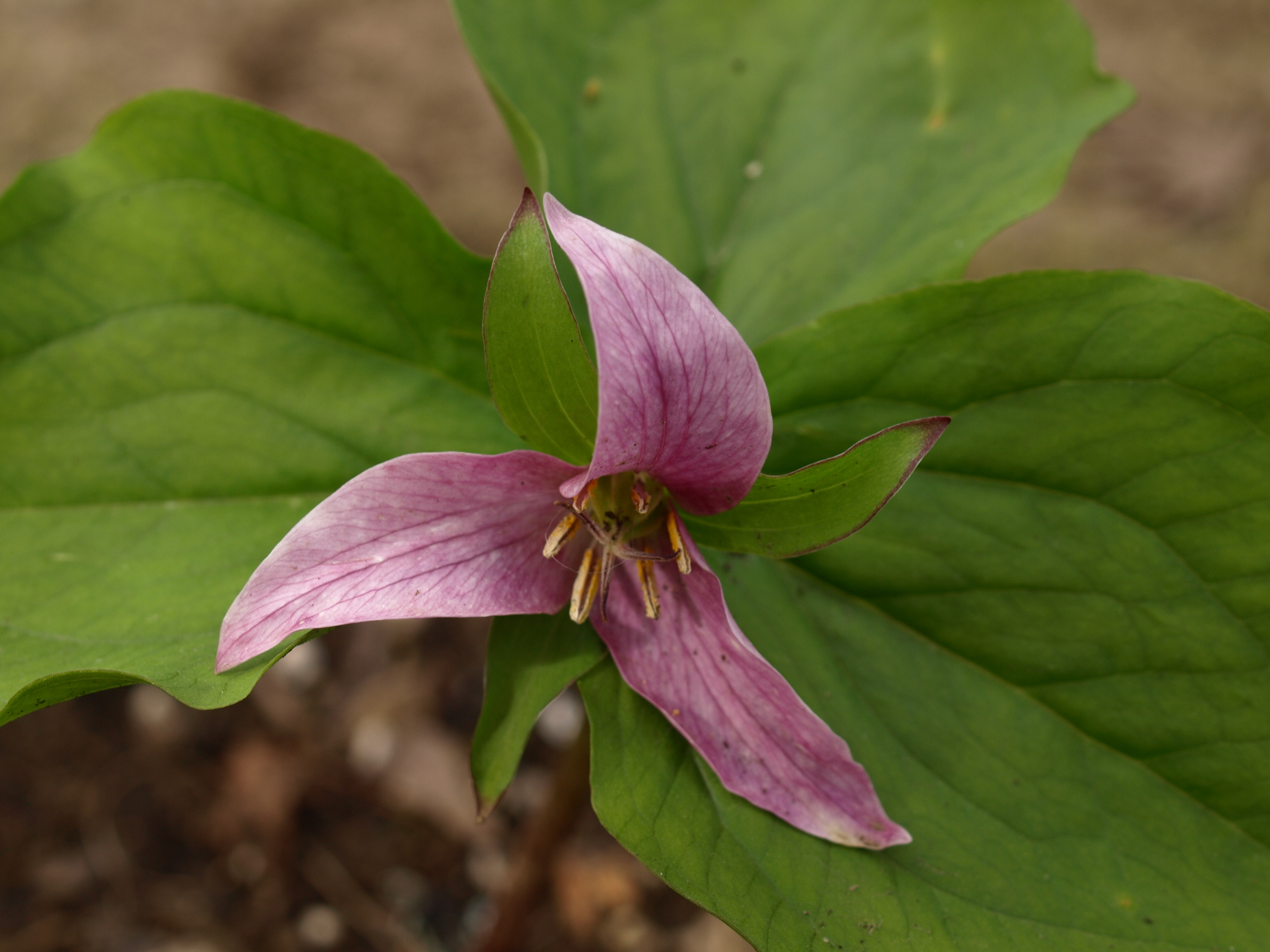
The flower starts white, but often becomes pink as it matures

== Taxonomy ==
Trillium ovatum was first described by the German–American botanist Frederick Traugott Pursh in 1813. The type specimen for this species was gathered by Meriwether Lewis along the Columbia River during the return trip of the Lewis and Clark Expedition in 1806.

As of April 2024, the following varieties are accepted by Plants of the World Online in addition to Trillium ovatum Pursh:

- Trillium ovatum var. oettingeri (Munz & Thorne) Case
- Trillium ovatum var. ovatum

Trillium ovatum var. oettingeri was first described as Trillium ovatum subsp. oettingeri by the American botanists Philip Alexander Munz and Robert Folger Thorne in 1973. The subspecific name oettingeri honors Frederick W. Oettinger who collected the type specimen in July 1967. The type is one of about 1,500 specimens collected by Oettinger in the Marble Mountain Wilderness of the Salmon Mountains in western Siskiyou County, California. Hence Oettinger's trillium is also known as the Salmon Mountains wakerobin.

Trillium ovatum var. oettingeri itself was treated by Frederick W. Case Jr. in Flora of North America in 2002. Unlike the typical variety ovatum, variety oettingeri has leaves with short petioles and linear flower petals. In 2024, the taxon was recommended at species rank based on morphological data and phylogenetic analysis.

Trillium ovatum var. stenosepalum was described by the Canadian-born geneticist Reginald Ruggles Gates in 1917. Its type specimen was collected in Helena, Montana in 1891. The epithet stenosepalum means "narrow-sepalled", the primary difference between it and typical Trillium ovatum. As of April 2024, Trillium ovatum var. stenosepalum R.R.Gates is a synonym for Trillium ovatum var. ovatum, but recent evidence suggests the taxon may be a distinct species.

Trillium ovatum f. maculosum Case & R.B.Case refers to a form with mottled leaves that occurs in northern California. Its type specimen was collected in Mendocino County in 1996. It is the only reported instance of a pedicellate Trillium with mottled leaves. There is no evidence that f. maculosum is distinct from typical Trillium ovatum.

The names Trillium ovatum f. hibbersonii T.M.C.Taylor & Szczaw. and Trillium ovatum var. hibbersonii (T.M.C.Taylor & Szczaw.) G.W.Douglas & Pojar are synonyms for Trillium hibbersonii (T.M.C.Taylor & Szczaw.) D.O'Neill & S.B.Farmer. Despite its provenance, Trillium hibbersonii is not related to Trillium ovatum, but rather it is a member of subgenus Trillium, the Trillium erectum group.

== Distribution and habitat ==
Trillium ovatum sensu lato is the most widespread and abundant trillium in western North America. It ranges from Monterey County in central California northward throughout the California Coast Ranges to Vancouver Island and southwestern British Columbia. It also occurs in the Rocky Mountains from southeastern British Columbia and the tip of southwestern Alberta, southward through Idaho, eastern Washington and northeastern Oregon, and southeastward through western Montana. There is a small, isolated population in northern Colorado and southern Wyoming. It is often found growing in coniferous and mixed coniferous-deciduous forests, in and around alder thickets and shrubs. Along the California coast, it is commonly found under coast redwood and mixed evergreen forest. At Lolo Pass, Montana, it grows under spruce and Douglas fir in ravines along mountain streams. It does not grow in the dry chaparral inland from the redwood and Douglas fir forests of California and Oregon, nor on ridges where the trees are sparse.

Trillium ovatum var. oettingeri is endemic to a relatively small region in northwestern California. It occurs primarily in the Salmon Mountains, a subrange of the Klamath Mountains, in southwestern Siskiyou County, northern Trinity County, and northeastern Humboldt County. Smaller populations are known to occur in the Cascade Range east of Mount Shasta straddling the border between Siskiyou County and Shasta County. It is found growing at elevations from 4,000–6,300 feet (1,200–1,900 m), often in cold mountain streams, on the banks of mountain lakes, or at the base of cliffs where late summer snow patches linger.

The distribution of Trillium ovatum var. stenosepalum is inconsistently reported in the literature. After examining specimens from Montana, Idaho, Oregon, Washington, and California, Gates (1917) deduced that the taxon ranged from "western Montana and southern Washington to middle California (Santa Cruz Mountains)". More recently, Wayman et al. (2024) concluded that the taxon "occurs in the Rocky Mountains" of Idaho, Montana, Washington, and Colorado, with the caveat that "additional field and lab work are necessary".

== Ecology ==
Flowers bloom late February in the southern part of its range, and in March or April elsewhere. Citizen science observations of flowering plants of this species peak during the first week of April. For comparison, when Trillium grandiflorum is fully open in eastern North America, T. ovatum is already fading in western North America. Apparently T. ovatum lacks sufficient winter hardiness to flourish east of the continental divide.

The life-cycle stages of T. ovatum include a cotyledon stage, a one-leaf vegetative stage, a three-leaf vegetative (juvenile) stage, a three-leaf reproductive (flowering) stage, and a three-leaf nonflowering regressive stage. An example of the latter involves a transition from the three-leaf flowering stage to a three-leaf nonflowering regressive stage. Approximately one of every four reproductive plants regresses to a nonflowering state in any given year. Under the right conditions, individuals may undergo extended dormancy, that is, they may cease above-ground growth for one or more years. In western Montana, dormancy was observed in all adult stage classes, with most plants returning to above ground status in a year or two, although some plants exhibited dormancy for 3–5 years.

== Conservation ==
In 2019, the global conservation status of Trillium ovatum was determined to be Secure (G5). At the same time, varieties Trillium ovatum var. oettingeri and var. ovatum were ranked Apparently Secure (T4) and Secure (T5), respectively. All known occurrences of variety oettingeri fall within protected areas in northern California but since the effects of wildfire and climate change are unknown, continued monitoring of existing populations is recommended.

== Uses ==
Trillium ovatum is occasionally cultivated outside its native range as far north as Sitka, Alaska. As a cultivated plant, it usually does not perform well since it lacks the winter hardiness of other garden plants.

== Gallery ==
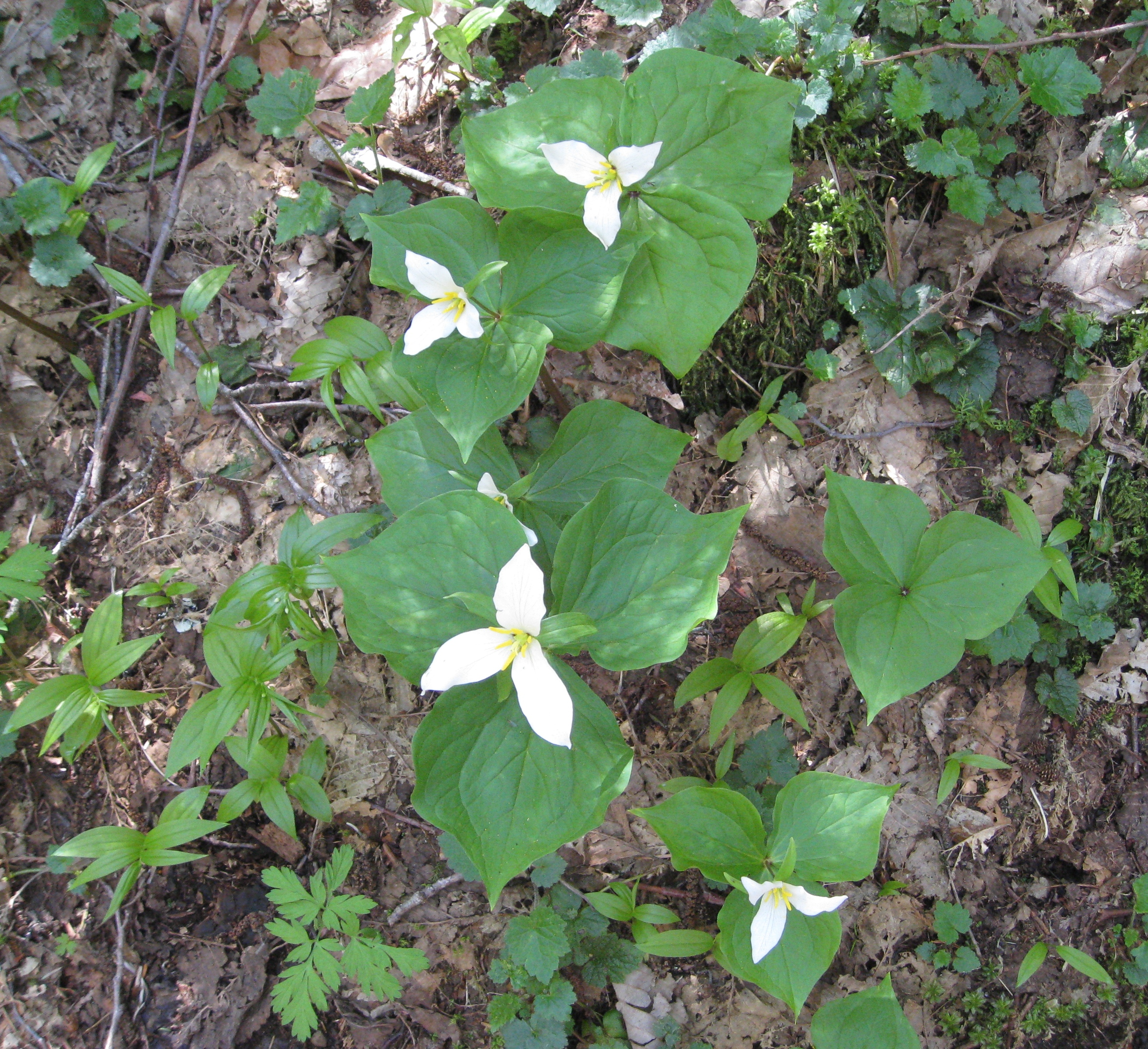
Cluster of white flowers in Washington State.

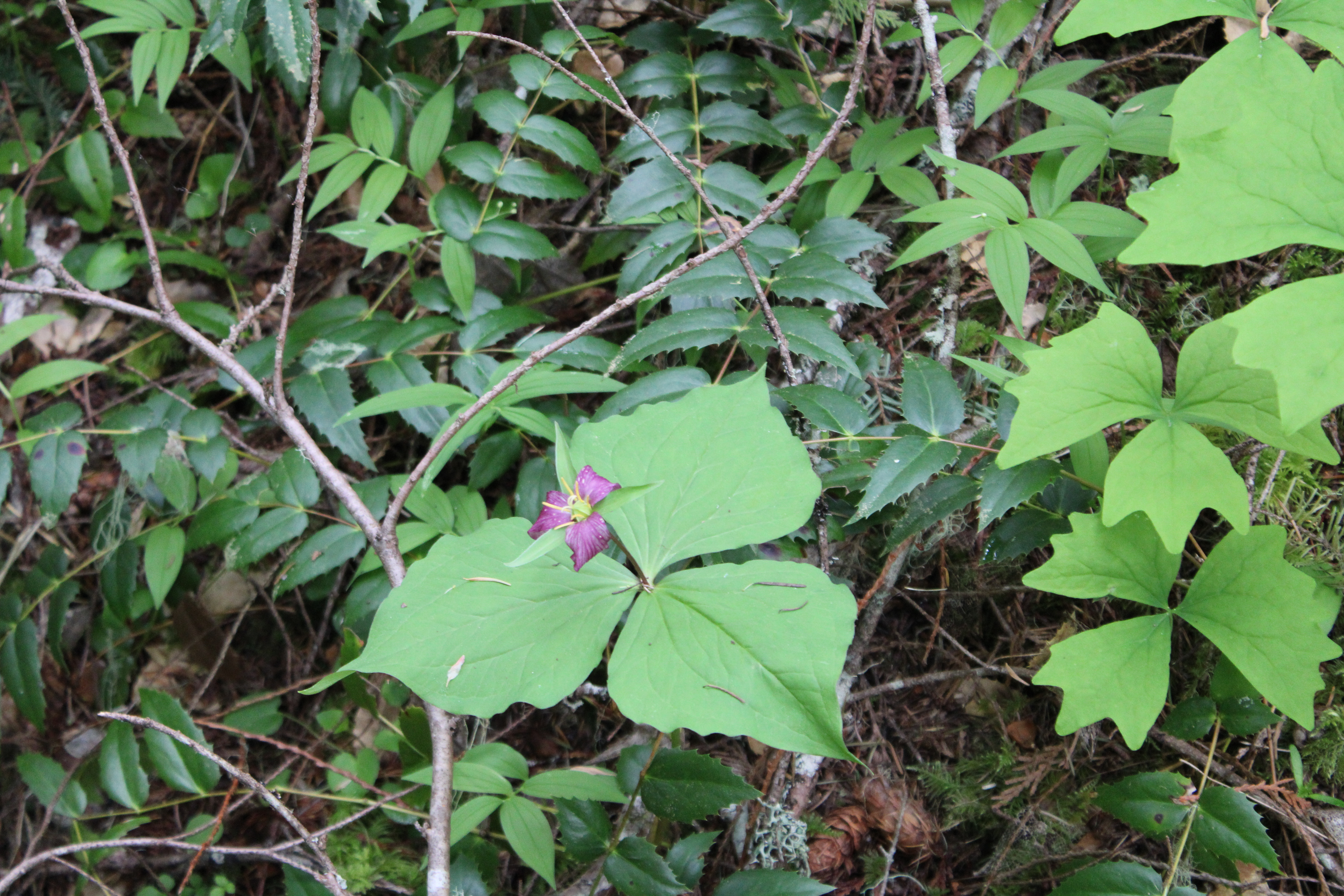
Purple flower

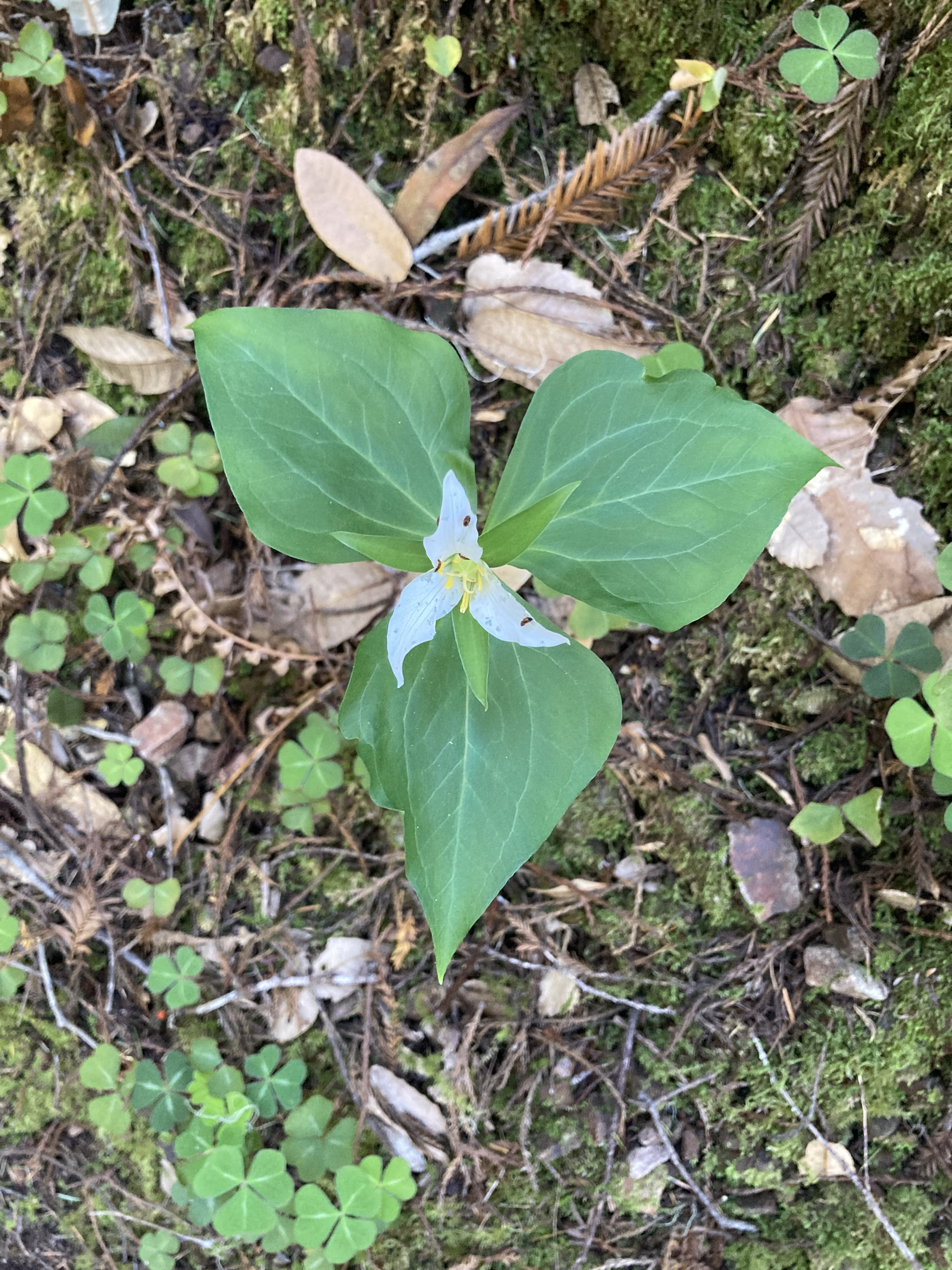
A white flower in Sonoma.

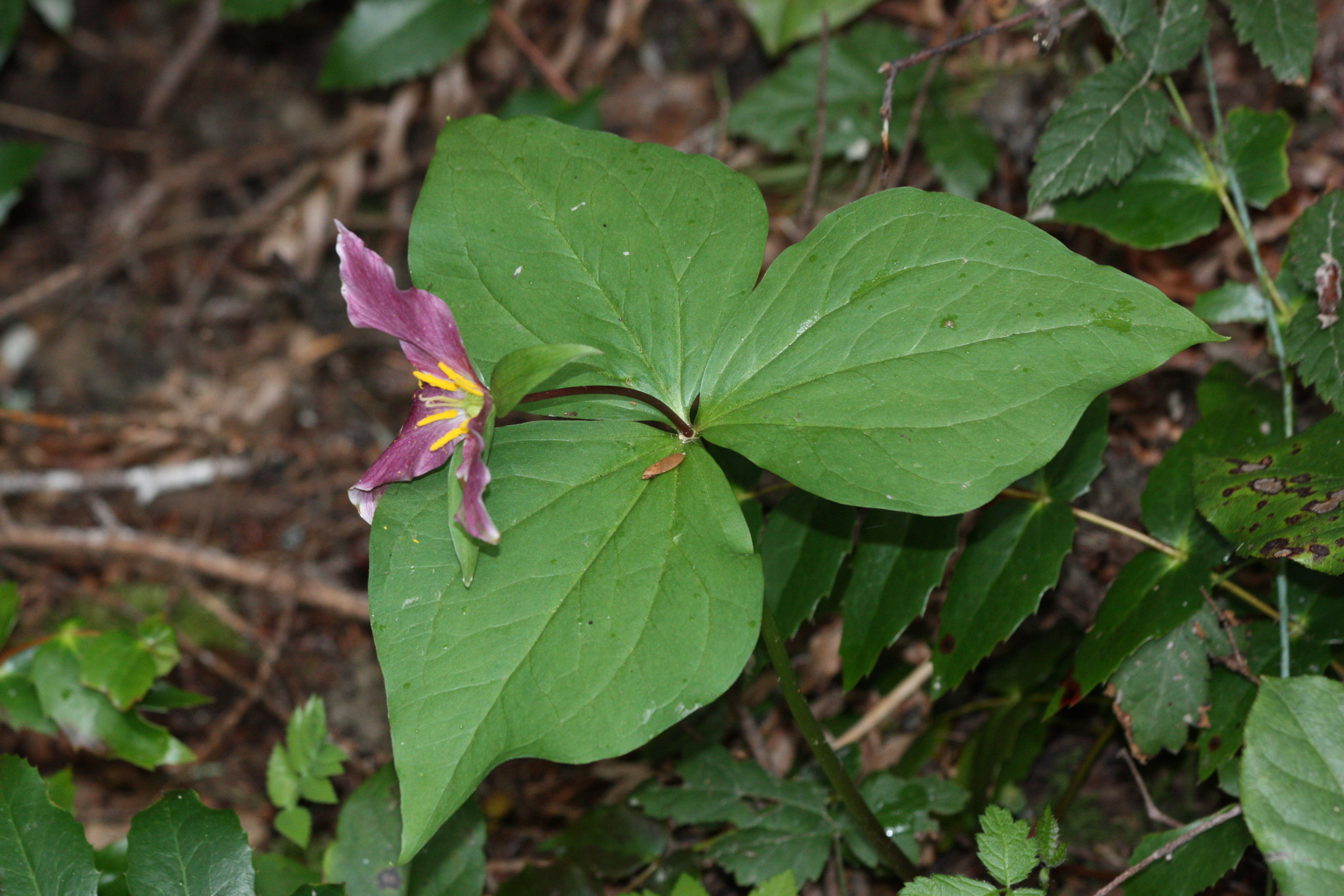
Another purple flower

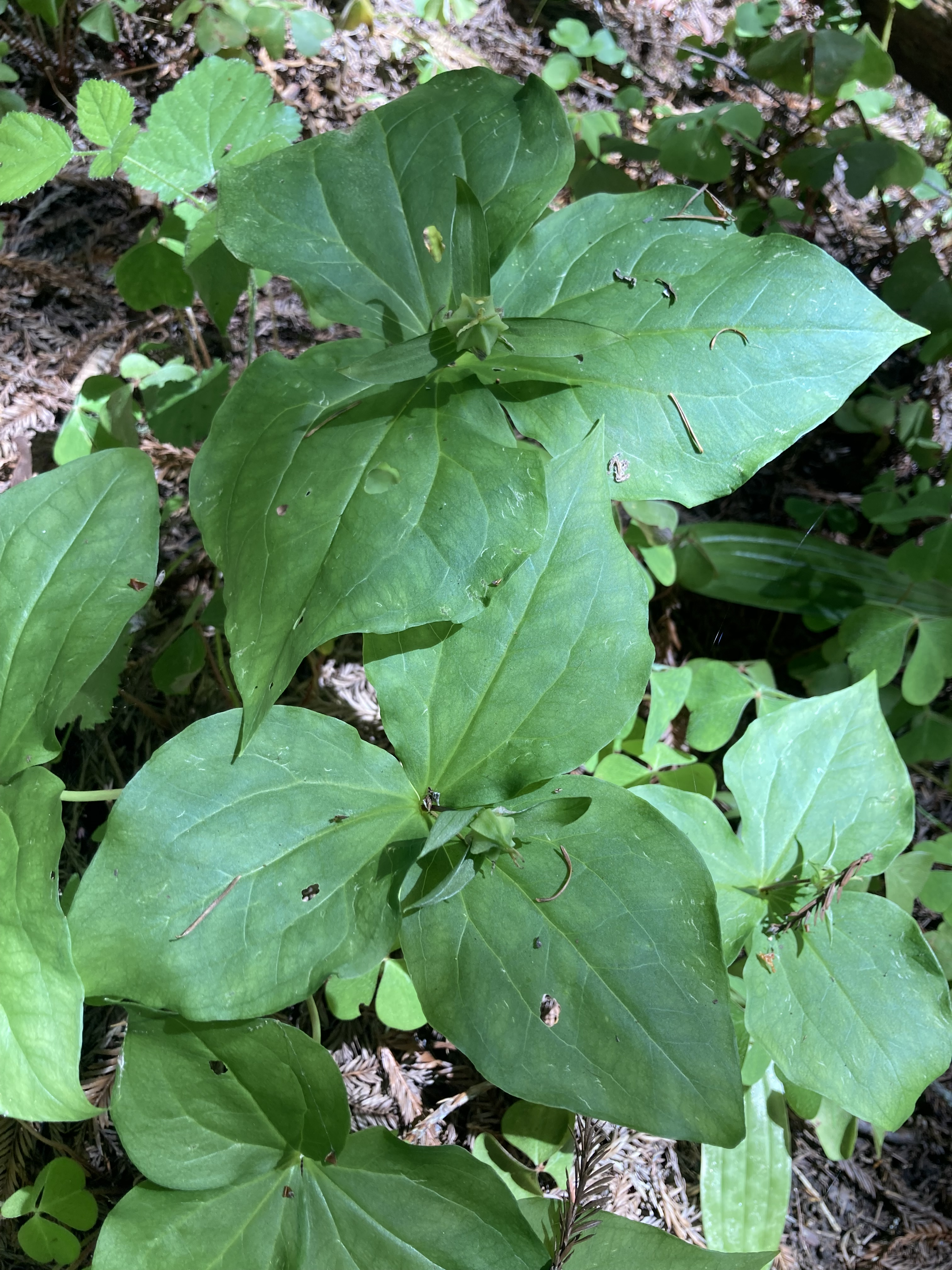
Trillium ovatum with immature fruit.

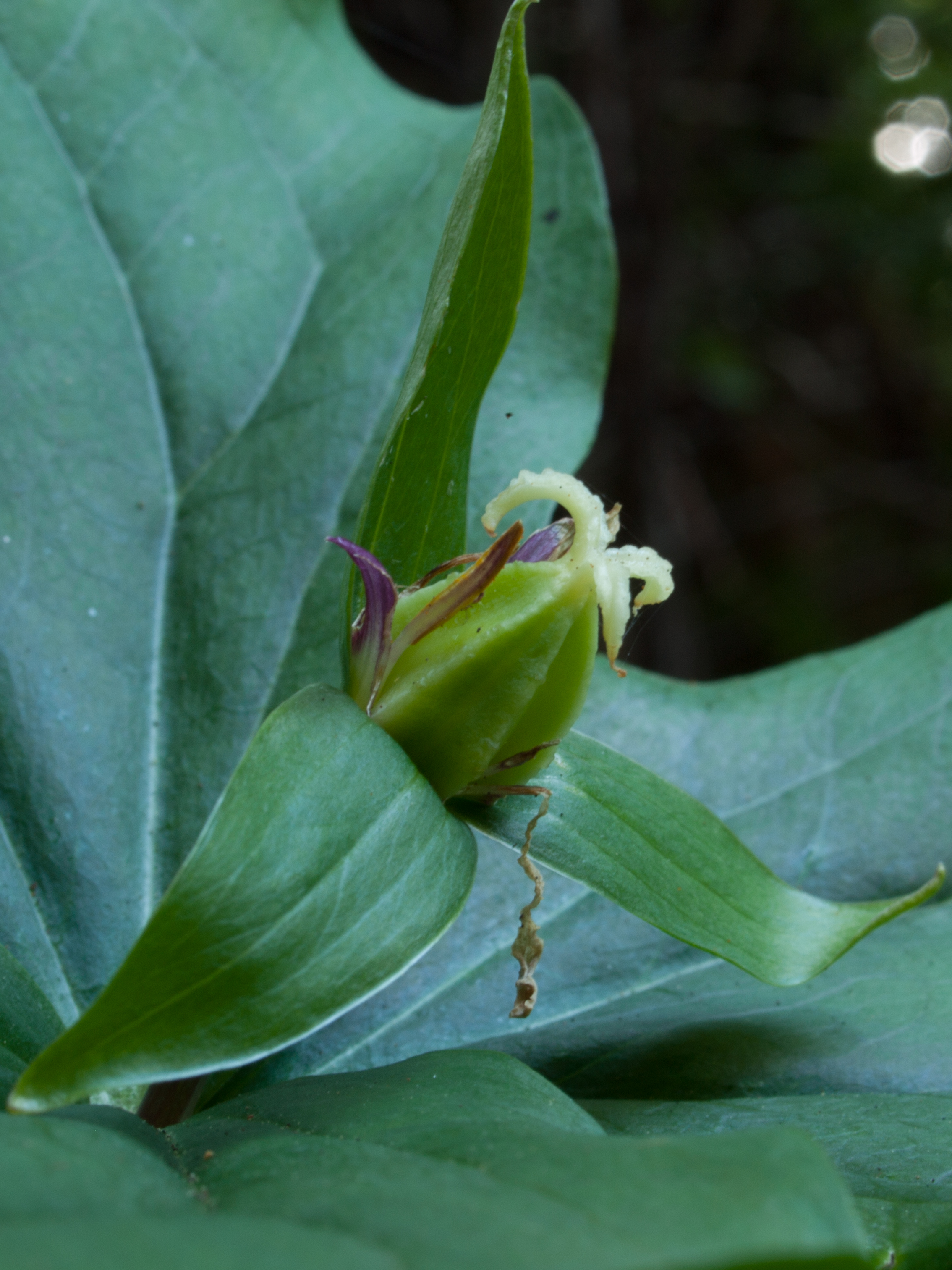
Detail of fruit

== Bibliography ==
- Case, Frederick W.; Case, Roberta B. (1997). Trilliums. Portland, Oregon: Timber Press. ISBN 978-0-88192-374-2.
- Gates, R.R. (February 1917). "A systematic study of the North American genus Trillium, its variability, and its relation to Paris and Medeola". Annals of the Missouri Botanical Garden. 4 (1): 43–92. Bibcode:1917AnMBG...4...43G. doi:10.2307/2990062. JSTOR 2990062.
- Lampley, Jayne A. (2021). A systematic and biogeographic study of Trillium (Melanthiaceae) (PhD). University of Tennessee.
- Meredith, Clayton; Frances, Anne; Highland, Amy; Oliver, Leah; Floden, Aaron; Gaddy, L.L.; Knapp, Wesley; Leaman, Danna; Leopold, Susan; Littlefield, Tara; Raguso, Robert; Schilling, Edward; Schotz, Alfred; Walker, Anna; Wayman, Kjirsten (2022). The Conservation Status of Trillium in North America. Hockessin, DE and Albuquerque, NM: Mt. Cuba Center, and New Mexico BioPark Society. ISBN 979-8-9850471-0-3.
- O'Neill, Darlene M. (1995). Taxonomic study of Trillium ovatum forma hibbersonii (MS). University of British Columbia.
- O'Neill, Darlene M.; Farmer, Susan B.; Floden, Aaron; Lampley, Jayne; Schilling, Edward E. (2020). "Trillium hibbersonii (Melanthiaceae), a phylogenetically distinct species from western North America". Phytotaxa. 436 (2): 193–195. Bibcode:2020Phytx.436..193O. doi:10.11646/phytotaxa.436.2.9.
- Pursh, Frederick (1814). Flora Americae Septentrionalis; or A systematic arrangement and description of the plants of North America. London. LCCN 05024608.
- Ream, Tarn (2011). Life History and Demography of Trillium ovatum Pursh. (Liliaceae) in Western Montana (MIS thesis). Missoula, MT: The University of Montana.
- Renner, Maralyn A. (June 1980). Studies in Trillium (Liliaceae): The pedicellate Trillium of the Pacific Northwest (MA thesis). Arcata, CA: Humboldt State University.
- Wayman, Kjirsten A.; Wright, Alexander J.; Renner, Maralyn; Floden, Aaron; Lampley, Jayne A.; Farmer, Susan B.; Schilling, Edward E. (6 March 2024). "New insights into systematics of the Trillium ovatum complex". Madroño. 70 (3): 158–171. doi:10.3120/0024-9637-70.3.158.
