= Wake-robin =

Wake-robin, wakerobin, or wake robin are used in the common names of several species of flowering plants, including:

- Arum maculatum, a wake-robin (not to be confused with Trillium erectum)
- Pseudotrillium rivale, the brook wakerobin
- Various species of Trillium, including:
  - Trillium albidum, the giant white wakerobin
  - Trillium angustipetalum, the narrowpetal wakerobin
  - Trillium catesbaei, the bashful wakerobin
  - Trillium cernuum, a nodding wakerobin (not to be confused with Trillium flexipes)
  - Trillium chloropetalum, the giant wakerobin
  - Trillium decipiens, the Chattahoochee River wakerobin
  - Trillium decumbens, the trailing wakerobin
  - Trillium discolor, the mottled wakerobin
  - Trillium erectum, a wake robin (not to be confused with Arum maculatum)
  - Trillium flexipes, a nodding wakerobin (not to be confused with Trillium cernuum)
  - Trillium foetidissimum, the Mississippi River wakerobin
  - Trillium gracile, the Sabine River wakerobin
  - Trillium grandiflorum, the white wake-robin
  - Trillium kurabayashii, the giant purple wakerobin
  - Trillium ludovicianum, the Louisiana wakerobin
  - Trillium luteum, the yellow wakerobin
  - Trillium maculatum, the spotted wakerobin
  - Trillium ovatum, the western wakerobin
  - Trillium persistens, the persistent wakerobin
  - Trillium pusillum, the dwarf wakerobin
  - Trillium recurvatum, the prairie wake-robin
  - Trillium reliquum, the Confederate wakerobin
  - Trillium rugelii, the illscented wakerobin
  - Trillium sessile, a sessile-flowered wake-robin (not to be confused with other sessile-flowered trilliums)
  - Trillium simile, the jeweled wakerobin
  - Trillium stamineum, the Blue Ridge wakerobin
  - Trillium sulcatum, the furrowed wakerobin
  - Trillium texanum, the Texas wakerobin
  - Trillium underwoodii, the longbract wakerobin
  - Trillium undulatum, the smiling wake robin, also known as the striped wake-robin
  - Trillium vaseyi, the sweet wakerobin
  - Trillium viride, the wood wakerobin
  - Trillium viridescens, the tapertip wakerobin
