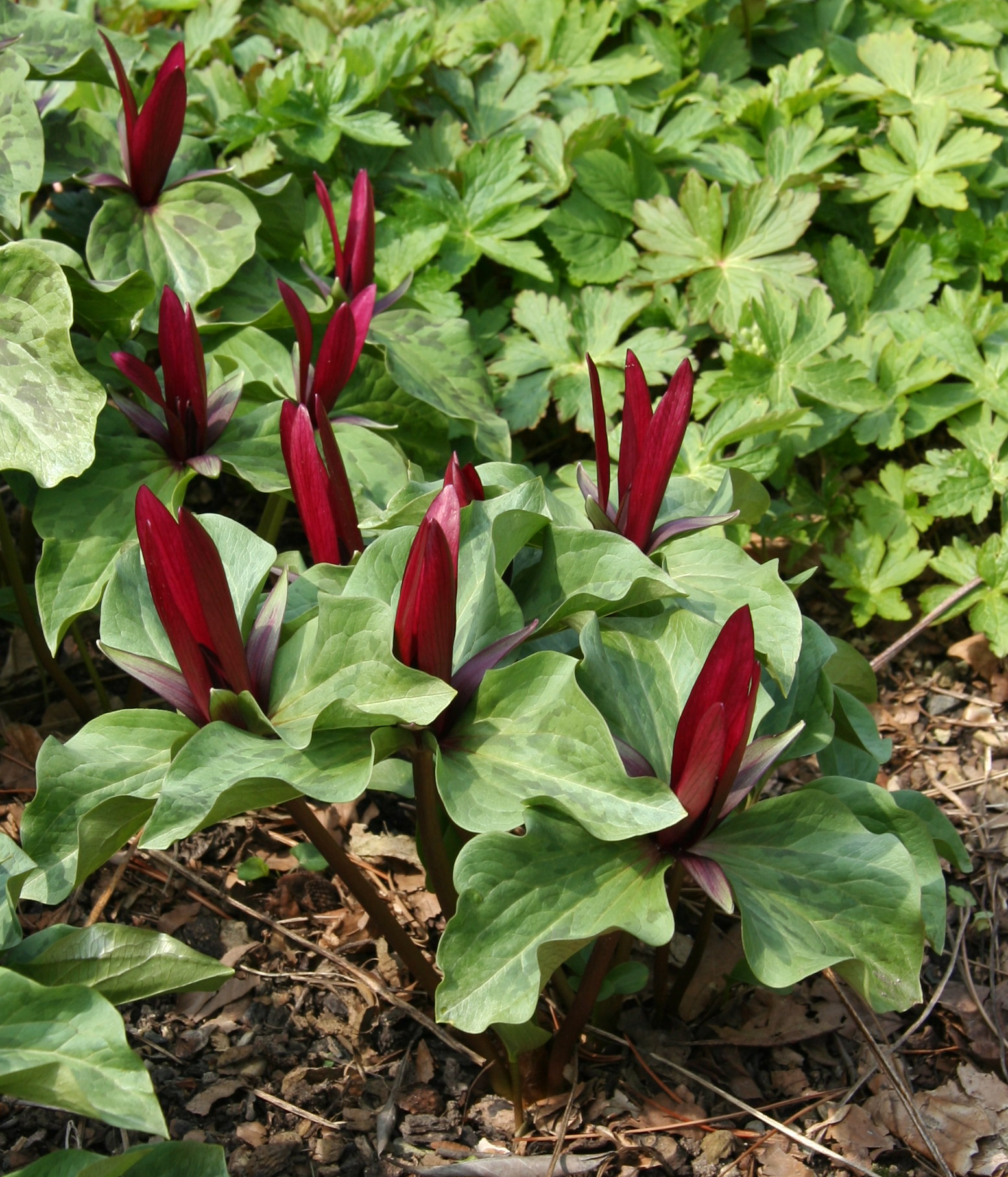
- Botanischen Garten; Dresden, Germany

Conservation status
- Vulnerable (NatureServe)

Scientific classification
- Kingdom: Plantae
- Clade: Tracheophytes
- Clade: Angiosperms
- Clade: Monocots
- Order: Liliales
- Family: Melanthiaceae
- Genus: Trillium
- Species: T. kurabayashii

Binomial name
- Trillium kurabayashii J.D.Freeman

Synonyms
- T. kurabayashii: Trillium kurabayashii f. luteum V.G.Soukup

= Trillium kurabayashii =

Species of flowering plant

Trillium kurabayashii is a species of flowering plant in the bunchflower family Melanthiaceae. The species is endemic to the western United States, occurring in extreme southwestern Oregon, northwestern California, and the Sierra Nevada of northern California. It was first described by John Daniel Freeman in 1975. The specific epithet kurabayashii honors Masataka Kurabayashi, a Japanese cytologist and population geneticist who first postulated the taxon’s existence. It is commonly known as the giant purple wakerobin, a reference to its conspicuously large, dark purple-red flower, one of the largest of any sessile-flowered trillium.

Unlike most other authorities, the influential Jepson Manual does not recognize Trillium kurabayashii as a distinct species. This discrepancy has led to widespread confusion regarding the identification and distribution of other purple-flowered trilliums native to California, namely Trillium angustipetalum and Trillium chloropetalum.

== Description ==
Trillium kurabayashii is a perennial herbaceous plant that persists by means of an underground rhizome. Like all trilliums, it has a whorl of three bracts (leaves) and a single trimerous flower with 3 sepals, 3 petals, two whorls of 3 stamens each, and 3 carpels fused into a single ovary with 3 stigmas. Since its flower has no stalk, it belongs to subgenus Sessilia, the sessile-flowered trilliums.

Scape erect, 28–44 cm (11–17 in) long, usually 2.3–2.5 times as long as the bracts. Bracts sessile, ovate or widely ovate, 11–18 cm (4.3–7.1 in) long, dark green, with tips generally slightly acuminate. Sepals lanceolate, 42–70 mm (1.7–2.8 in) long, diverging, greenish or basally purple. Petals oblanceolate, 65–105 mm (2.6–4.1 in) long, usually 3.3–4.6 times longer than wide, erect, dark purple (variously referred to as maroon-red, red-purple, purple-red, or lurid purple), underside usually duller than the top. Stamens erect, 16–25 mm (0.63–0.98 in) long; filaments short, dark purple; anther sacs introrse, 14–21 mm (0.55–0.83 in) long, with yellow pollen; connectives prolonged up to 0.5 mm. Carpels approximately 4/5 as tall or equal to the stamens; ovary ovoid, 9–13 mm (0.35–0.51 in) tall, dark purple, a rounded hexagon in cross section; stigmas coarsely subulate, 6–8 mm (0.24–0.31 in) long, erect, dark purple. Flowers have a spicy or musty odor at anthesis, sometimes becoming fetid with age. Fruit dark reddish purple, ovoid to ellipsoid, weakly angled, 20–50 mm (0.79–1.97 in), fleshy.

Trillium kurabayashii has one of the largest flowers of any sessile-flowered trillium. Petals up to 140 mm (5.5 in) long have been recorded.

=== Similar species ===
Trillium kurabayashii is often confused with other sessile-flowered trilliums in the western United States, partially due to morphological similarities but also because of long-standing disagreements regarding taxonomy. The following key was published by Freeman in 1975:

Identification Key Trillium subgenus Sessilia of the western United States
19. Bracts long-petioled, the petioles about one-third to one-half the total length; blades usually elliptic, sometimes nearly circular or reniform; scape reaching only to the soil surface or a few centimeters above	T. petiolatum
19. Bracts sessile or subsessile (short-attenuate); blades usually ovate; scape rising well above the soil surface, usually more than 2 decimeters	20
20. Stamens about twice the length of carpels; flowers with sweet rose-like fragrance	21
21. Anther connective tissue greenish; filaments usually green, sometimes purple; anther dehiscence lateral; gynoecium greenish (rarely with purple stigmas); petals white (rarely purple basally) to pink	T. albidum
21. Androecium and gynoecium purple throughout; anther dehiscence introrse; petals varying from purple to yellow or white	T. chloropetalum
22. Petals varying from bright greenish yellow to bronze or purple	T. c. var chloropetalum
22. Petals varying from white or pink to reddish or garnet-purple	T. c. var. giganteum
20. Stamens only slightly longer than carpels; flowers with musty or fetid odor	23
23. Petals linear, more than 7 (mostly ca. 9) times as long as wide, dark purple; bracts ovate, rounded or blunt, basally attenuate, often shiny underneath	T. angustipetalum
23. Petals oblanceolate, less than 6 (mostly ca. 4.5) times as long as wide, brownish or greenish (lurid) purple; bracts ovate, slightly acuminate, sessile, dull green underneath	T. kurabayashii

The ranges of Trillium kurabayashii and T. albidum overlap but their flowers are very different, so there is little chance of confusion when the plant in question is at flowering stage. On the other hand, the native ranges of T. kurabayashii and T. chloropetalum do not overlap, but in the absence of location data, the two species are often confused since both can (and usually do) have dark purple flowers. To distinguish the two species, the relative length of the stamens is diagnostic: the stamens of T. kurabayashii are about the same length as (or slightly longer than) the carpels, while the stamens of T. chloropetalum are almost twice the length of the carpels. Also, the scape of T. kurabayashii is 2.4–2.6 times as long as the bracts, while the scape of T. chloropetalum is 3.0–3.3 as long as the bracts. Finally, the odor emitted by the flower of T. kurabayashii is spicy and may become fetid with age, whereas the flower odor of T. chloropetalum is pleasantly rose-like.

Trillium kurabayashii is distinguished from T. angustipetalum by leaf shape and flower dimensions. The leaves of T. kurabayashii are sessile, usually with acuminate tips, while the leaves of T. angustipetalum have a narrow petiole-like base and tips that are rounded or blunt. On average, the sepals of T. kurabayashii are longer and wider than those of T. angustipetalum. Since the petals of T. angustipetalum are much narrower, the relative dimensions of the petals are dramatically different in each species. The petals of T. kurabayashii and T. angustipetalum have an average length/width ratio of (2.7–) 4.5 (–5.8) and (6.5–) 9.0 (–11.0), respectively.

== Taxonomy ==
Trillium kurabayashii was one of five new species of sessile-flowered trilliums described by John Daniel Freeman in 1975 (the others being T. albidum, T. decipiens, T. foetidissimum, and T. reliquum). The specific epithet kurabayashii honors Masataka Kurabayashi, a Japanese cytologist and population geneticist whose work first suggested the presence of an unrecognized species of sessile-flowered trillium on the West Coast of the United States.

Trillium kurabayashii f. luteum V.G.Soukup is a synonym for Trillium kurabayashii J.D.Freeman. This form has yellow or greenish-yellow flowers with little or no purple pigments. It is distinct from the yellow form of Trillium chloropetalum, a taxon whose native range does not overlap with Trillium kurabayashii.

Some authorities, including The Jepson Manual, consider Trillium kurabayashii J.D.Freeman to be a synonym for Trillium angustipetalum (Torr.) J.D.Freeman. Most other authorities, including the USDA PLANTS Database, Flora of North America and Plants of the World Online, accept Trillium kurabayashii as a distinct species. This disagreement has led to widespread confusion regarding the identification and distribution of other purple-flowered trilliums native to California.

== Distribution and habitat ==
There are two small disjunct populations of Trillium kurabayashii in the western United States. One population extends along the western slope of the Klamath Mountains from Curry County in extreme southwestern Oregon to Humboldt County in northwestern California. (The type specimen was found at the edge of a logged redwood forest in the town of Klamath in Del Norte County, California.) The other population occurs in the western foothills of the Sierra Nevada, in Placer, Nevada, Yuba, and Butte counties in northern California. Outside of its native range, citizen scientists have observed T. kurabayashii in a handful of counties in California and Oregon.

The native range of Trillium kurabayashii overlaps with that of T. angustipetalum and T. albidum. T. kurabayashii is found along streams at the edges of coastal redwood forests; in rich, moist conifer-hardwood forests; and at the higher elevations, both in forests and in open grassy meadows with scattered oak trees. It grows at elevations of 30–150 m (98–492 ft) along the coast and 300–1,000 m (980–3,280 ft) in the Sierra Nevada.

== Ecology ==
On the West Coast, Trillium kurabayashii flowers from late March to mid-April. Flowering is somewhat later in the Sierra Nevada, from early April to early May. It is winter-hardy in central Michigan gardens, but it emerges so early that it gets damaged by frosts and therefore never thrives in that region.

== Uses ==
A garden plant known in the nursery trade as Trillium sessile var. rubrum was widely bought and sold in the 1950s and 60s. It had sessile flowers with large, dark red, erect petals over strongly mottled, sessile leaves. The availability of this plant was largely due to the efforts of a man named Gilman Keasey of Corvallis, Oregon who grew the plants from seed in great quantities. By 1968 his annual crop of flowering size plants had reached about 15,000. Keasey collected his original three plants in northwestern California in 1947, suggesting that the species was in fact Trillium kurabayashii, the only species of sessile-flowered trillium now known to occur in that region.

== Bibliography ==
- Case, Frederick W. Jr. [in Spanish]; Case, Roberta B. (1997). Trilliums. Portland, Oregon: Timber Press. pp. 204–208. ISBN 978-0-88192-374-2.
- Freeman, J. D. (1975). "Revision of Trillium subgenus Phyllantherum (Liliaceae)". Brittonia. 27 (1): 1–62. Bibcode:1975Britt..27....1F. doi:10.2307/2805646. JSTOR 2805646. S2CID 20824379.
