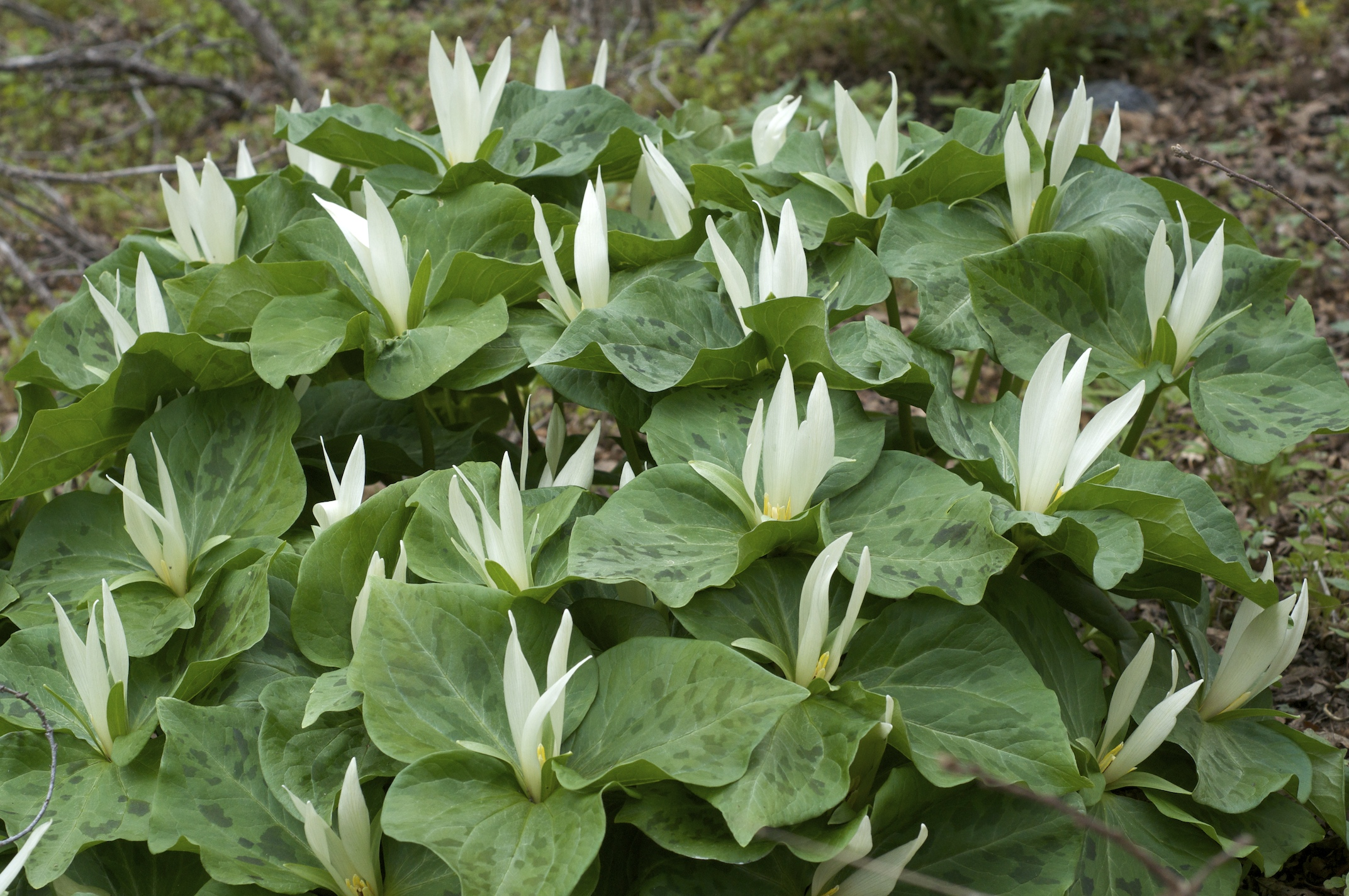
- Mendocino County, California

Conservation status
- Apparently Secure (NatureServe)

- Least Concern (IUCN 3.1)

Scientific classification
- Kingdom: Plantae
- Clade: Embryophytes
- Clade: Tracheophytes
- Clade: Angiosperms
- Clade: Monocots
- Order: Liliales
- Family: Melanthiaceae
- Genus: Trillium
- Species: T. albidum

Binomial name
- Trillium albidum J.D.Freeman

Synonyms
- T. albidum subsp. parviflorum: Trillium parviflorum V.G.Soukup

= Trillium albidum =

Species of flowering plant

Trillium albidum is a species of flowering plant in the bunchflower family Melanthiaceae. It is the only trillium characterized by a stalkless white flower. The species is endemic to the western United States, ranging from central California through Oregon to southwestern Washington. In the San Francisco Bay Area, it is often confused with a white-flowered form of Trillium chloropetalum. In northern Oregon and southwestern Washington, it has a smaller, less conspicuous flower.

Trillium albidum was first described by John Daniel Freeman in 1975. The specific epithet albidum means "white", a reference to the uniformly white flower color of this distinctive species. It is commonly known as the giant white wakerobin or white toadshade.

== Description ==
Trillium albidum is a perennial herbaceous plant that persists by means of underground rhizomes. There are three large leaf-like bracts arranged in a whorl about a scape that rises directly from the rhizome, growing to 22 to 58 cm (8.5 to 23 in) in height. The bracts are sessile and broadly ovate, each 10 to 20 cm (4 to 8 in) long and 12 to 15 cm (4.5 to 6 in) wide. The bracts are green and weakly mottled with brown or dark green spots (which often fade later in the season).

Each stem produces one flower, which is held on top of the bracts. The fragrant flower has three lance-shaped green sepals and three wider white (sometimes pink or purple-tinged) petals measuring 4.8 to 8 cm (2 to 3 in) long and 2.2 to 3 cm (1 to 1 in) wide (although there is a conspicuously small-flowered subspecies as noted in the previous section).

Trillium albidum subsp. albidum and T. albidum subsp. parviflorum are distinguished on the basis of multiple characters:

	Trillium albidum subsp. albidum			Trillium albidum subsp. parviflorum
Distribution	South of Corvallis, Oregon			North of the Columbia River
Stem count	Often several from the same rhizome; large clumps are common		⇨	One (rarely more)
Stem length	Longer: 22 to 58 cm (8.7 to 22.8 in) long	⇦		Shorter: 17 to 30 cm (6.7 to 11.8 in) long
Leaf mottling	Immaculate to lightly mottled		⇨	Lightly to heavily mottled, less commonly immaculate
Leaf size	Larger: 10 to 20 cm (3.9 to 7.9 in) long and 12 to 15 cm (4.7 to 5.9 in) wide	⇦		Smaller: 6.5 to 16 cm (2.6 to 6.3 in) long and 5 to 8 cm (2.0 to 3.1 in) wide
Sepals (fruiting stage)	Erect with tips touching or crossed over fruit	⇦		Cupped at fruit base before flaring widely outward
Petal size	Longer and wider: 4.8 to 8 cm (1.9 to 3.1 in) long and 2.2 to 3 cm (0.9 to 1.2 in) wide	⇦		Shorter and narrower: 2.2 to 4.5 cm (0.9 to 1.8 in) long (rarely longer) and 0.4 to 1 cm (0.2 to 0.4 in) wide
Petal shape	Widest near the middle, narrowing about equally in both directions	⇦		Narrow, appearing almost straight-sided
Petal attachment	Constricted strongly at the base		⇨	No noticeable constriction at the base
Fruit color	Green or purplish green		⇨	Dark reddish purple or maroon
Fruit surface	Dull	⇦		Glossy to shiny
Fruit shape	Triangular; more or less prominently ridged top to bottom resulting in a series of planes; taller than wide	⇦		Round; ridging (if any) confined to the top of the fruit; no indication of planes; wider than tall
Scent	Strongly rose (funereal)	⇦	⇨	Lightly bitter or spicy-rank, clove-like

In the region between Corvallis, Oregon and the Columbia River, the species is variable and difficult to identify to subspecies level. The directional arrows in the table above point toward the subspecies that dominates with respect to that character.

Trillium albidum is the only sessile-flowered Trillium species characterized by white flowers. Throughout most of its range, this characteristic is sufficient to identify the species, but in the San Francisco Bay Area where both T. albidum and a white-flowered variety of T. chloropetalum occur, the two species are distinguished by their reproductive organs. The latter has dark purple stamens and carpels while those of T. albidum are almost invariably white or pale green, with occasional purple stain.

This plant has gained the Royal Horticultural Society's Award of Garden Merit.

== Taxonomy ==
Trillium albidum was one of five new species described by John Daniel Freeman in 1975 (the others being T. decipiens, T. foetidissimum, T. kurabayashii, and T. reliquum). The specific epithet albidum, which means "white", refers to its uniformly white flower. Despite being one of the most distinctive species in subgenus Sessilia, the taxon was treated under the misapplied epithet chloropetalum for almost 75 years. To alleviate the confusion, Freeman gave a completely new treatment of Trillium chloropetalum (Torr.) Howell that dissociated the latter from T. albidum.

The following infraspecific names are accepted by most naming authorities:

- Trillium albidum subsp. albidum
- Trillium albidum subsp. parviflorum (V.G.Soukup) K.L.Chambers & S.C.Meyers

The two subspecies are distinguished by overall size as well as the size and shape of the flower petals. In subsp. parviflorum, the scape is just half the length of the typical subspecies while the petals are consistently shorter and narrower.

In 2002, Case described two distinct but related Trillium species, T. albidum J.D.Freeman and T. parviflorum V.G.Soukup. Some naming authorities still consider both of these species names to be valid while other authorities consider the latter name to be a synonym for T. albidum subsp. parviflorum, in which case the two species originally described by Case become a single species. In any case, there is evidence that T. albidum and T. albidum subsp. parviflorum are less closely related to each other than the latter is to T. luteum, a sessile trillium species native to eastern North America.

== Distribution and habitat ==
Trillium albidum has the widest range of any sessile-flowered trillium in western North America, from central California through Oregon to southwestern Washington. In northern California, its range extends eastward from the Pacific coast through the Klamath Mountains into the Sierra Nevada. The type specimen was collected in Josephine County in southern Oregon. The southern edge of its range overlaps with that of T. chloropetalum in the San Francisco Bay Area. The intermediate populations found in this region may be due to hybridization of the two species.

The typical subspecies Trillium albidum subsp. albidum ranges from northern California to central Oregon while T. albidum subsp. parviflorum is found in northwestern Oregon and southwestern Washington. In the region where the two subspecies overlap, from the Umpqua River north to the Columbia River, there are populations of considerable variation, which complicates identification at the subspecies level based on morphological characters alone. In southwestern Oregon, just north of the California line, there is a population of plants with flowers that are pale yellow or creamy (not white) with no purple pigments whatsoever. Since these plants grow at the higher elevations, flowering is delayed to May or early June. Evidently this taxon has not been named.

Trillium albidum is found in diverse habitats, on the moist slopes of mixed deciduous-coniferous forests, among shrubs and thickets, and along stream banks and river beds.

== Ecology ==
Flowering typically occurs in the spring, from mid March to early May. In California, flowers bloom between February and June.

Like other Trillium species, T. albidum has a one-leaf vegetative stage followed by a three-leaf vegetative (juvenile) stage. After several years of vegetative growth, the plant finally reaches its three-leaf reproductive (flowering) stage. It has an indefinite life span of many years.

== Conservation ==
The global conservation status of Trillium albidum is apparently secure (G4). However, Trillium albidum subsp. parviflorum is globally imperiled (T2).

== Bibliography ==
- Case, Frederick W.; Case, Roberta B. (1997). Trilliums. Portland, Oregon: Timber Press. ISBN 978-0-88192-374-2.
- Freeman, J. D. (1975). "Revision of Trillium subgenus Phyllantherum (Liliaceae)". Brittonia. 27 (1): 1–62. Bibcode:1975Britt..27....1F. doi:10.2307/2805646. JSTOR 2805646. S2CID 20824379.
