= Helen Webb Harris =

- Born: August 15, 1899; Washington, D.C., U.S.
- Died: August 11, 1985 (aged 85); Washington, D.C., U.S.
- Occupations: Educator, golfer, sports administrator, playwright

Helen Webb Harris (August 15, 1899 – August 11, 1985) was an American educator, playwright, and golfer. She founded the Wake-Robin Golf Club in 1937. It is the United States' oldest registered African-American women's golf club. In 1947, she became the first woman to serve as president of the Eastern Golf Association.

== Early life and education ==
Harris was born in Washington, D.C., the daughter of Elias Samuel Webb and Mittie Margaret Ingram Webb. She attended M Street High School and Miner Teachers College, before she earned a bachelor's degree at Howard University in 1923, and a master's degree in drama at Catholic University of America. She was a member of Delta Sigma Theta.

== Career ==
=== Teaching and writing ===
Harris was an educator in the Washington, D.C. school system from 1915 to 1955, most of that time teaching English and history at Banneker Senior High School. Harris wrote two historical plays, Frederick Douglass and Genifrede, the Daughter of Toussaint L'Ouverture, which were produced at Howard University.

=== The Wake-Robin Golf Club ===
Harris and her husband were both active golfers. The first meeting of the Wake-Robin Golf Club was held in 1937, at Harris's house, with thirteen women, most of whom were married to members of the Royal Golf Club. The club was named after the wake-robin wildflower. Harris was the club's first president, and under her leadership the club joined the United Golf Association and the Eastern Golf Association. In 1938 the club drafted and sent a petition to Secretary of the Interior Harold L. Ickes seeking to desegregate the public courses of the District of Columbia. In response Ickes approved the construction of a nine-hole golf course on the site of an abandoned trash dump, called Langston Golf Course, which opened in 1939.

The Wake-Robin Golf Club and the Royal Golf Club continued to pressure Secretary Ickes, and he issued an order in 1941 to open public courses to all. In 1947 Harris was elected as the first female president of the Eastern Golf Association, a position which she held for two terms. As president, she met boxer Joe Louis, who was an active amateur golfer. The Wake-Robin Golf Club was part of the movement to force the Professional Golfers Association to drop its "White-only" rule for eligibility, which it did in 1961.

=== Publications ===
- "Genifrede, the Daughter of Toussaint L'Ouverture" (1935, drama)
- "Martin Robison Delany" (1941, article)
- "Calling All Golfers" (1947, newspaper article)
- "Nation's Golfers Preparing for 1947 National Tourney" (1947, newspaper article)
- "Frederick Douglass" (1952, drama)

=== Recognition ===
In 1973 Harris was inducted into the National Afro‐American Golfers Hall of Fame.

== Personal life and legacy ==
Webb married Albert R. Harris, a dentist. They had a daughter, Helen, who was also a teacher. She became a member of the Bahà'í faith in 1952, and was secretary of the Washington Bahà'í organization for several years. Her husband died in 1967, and Harris died in 1985, in Washington, D.C. The Helen Webb Harris Scholarship Fund was established in 2007, by the Wake-Robin Golf Club, to support outstanding high school seniors who will play women's golf at the college level. Some of the Wake-Robin Golf Club's records are held at Howard University.
