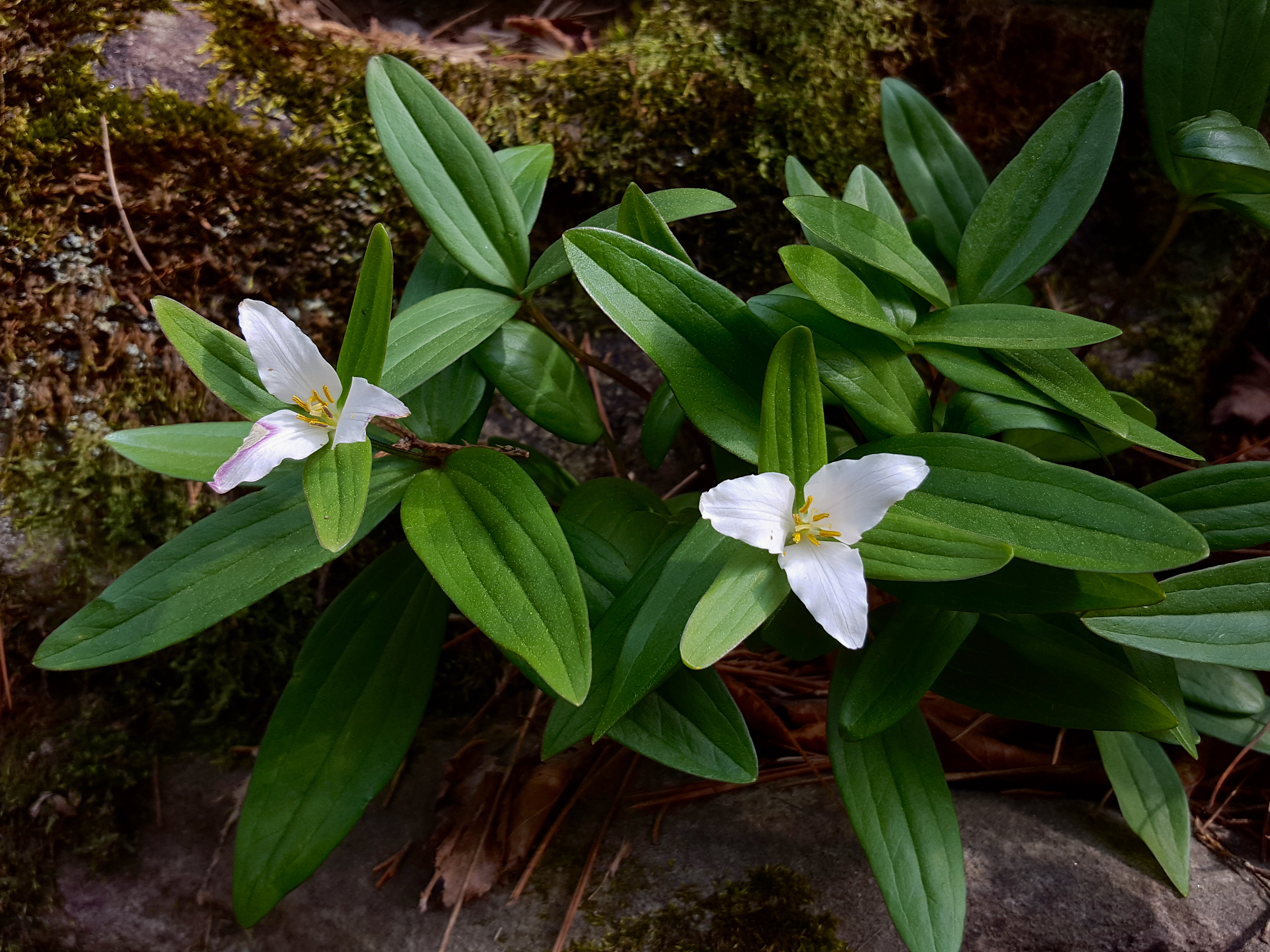
- Trillium pusillum, Carroll County, Arkansas

Conservation status
- Least Concern (IUCN 3.1)

- Apparently Secure (NatureServe)

Scientific classification
- Kingdom: Plantae
- Clade: Tracheophytes
- Clade: Angiosperms
- Clade: Monocots
- Order: Liliales
- Family: Melanthiaceae
- Genus: Trillium
- Species: T. pusillum

Binomial name
- Trillium pusillum Michx.

Synonyms
- T. pusillum var. pusillum: Trillium angustifolium Raf.; Trillium ozarkanum E.J.Palmer & Steyerm.; Trillium pumilum Pursh; Trillium pusillum var. ozarkanum (E.J.Palmer & Steyerm.) Steyerm.; Trillium pusillum var. texanum (Buckley) Reveal & C.R.Broome; Trillium texanum Buckley; T. pusillum var. virginianum: Trillium pusillum var. monticulum Bodkin & Reveal; Trillium virginianum (Fernald) C.F.Reed

= Trillium pusillum =

Species of flowering plant

Trillium pusillum is a species of flowering plant in the family Melanthiaceae known by the common names dwarf trillium, least trillium and dwarf wakerobin. It is native to the southeastern and south-central United States from Oklahoma to Maryland.

== Description ==
Trillium pusillum is a perennial herbaceous plant with a thin, branching, horizontal rhizome. It produces one or two slender scapes up to 20 centimetres (7.9 in) tall. They increase in size after flowering. The three bracts are dark green, sometimes with a red tinge when new. The flower has three green to red-tinged sepals up to 3 centimetres (1.2 in) long and three wavy-edged petals that open white but quickly age pink. The six stamens are tipped with lavender or yellow anthers each up to a centimeter long. The stigmas have long, narrow, spreading lobes. The pulpy fruit is 1–1.5 centimetres (0.4–0.6 in) long.

== Ecology ==
Trillium pusillum flowers from March to early May. It can be found in several habitat types, including savannas, swamps, bogs, forests and woods, and fields. It grows on acidic soils. In Missouri, it is commonly pollinated by the western honey bee (Apis mellifera), and the seeds are dispersed by ants and harvestmen.

== Taxonomy ==
In addition to Trillium pusillum Michx., the following names are widely accepted:

- Trillium pusillum var. pusillum
- Trillium pusillum var. virginianum Fernald

The flowers of var. virginianum are usually slightly smaller than those of var. pusillum. Also, the flower of var. pusillum sits on a pedicel 0.5 to 2 cm (0.20 to 0.79 in) in length whereas the flower of var. virginianum is sessile or subsessile. If a pedicel is present in the latter variety, it is less than 0.3 cm (0.12 in) in length.

Many other names are in use, including:

- Trillium pusillum var. ozarkanum (E.J.Palmer & Steyerm.) Steyerm.
- Trillium pusillum var. texanum (Buckley) Reveal & C.R.Broome

The name Trillium texanum Buckley, used interchangeably with Trillium pusillum var. texanum, is regarded by some as a synonym for Trillium pusillum var. pusillum.

== Bibliography ==
- Case, Frederick W.; Case, Roberta B. (1997). Trilliums. Portland, Oregon: Timber Press. ISBN 978-0-88192-374-2.
- Farmer, Susan B. (2007). A Systematic Study of Trillium subgenus Delostylis (PhD). University of Tennessee.
