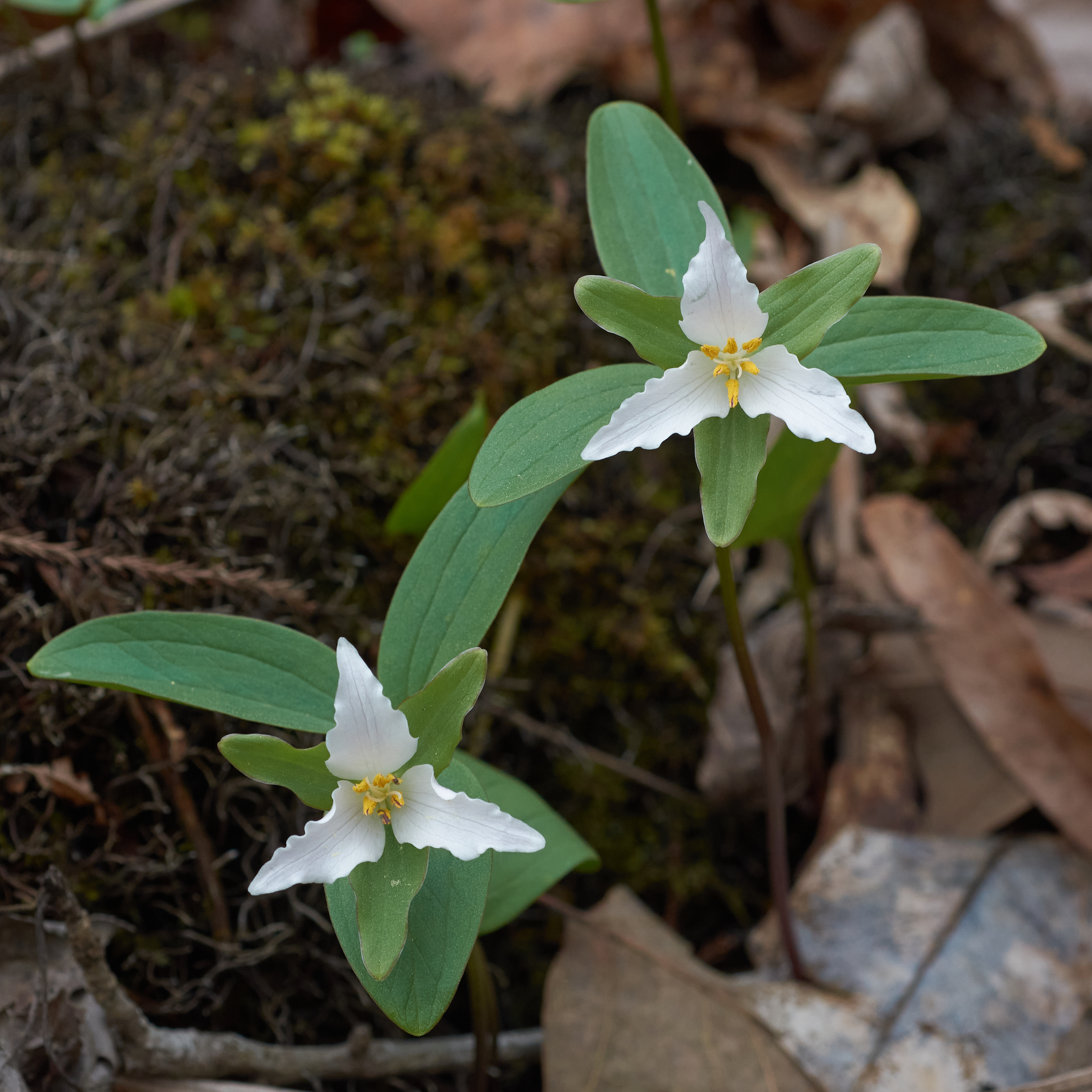
- Miller County, Arkansas (21 March)

Conservation status
- Vulnerable (NatureServe)

- Vulnerable (IUCN 3.1)

Scientific classification
- Kingdom: Plantae
- Clade: Tracheophytes
- Clade: Angiosperms
- Clade: Monocots
- Order: Liliales
- Family: Melanthiaceae
- Genus: Trillium
- Species: T. texanum

Binomial name
- Trillium texanum Buckley

Synonyms
- Synonymy: Trillium pusillum var. texanum (Buckley) Reveal & C.R.Broome

= Trillium texanum =

Species of flowering plant

Trillium texanum, the Texas trillium or Texas wakerobin, is a species of flowering plant in the family Melanthiaceae. It is found in east Texas, extreme southwestern Arkansas, and extreme northwestern Louisiana. Due to its limited range, it is designated as a vulnerable species.

== Description ==
Trillium texanum is a perennial herbaceous plant that flowers from March to early mid-April, with white flower petals.

== Taxonomy ==
Trillium texanum was first described by Samuel Botsford Buckley in 1861. Its type specimen was collected in Panola County, Texas, but that specimen is now lost. The specific epithet texanum refers to the U.S. state of Texas, its primary location.

As of April 2023, the name Trillium texanum Buckley is widely recognized, but a few authorities regard it as a variety of Trillium pusillum, either T. pusillum var. texanum or T. pusillum var. pusillum. The taxon is a member of the Catesbaei group (Trillium subgen. Delostylis), a group of pedicellate-flowered trilliums that includes Trillium catesbaei.

== Distribution and habitat ==
Trillium texanum is found primarily in east Texas, hence the common name Texas trillium. It also occurs in extreme southwestern Arkansas and extreme northwestern Louisiana. It typically grows in forested wetland habitat.

== Conservation ==
As of April 2023, the global conservation status of Trillium texanum is listed as vulnerable by both NatureServe and IUCN. It is critically imperiled in both Arkansas and Louisiana. It is under review by the U.S. Fish & Wildlife Service.

== Bibliography ==
- Middleton, Beth; Williams, Casey R.; Doffitt, Chris; Johnson, Darren (2022). "Effects of shading on the rare plant species, Physostegia correllii (Lamiaceae) and Trillium texanum (Melanthiaceae)". Journal of the Botanical Research Institute of Texas. 16 (2): 591–603. Bibcode:2022JBRIT..16..591M. doi:10.17348/jbrit.v16.i2.1270.
- Strong, Anna; Williamson, Paula (28 August 2015). "Data synthesis and species assessments to aid in determining future candidate or listed status for plants from the USFWS lawsuit settlements" (PDF). Texas Parks & Wildlife.
