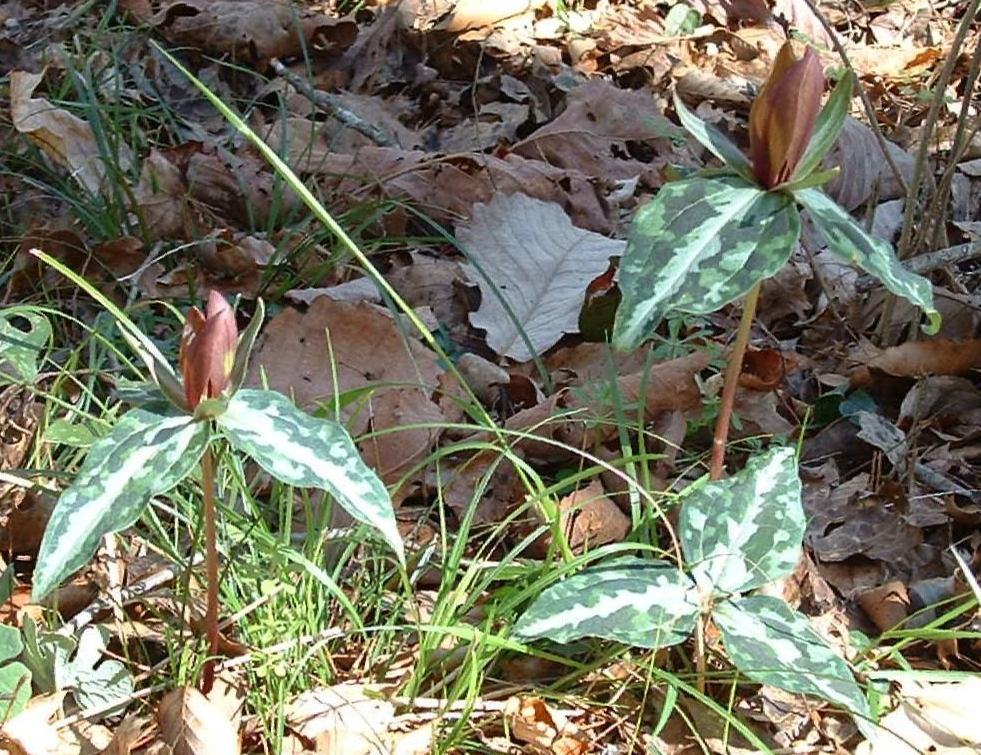
- Jackson County, Florida

Conservation status
- Vulnerable (NatureServe)

Scientific classification
- Kingdom: Plantae
- Clade: Tracheophytes
- Clade: Angiosperms
- Clade: Monocots
- Order: Liliales
- Family: Melanthiaceae
- Genus: Trillium
- Species: T. decipiens

Binomial name
- Trillium decipiens J.D.Freeman

= Trillium decipiens =

Species of flowering plant

Trillium decipiens, also known as Chattahoochee River wakerobin or deceiving trillium, is a spring-flowering perennial plant. It occurs mostly near the Chattahoochee River in Alabama, Florida and Georgia. Scattered populations are found elsewhere in these three states, all within the Atlantic Coastal Plain or Gulf Coastal Plain. Rich deciduous woods of bluffs, ravines, and alluvial land provide its most favored habitat.

== Description ==
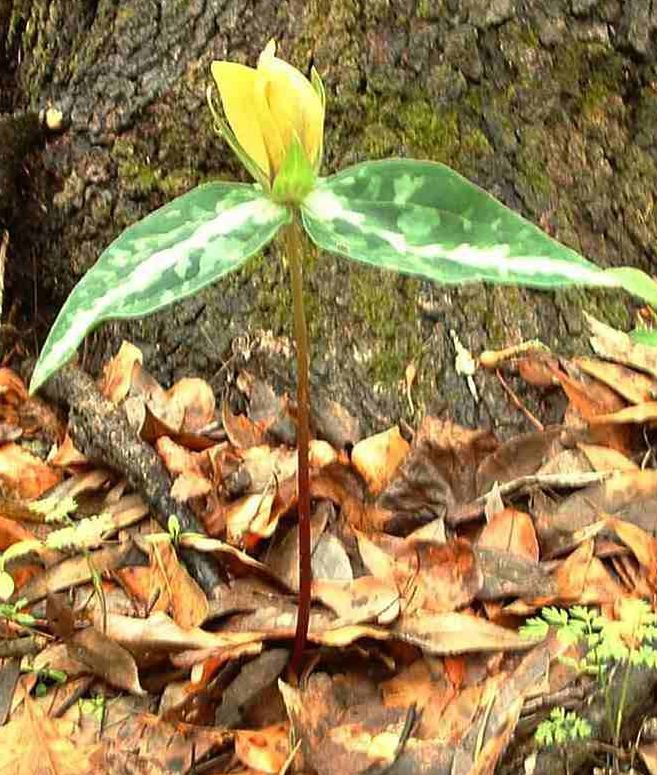
Yellow variant of Trillium decipiens (Jackson County, Florida)

Trillium decipiens is a sessile-flowered trillium, that is, it has no flower stalk. The flower has three purple, brown, or green (rarely yellow) petals that stand upright at the junction of the three strikingly mottled leaves. It is one of the earliest trilliums, often starting to bloom in January or February.

Trillium decipiens is often confused with Trillium underwoodii but the two species are easily distinguished by plant height. In the case of T. underwoodii, the stem is 1–1.5 times longer than the leaves at flowering, whereas with T. decipiens, the stem is 2.5–3 times longer than the leaves.

== Taxonomy ==
Trillium decipiens was first described by John Daniel Freeman in 1975. Phylogenetic analysis has since shown a lack of separation between T. decipiens and T. underwoodii, indicating the need to re-evaluate their status as distinct species.

== Bibliography ==
- Case, Frederick W. [in Spanish]; Case, Roberta B. (1997). Trilliums. Portland, Oregon: Timber Press. ISBN 978-0-88192-374-2.
- Freeman, J. D. (1975). "Revision of Trillium subgenus Phyllantherum (Liliaceae)". Brittonia. 27 (1): 1–62. Bibcode:1975Britt..27....1F. doi:10.2307/2805646. JSTOR 2805646. S2CID 20824379.
