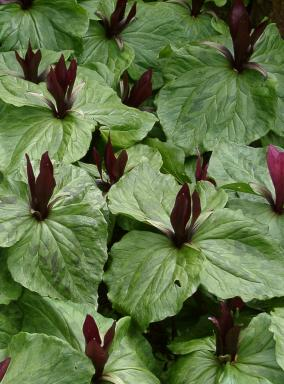

Conservation status
- Apparently Secure (NatureServe)

Scientific classification
- Kingdom: Plantae
- Clade: Tracheophytes
- Clade: Angiosperms
- Clade: Monocots
- Order: Liliales
- Family: Melanthiaceae
- Genus: Trillium
- Species: T. chloropetalum

Binomial name
- Trillium chloropetalum (Torr.) Howell

Synonyms
- T. chloropetalum: Trillium giganteum var. chloropetalum (Torr.) R.R.Gates; Trillium sessile var. chloropetalum Torr.; T. c. var. giganteum: Trillium chloropetalum subsp. giganteum (Hook. & Arn.) A.E.Murray; Trillium giganteum (Hook. & Arn.) A.Heller; Trillium sessile var. californicum S.Watson; Trillium sessile subsp. giganteum (Hook. & Arn.) A.E.Murray; Trillium sessile var. giganteum Hook. & Arn.

= Trillium chloropetalum =

Species of flowering plant

Trillium chloropetalum, also known as giant trillium, giant wakerobin, or common trillium, is a species of flowering plant in the family Melanthiaceae. It is endemic to the western U.S. state of California, being especially frequent in and around the San Francisco Bay Area.

== Description ==
Trillium chloropetalum is a perennial, clump-forming herbaceous plant with a thick underground rhizome. Like all trilliums, it has a whorl of three bracts (leaves) and a single trimerous flower with 3 sepals, 3 petals, two whorls of 3 stamens each, and 3 carpels fused into a single ovary with 3 stigmas. Since its flower has no stalk, T. chloropetalum belongs to subgenus Sessilia, the sessile-flowered trilliums. It is one of the largest of all Trillium species, with a scape (stem) from 20 to 70 cm (7.9 to 27.6 in) long. The bracts are broadly ovate, 7 to 21 cm (2.8 to 8.3 in) long and 7 to 18 cm (2.8 to 7.1 in) wide, usually with brownish mottling but sometimes unmottled. Petal color is highly variable, typically ranging from pale greenish yellow to greenish bronze (or purplish green) to dark purple. A variety that lacks yellow pigments has petal colors ranging from white to reddish-purple. The flower petals enclose purple stamens, 15 to 30 mm (0.59 to 1.18 in) long, and a purple ovary. Flowering occurs from late February to early April.

In the San Francisco Bay Area, a white-petaled form of T. chloropetalum is often confused with T. albidum, which also has white petals. The former is distinguished by the purple pigment in its anther connective tissue, a character lacking in T. albidum.

== Taxonomy ==
In 1856, John Torrey described Trillium sessile var. chloropetalum based on a specimen collected by John Milton Bigelow two years earlier in the "redwoods" of California. At the time, Bigelow was exploring the valleys and tributaries of the Sacramento and San Joaquin rivers, but the precise original location of his specimen remains unknown. In 1903, Thomas Jefferson Howell described the species Trillium chloropetalum based on Torrey's variety. The epithet chloropetalum means "green-petaled".

In 1975, John Daniel Freeman published an influential revision of subgenus Sessilia that included the description of a new species Trillium albidum J.D.Freeman and a completely new circumscription of Trillium chloropetalum (Torr.) Howell. By separating out white-flowered T. albidum, Freeman was able to provide a rational circumscription of T. chloropetalum that includes the following taxa:

- Trillium chloropetalum var. chloropetalum
- Trillium chloropetalum var. giganteum (Hook. & Arn.) Munz

The petals of T. chloropetalum var. chloropetalum always show yellow pigments but these are often masked by purple or other pigments. In contrast, the petals of T. chloropetalum var. giganteum lack yellow pigments altogether. The former is characterized by the green-petaled form described by Torrey while the latter includes a white-flowered form of T. chloropetalum distinguished from T. albidum by the presence of dark purple stamens and carpels.

Freeman's treatment of Trillium chloropetalum is widely (if not universally) accepted. Some authorities consider Trillium chloropetalum var. giganteum to be a synonym for Trillium chloropetalum, but even those authorities cite Freeman.

== Distribution and habitat ==
Trillium chloropetalum is endemic to California. Some authorities claim the species ranges across ten California counties, from Monterey County on the central California coast to Lake County in the north central part of the state:

- Alameda, Contra Costa, Lake, Marin, Monterey, Napa, San Mateo, Santa Clara, Santa Cruz, Sonoma

Other authorities claim that T. chloropetalum has a broader range that extends northward to Siskiyou County or southward to Santa Barbara County.

T. chloropetalum is found at the edges of redwood forests and chaparral, usually on moist slopes, canyon banks, and alluvial soils.

== Uses ==
The variety Trillium chloropetalum var. giganteum, with its deep maroon flower petals, gained the Award of Garden Merit (AGM) from the Royal Horticultural Society in 1993.

== Gallery ==
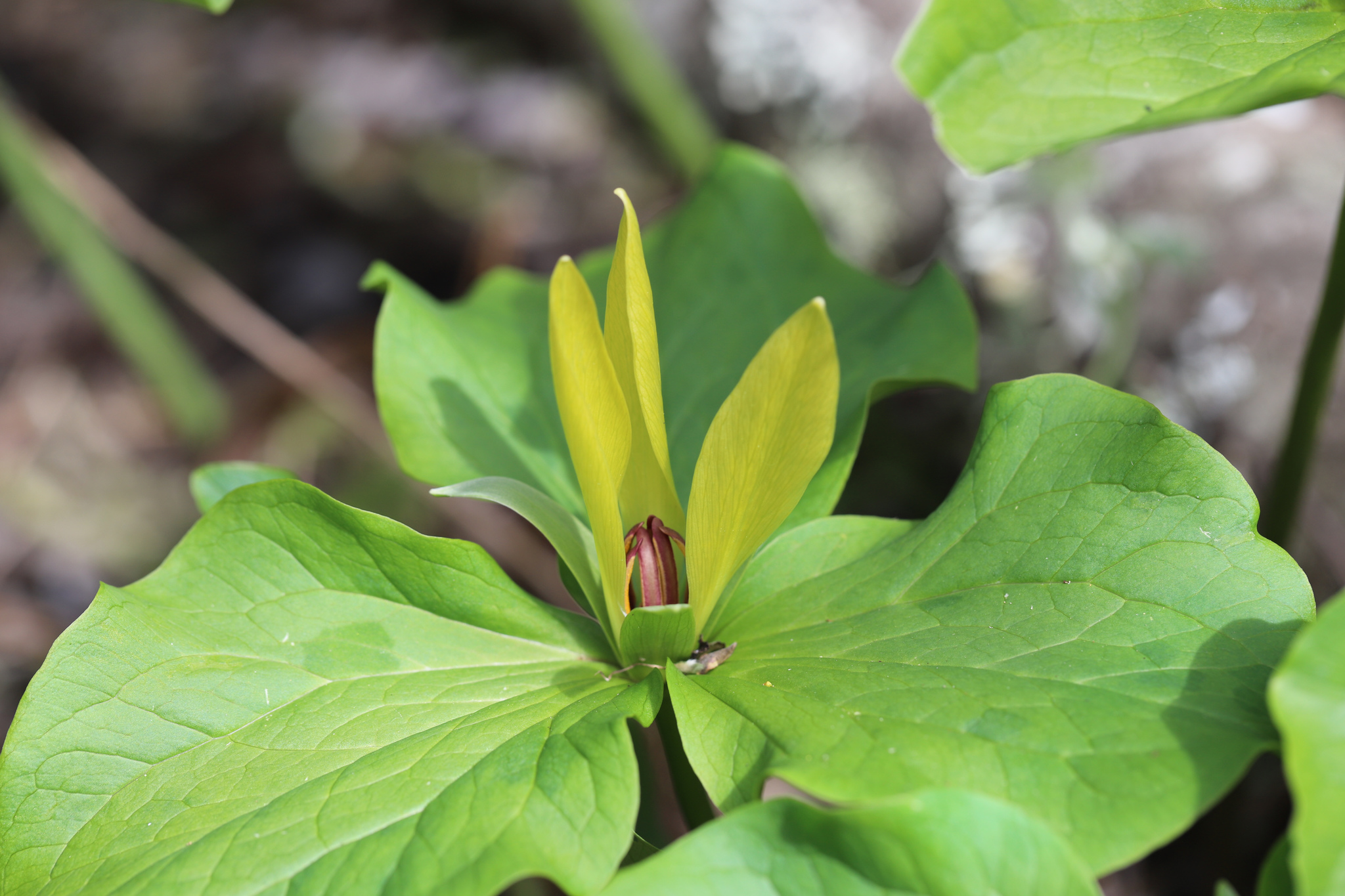
Variety chloropetalum with yellowish-green petals (March 17 in Marin County, CA)

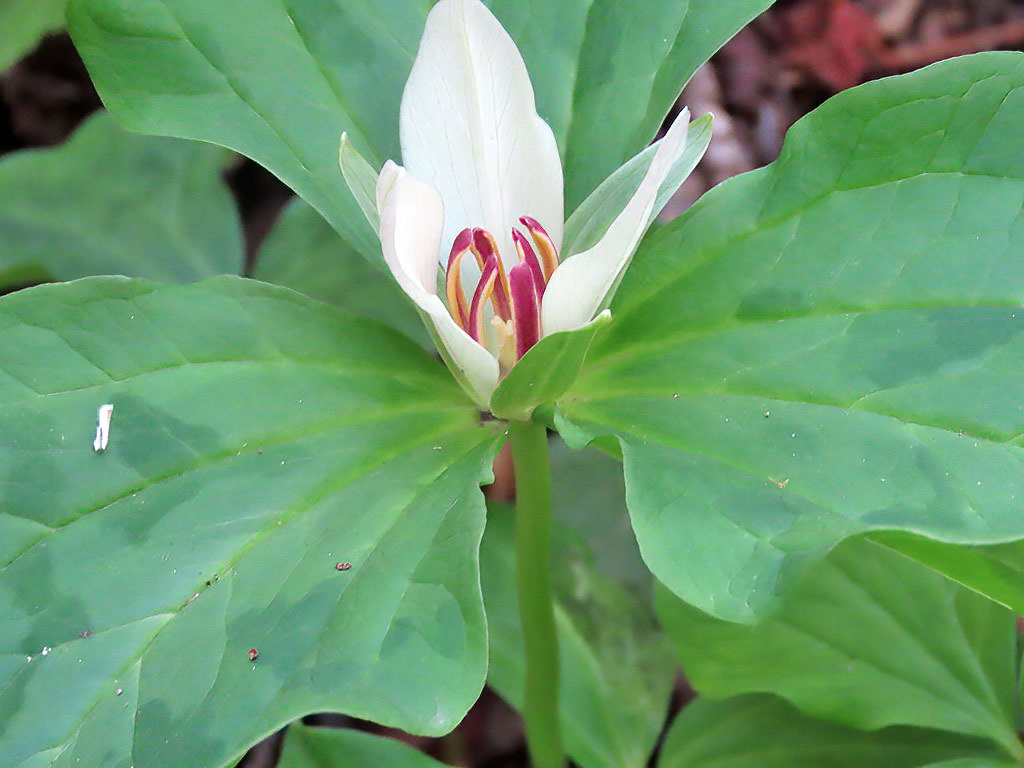
Variety giganteum with white petals and reddish-purple anther connective tissue (March 6 in San Mateo County, CA)

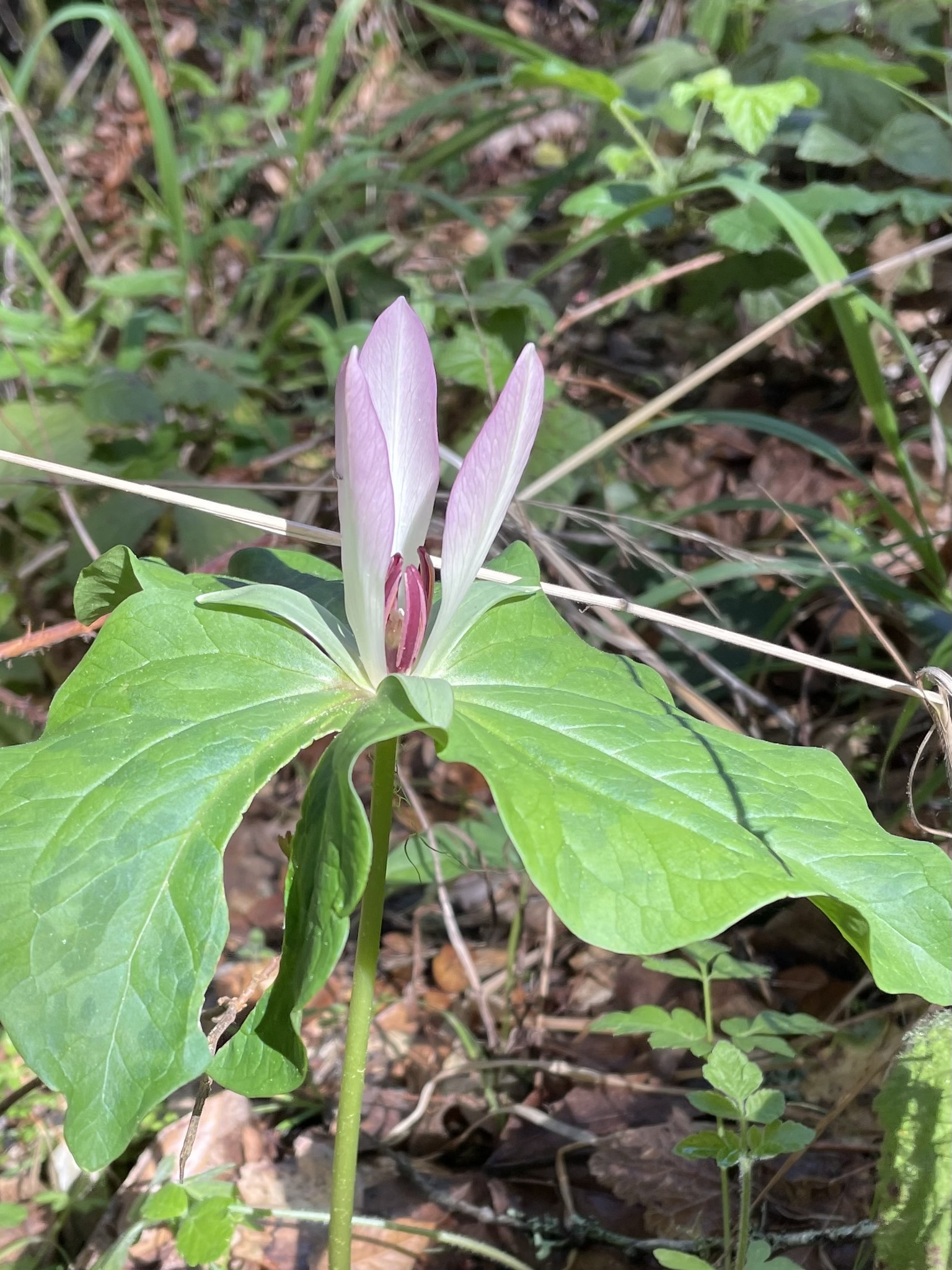
With pinkish petals (March 20 in San Mateo County, California)

== See also ==
- Pacific Railroad Surveys

== Bibliography ==
- Case, Frederick W.; Case, Roberta B. (1997). Trilliums. Portland, Oregon: Timber Press. ISBN 978-0-88192-374-2.
- Freeman, J. D. (1975). "Revision of Trillium subgenus Phyllantherum (Liliaceae)". Brittonia. 27 (1): 1–62. Bibcode:1975Britt..27....1F. doi:10.2307/2805646. JSTOR 2805646. S2CID 20824379.
