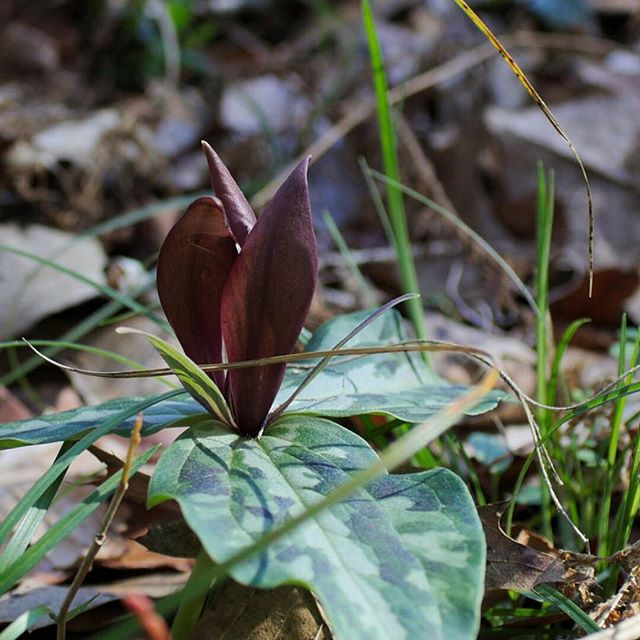

Scientific classification
- Kingdom: Plantae
- Clade: Tracheophytes
- Clade: Angiosperms
- Clade: Monocots
- Order: Liliales
- Family: Melanthiaceae
- Genus: Trillium
- Species: T. underwoodii

Binomial name
- Trillium underwoodii Small

Synonyms
- Trillium lanceolatum var. rectistamineum R.R.Gates; Trillium rectistamineum (R.R.Gates) H.St.John

= Trillium underwoodii =

Species of flowering plant

Trillium underwoodii, the longbract wakerobin, is a plant species found only in the southeastern United States (Alabama, Georgia, and northern Florida).

Trillium underwoodii is a perennial herb up to 20 cm tall, spreading by means of underground rhizomes. Leaves are multi-toned, with light, medium and dark splotches. Flowers are foul-smelling, usually deep maroon or purplish red but occasionally yellow.
