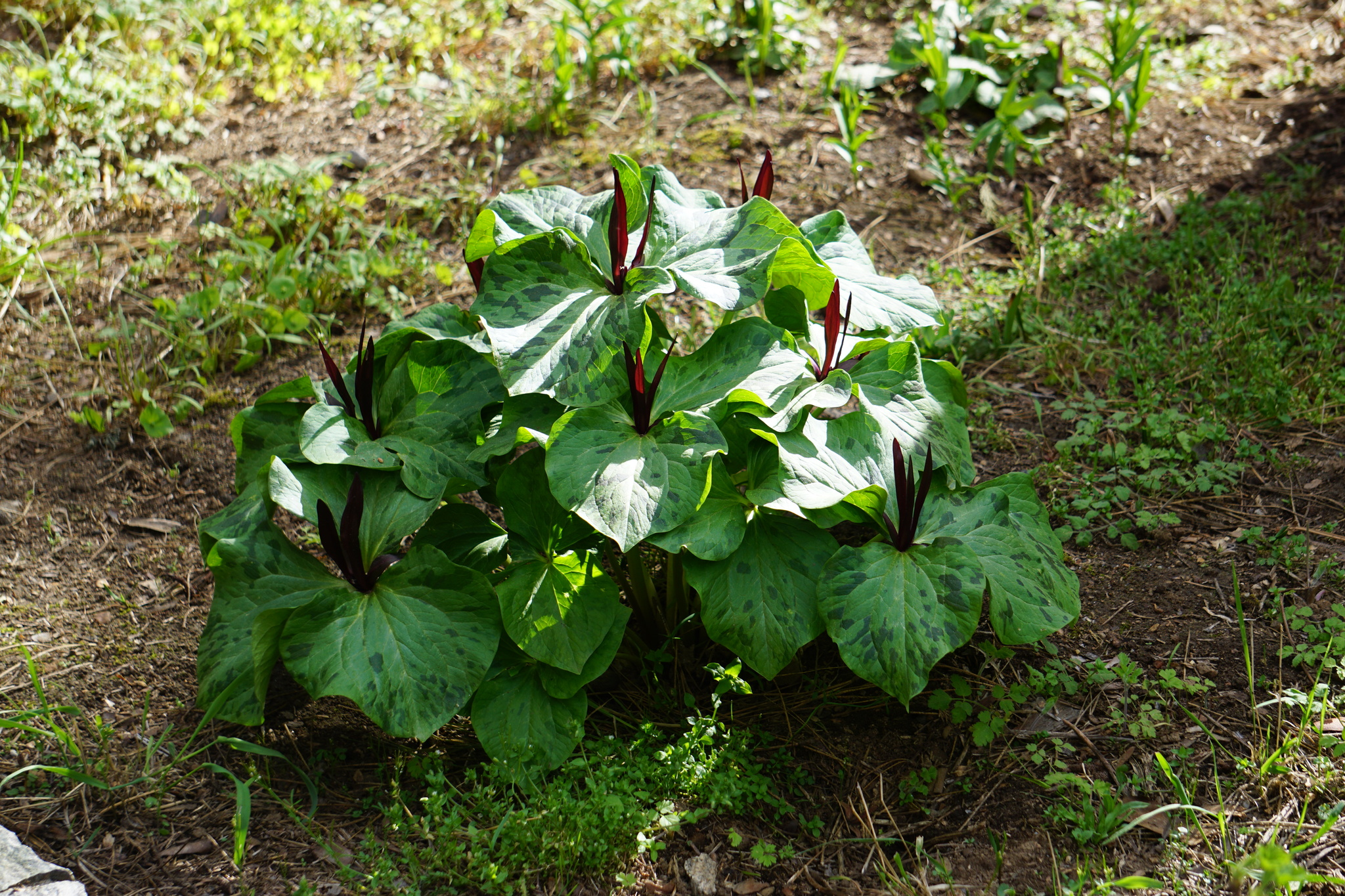
- Calaveras Big Trees State Park in Calaveras and Tuolumne counties, California

Conservation status
- Data Deficient (IUCN 3.1)

- Apparently Secure (NatureServe)

Scientific classification
- Kingdom: Plantae
- Clade: Tracheophytes
- Clade: Angiosperms
- Clade: Monocots
- Order: Liliales
- Family: Melanthiaceae
- Genus: Trillium
- Species: T. angustipetalum

Binomial name
- Trillium angustipetalum (Torr.) J.D.Freeman

Synonyms
- T. angustipetalum: Trillium chloropetalum var. angustipetalum (Torr.) Munz; Trillium giganteum var. angustipetalum (Torr.) R.R.Gates; Trillium sessile var. angustipetalum Torr.

= Trillium angustipetalum =

Species of flowering plant

Trillium angustipetalum, with the common name is narrowpetal wakerobin, is a species of Trillium, plants which may be included within the Liliaceae (lily family) or the newer family Melanthiaceae.

== Description ==
Trillium angustipetalum is a rhizomatous perennial herb with one or more erect stems growing up to 70 centimetres (28 in) in height. There is a whorl of three large leaves generally described as bracts each measuring up to 25 centimetres (9.8 in) in length and round or somewhat oval. They are green and mottled with brownish or darker green spots.

Each stem produces one flower, which is held on top of the bracts. The ill-scented flower has three lance-shaped green or red sepals and three narrow purple or maroon petals measuring up to 11 centimetres (4.3 in) long.

== Taxonomy ==
In 1856, John Torrey described Trillium sessile var. angustipetalum based on a specimen collected by John Milton Bigelow two years earlier in California. In 1975, John Daniel Freeman described the species Trillium angustipetalum based on Torrey's variety. The epithet angustipetalum means "narrow-petaled".

== Distribution ==
The plant is native to northern and central California and southwestern Oregon, where it occurs in forests, woodlands, chaparral, and riparian zones. It is found in the Klamath Mountains, western Sierra Nevada foothills, and Outer Southern California Coast Ranges.

== Bibliography ==
- Case, Frederick W.; Case, Roberta B. (1997). Trilliums. Portland, Oregon: Timber Press. pp. 204–208. ISBN 978-0-88192-374-2.
- Freeman, J. D. (1975). "Revision of Trillium subgenus Phyllantherum (Liliaceae)". Brittonia. 27 (1): 1–62. Bibcode:1975Britt..27....1F. doi:10.2307/2805646. JSTOR 2805646. S2CID 20824379.
