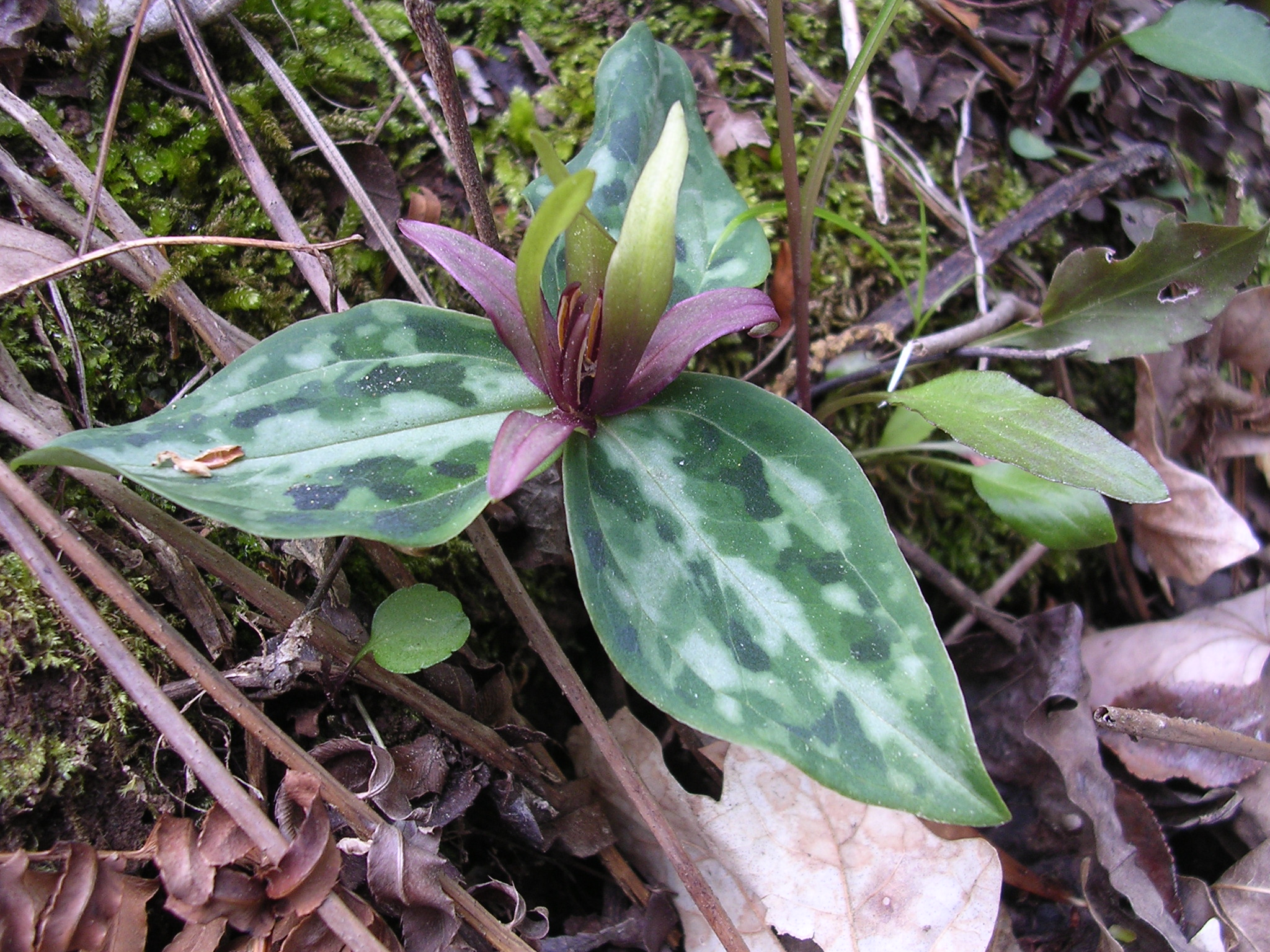
- Trillium reliquum demonstrating its three mottled elliptical, pointed leaves

Conservation status
- Near Threatened (IUCN 3.1)

- Endangered (ESA)

Scientific classification
- Kingdom: Plantae
- Clade: Tracheophytes
- Clade: Angiosperms
- Clade: Monocots
- Order: Liliales
- Family: Melanthiaceae
- Genus: Trillium
- Species: T. reliquum

Binomial name
- Trillium reliquum J.D.Freeman

= Trillium reliquum =

Species of flowering plant

Trillium reliquum, the relict trillium, Confederate wakerobin, or Confederate trillium, is a monocotyledon species of the genus Trillium, a perennial, flowering, herbaceous plant of the family Liliaceae. It is found only in the southeastern region of the United States: southeast Alabama and central and west Georgia, with a disjunct population in east Georgia and southwest South Carolina. As a relict species, there are a few remaining groups but it was once more abundant when conditions were different. Significant habitat loss has occurred through clearing of forests for agricultural and pine farm uses.

Effective May 4, 1988, Trillium reliquum received protection as a federally listed endangered species under the Endangered Species Act of 1973. The common name varies by location. It grows in undisturbed hardwood forests that sometimes include mature pines and that are free of understory plants such as bushes and vines. It likes moist, well-drained soils along the banks of streams and small stream floodplains, mixed with other wildflowers and forest debris.

Trillium reliquum was first collected near Augusta in 1901 but was not described as a new species until 1975.

== Description ==
Trillium reliquum has a sessile flower on a curved stem at the center of its three mottled leaves that are blue-green, to green to silver in color. It flowers from March to April. From the end of a stocky underground rhizome, the plant sprouts a single shoot topped by the three mottled leaves and a single sessile flower; the flower is only half the size of the leaves. The stem is normally not erect, but rather lies along the ground. The flower consists of three petals, alternating with three sepals. The flowers can be greenish to brownish-purple and even pure yellow at times. Its three sepals spread out and usually are a purple color on the inside. The three petals tend to be erect and somewhat twisted, varying from dark purple to yellow in color. The petals are about twice as long as the stamens. The fruit, which is a round, fleshy capsule, appears from May to June.

== Future ==
The U.S. Fish & Wildlife Service lists this plant as surviving in 21 sites in Alabama, Georgia and South Carolina. The reasons for the restrictions of this formerly widespread plant to only a few locations is not entirely clear. It is not commonly collected in the wild (for aesthetic or other uses) and is therefore considered relatively safe, in spite of its endangerment. There is no evidence that its numbers have declined recently.
