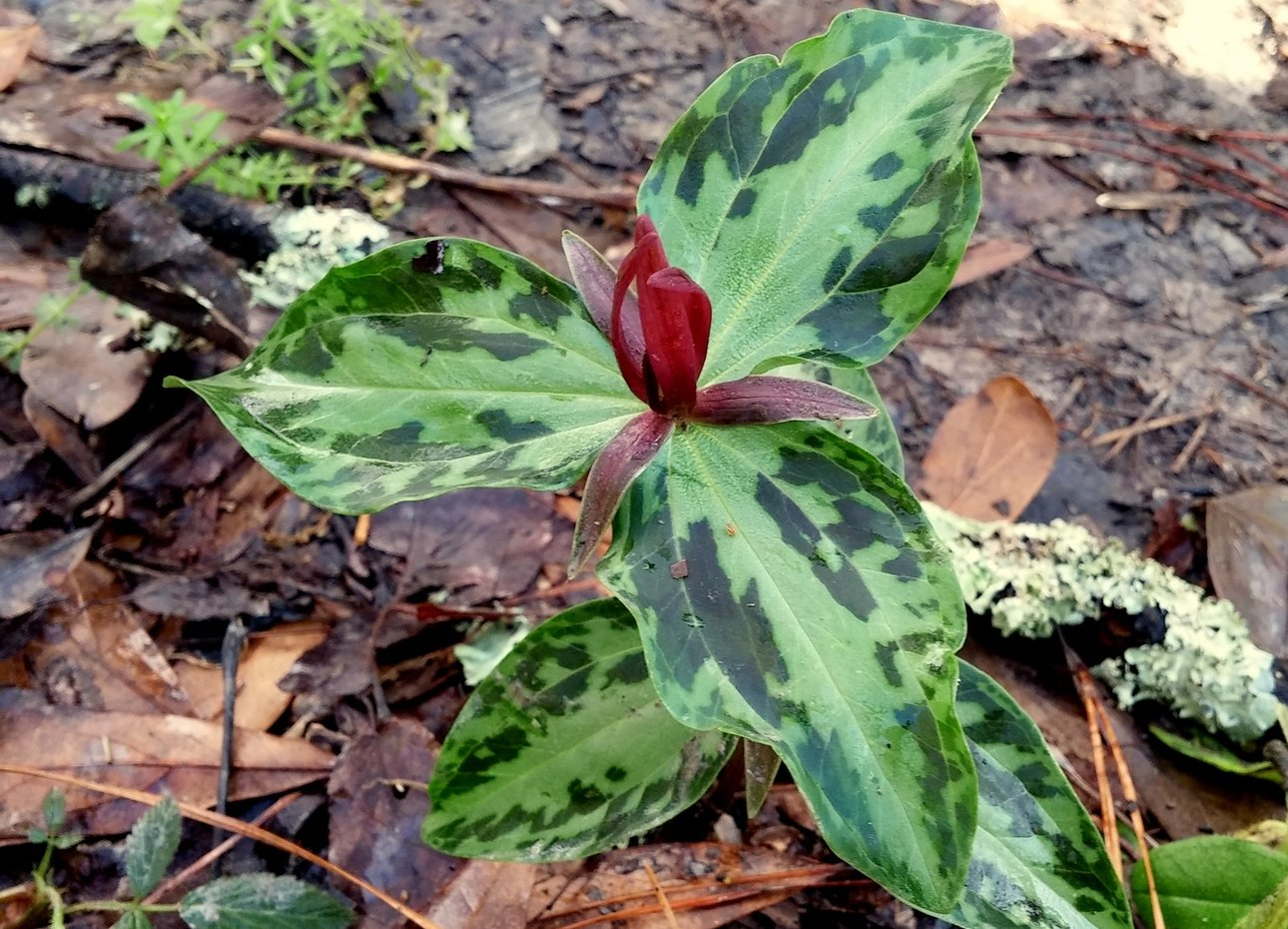
- Trillium foetidissimum in bloom in Baton Rouge, LA, USA

Conservation status
- Vulnerable (NatureServe)

Scientific classification
- Kingdom: Plantae
- Clade: Tracheophytes
- Clade: Angiosperms
- Clade: Monocots
- Order: Liliales
- Family: Melanthiaceae
- Genus: Trillium
- Species: T. foetidissimum

Binomial name
- Trillium foetidissimum J.D.Freeman, 1975

Synonyms
- Trillium foetidissimum f. luteum J.D.Freeman

= Trillium foetidissimum =

Species of flowering plant

Trillium foetidissimum, also known as the Mississippi River wakerobin, stinking trillium, or fetid trillium, is a species of flowering plant in the family Melanthiaceae. It is found along the Louisiana–Mississippi border in a variety of habitats.

Trillium foetidissimum is a perennial herbaceous plant that blooms from early March to early April.

== Description ==
The plant is brown colored with horizontal rhizomes and bracts. It carries 1-2 scapes which are 0.8–2.8 decimetres (3.1–11.0 in) from green to maroon-colored and are round at cross section. Leaves are either light or bronze-green in color. Sepals are located above the bracts and are green colored, horizontal, and lanceolate. They are 16–40 millimetres (0.63–1.57 in) long and 4–6 millimetres (0.16–0.24 in) wide and are thick. Petals are erect while apex is acute. Flaments are 3–6 millimetres (0.12–0.24 in) long and are dark maroon in color while stamens are 9–25 millimetres (0.35–0.98 in) and are both erect and prominent. Anthlers are straight, 8–15 millimetres (0.31–0.59 in) long, and are blackish-maroon in color. The species also have erect and ovate ovary which is 5–12 millimetres (0.20–0.47 in) long and is reddish-purple in color. Stigma is also erect and dark purple in color but is subulate and fleshy unlike the ovary. The flower is sessile, of a maroon color fading to brown with narrow lanceolate petals. It emits a smell of rotting meat to attract insect pollinators, hence the name. Its leaves are strongly mottled. The flower turns to a purple-brown berry in autumn.
