= Chinese windmill =

Chinese windmill may refer to

- Byasa alcinous, a swallowtail butterfly native to eastern China and parts of the Himalayas
- Byasa plutonius, a swallowtail native to western China and parts of the Himalayas
- Trachycarpus fortunei, a palm tree native to central China, southern Japan, northern Burma and northern India
