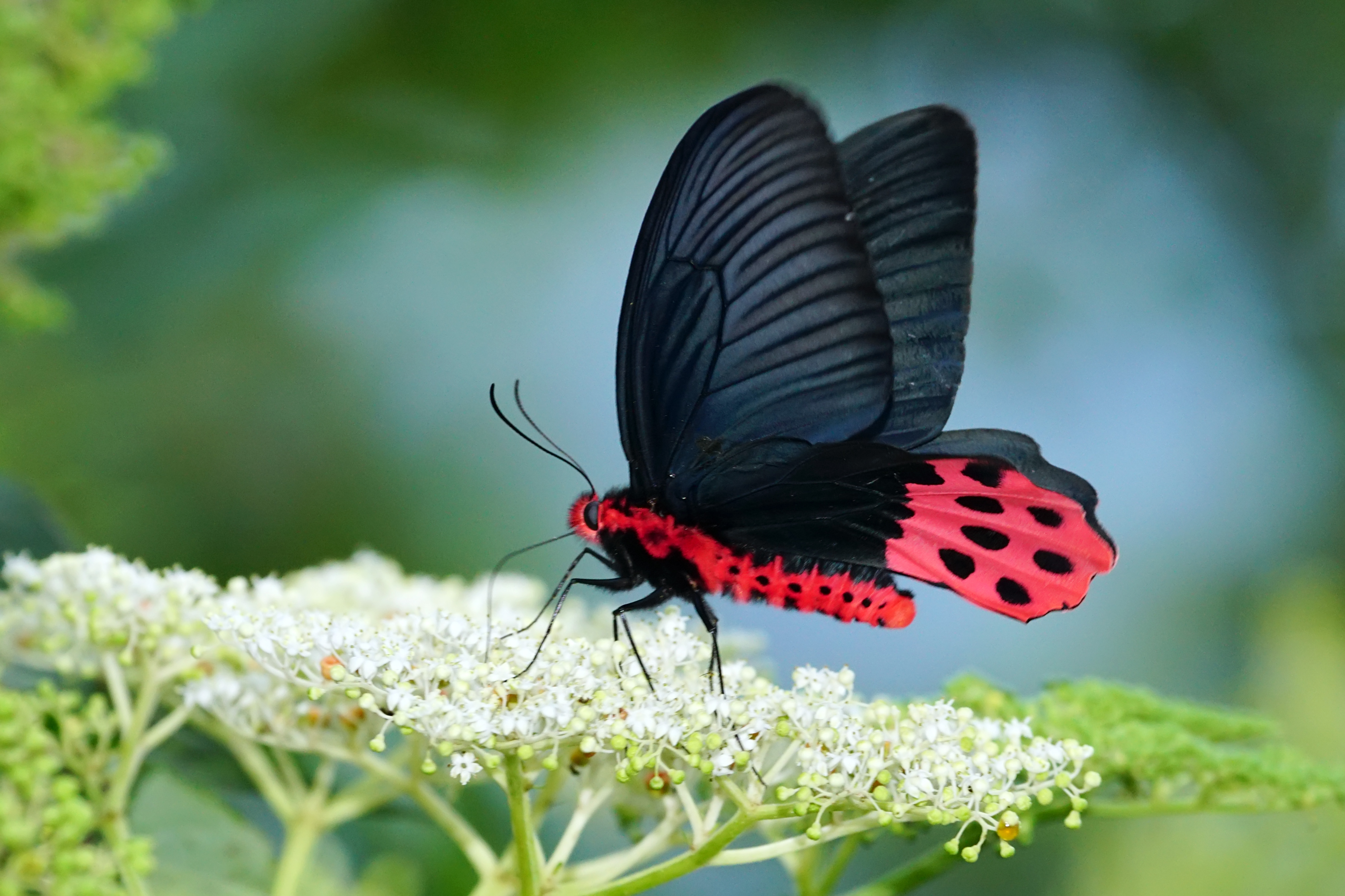
- Male
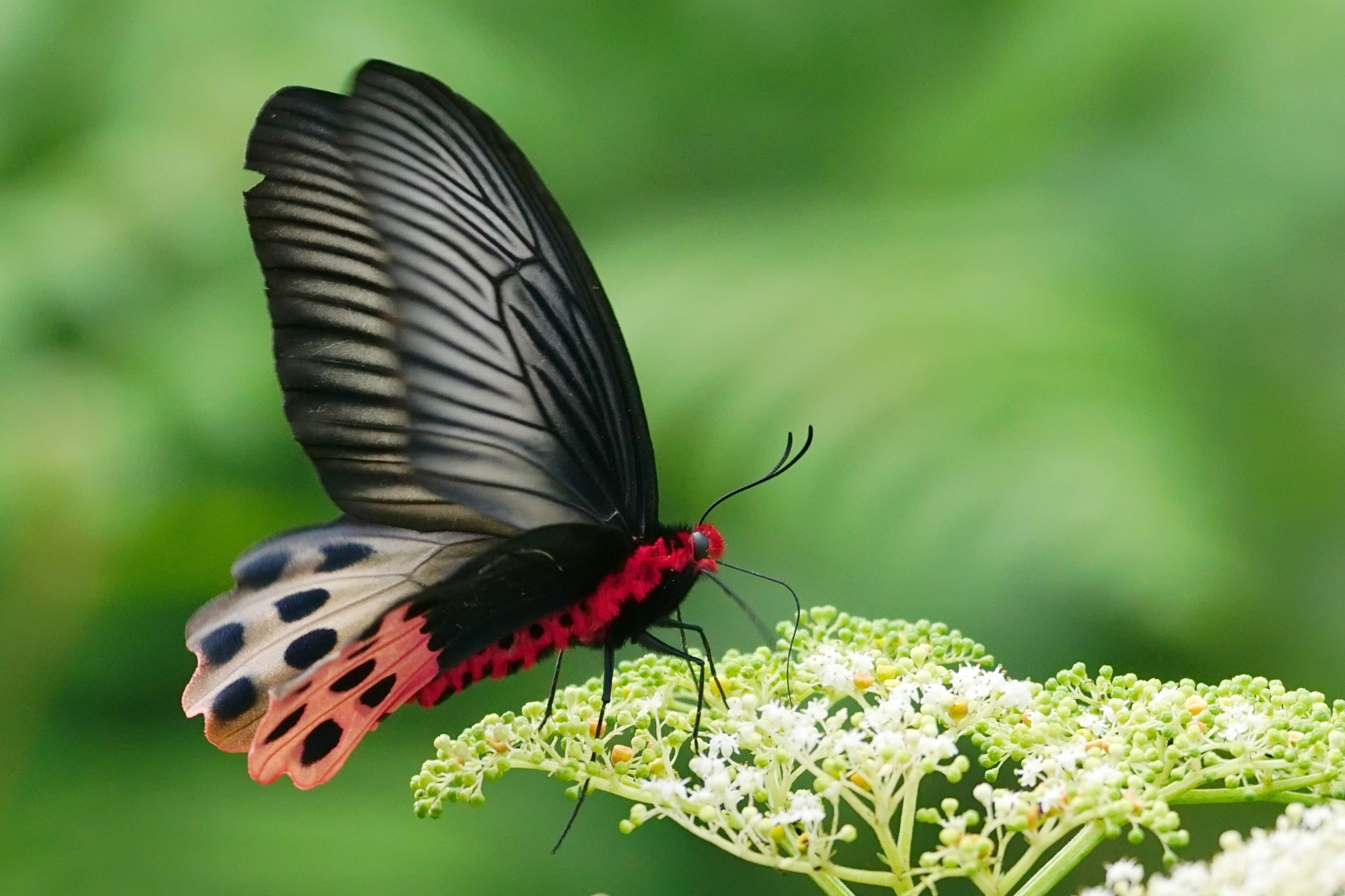
- Female

Scientific classification
- Kingdom: Animalia
- Phylum: Arthropoda
- Clade: Pancrustacea
- Class: Insecta
- Order: Lepidoptera
- Family: Papilionidae
- Genus: Atrophaneura
- Species: A. horishana

Binomial name
- Atrophaneura horishana (Matsumura, 1910)

Synonyms
- Papilio horishanus Matsumura, 1910; Atrophaneura horishanus; Papilio sauteri Hayne, 1913

= Atrophaneura horishana =

Aurora swallowtail

Species of butterfly

Atrophaneura horishana, the aurora batwing or aurora swallowtail, is a species of butterfly from the family Papilionidae that is found in Taiwan.

The wingspan is 110–130 mm. The wings are black. The body has red hairs. There is a large red patch on the underside of each hindwing. The wing veins are bordered in white.

== Biology ==
Adults visit flowers. The eggs are yellow and spherical. The larvae have prominent tubercles, a whitish black ground colour and two white bands on the third and fourth abdominal segments. The larvae feed on species of Aristolochia - A. shimadai and A. liukiuensis. It is in general found at 1,000–2,500 m in elevation and is only abundant in primary forests.

== Status ==
Common, but status should be monitored.

== Taxonomy ==
Has been ranked as a subspecies of Atrophaneura nox.
