= Byasa rhadinus =

Scientific classification
- Kingdom: Animalia
- Phylum: Arthropoda
- Clade: Pancrustacea
- Class: Insecta
- Order: Lepidoptera
- Family: Papilionidae
- Genus: Byasa
- Species: B. rhadinus

Binomial name
- Byasa rhadinus (Jordan, 1928)

Synonyms
- Atrophaneura mencius rhadinus; Atrophaneura rhadinus Jordan, 1928

Species of butterfly

Byasa rhadinus is a species of butterfly from the family Papilionidae. It is found in China.

== Taxonomy ==
Originally described as Papilio mencius Felder, 1862 subsp. rhadinus Jordan, 1928, this butterfly was considered conspecific with Atrophaneura mencius (e.g., Collins & Morris 1985, Fujioka et al. 1997). It has been reclassified as a viable species by Chou (1994).
