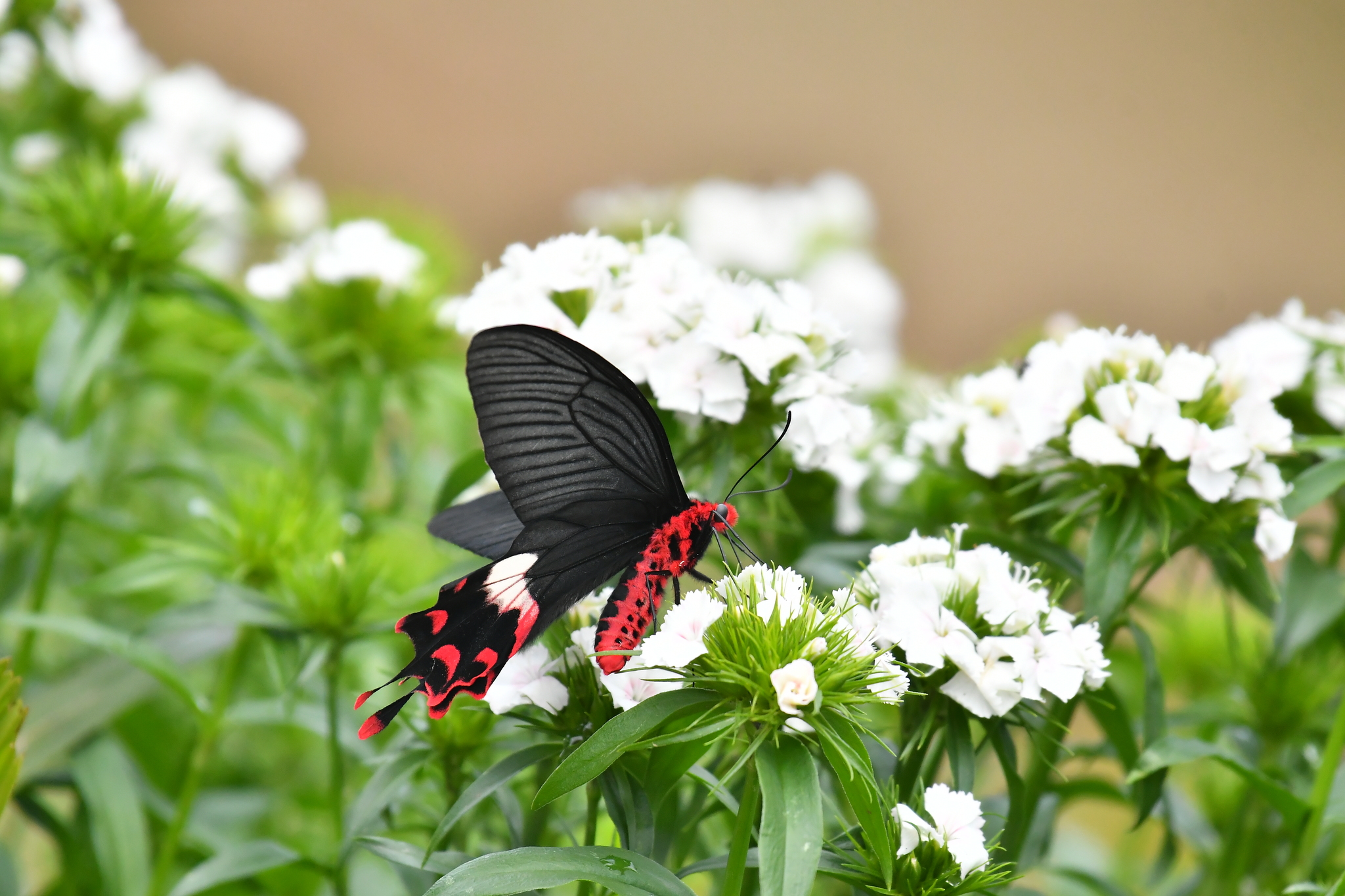

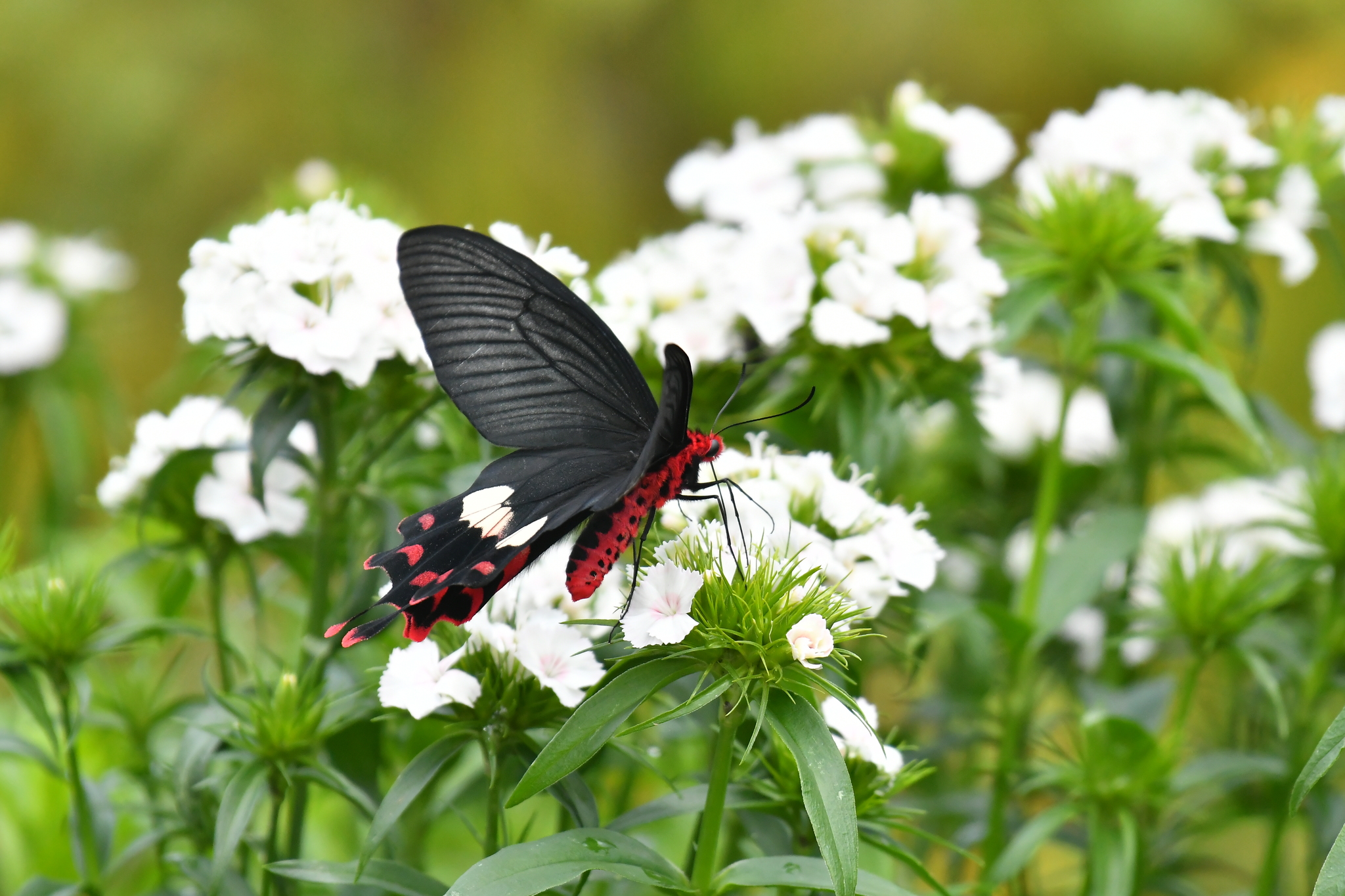

Scientific classification
- Kingdom: Animalia
- Phylum: Arthropoda
- Class: Insecta
- Order: Lepidoptera
- Family: Papilionidae
- Genus: Byasa
- Species: B. polla

Binomial name
- Byasa polla (De Nicéville, 1897)

= Byasa polla =

De Nicéville's windmill

Species of butterfly

Byasa polla, the De Nicéville's windmill, is a butterfly found in India that belongs to the windmills genus (Byasa), comprising tailed black swallowtail butterflies with white spots and red submarginal crescents.

== Range ==
It is found in north east India, Myanmar (eastern Bhamo and Bernardmyo of Shan states), northern Thailand, northern Laos and south western China.

In India, it is found in the states of Assam, Arunachal Pradesh, Manipur and the Chin hills in Nagaland.

== Status ==
It is very rare and protected by law in India. More information is needed on the distribution and status.

== Description ==
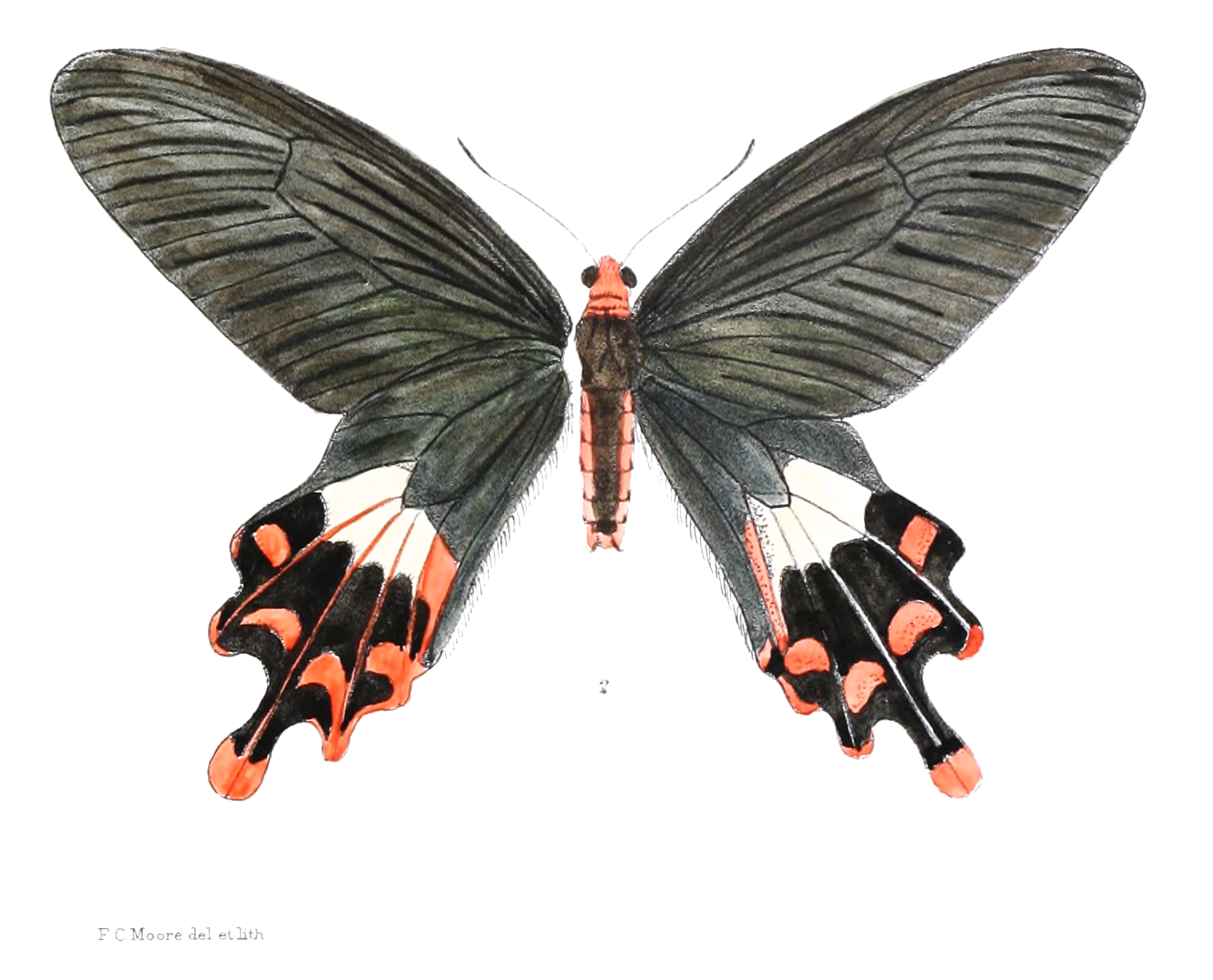
Male

- Wingspan: 110–130 mm.
- Similar to the rose windmill (Byasa latreillei) but the fringe from tornus to vein 3 is vermilion red and not black.

Male "Very closely resembles B. latreilli male, but judging by a single specimen the fore wing is proportionately rather narrower, the termen more oblique, the tornus more rounded. The markings on the hind wing differ as follows:—the discal white patch composed of four elongate spots in interspaces 2-4, that in interspace 4 very broad, filling the interspace between the middle of veins 5 and 6; subterminal series of lunules larger than in latreilli, and all vermilion-red, not crimson, both on the upper and undersides; cilia between tornus and apex of vein 3, apex of tail and cilia at apex of vein 5 vermilion-red. On the underside, the spot of the discal patch in interspace 1 is vermilion-red, and the red lunule of the subterminal series in interspace 2 is produced to the vermilion-red terminal edging below it. Antennas, head, thorax and abdomen as in P. latreillei."

Female. "Appears to differ only from the male on the upperside of the hind wing in the white patch, which is continued posteriorly to the abdominal margin or nearly so and does not extend into the end of the cell." (de Nicéville, quoted in Bingham)

"This seems to be a very rare insect, at any rate within British territory, only single specimens seem to have been taken so far. Of these, one, a female, now in the British Museum, I took at over 5000 feet elevation, on the shoulder of the hillside on which were built the barracks for the troops at Bernardmyo, in the Ruby Mines district, Upper Burma."

== Taxonomy ==
No separate subspecies have been described.

== Habits ==
Recorded from Manipur to Nagaland in June.

== See also ==
- Papilionidae
- List of butterflies of India
- List of butterflies of India (Papilionidae)
