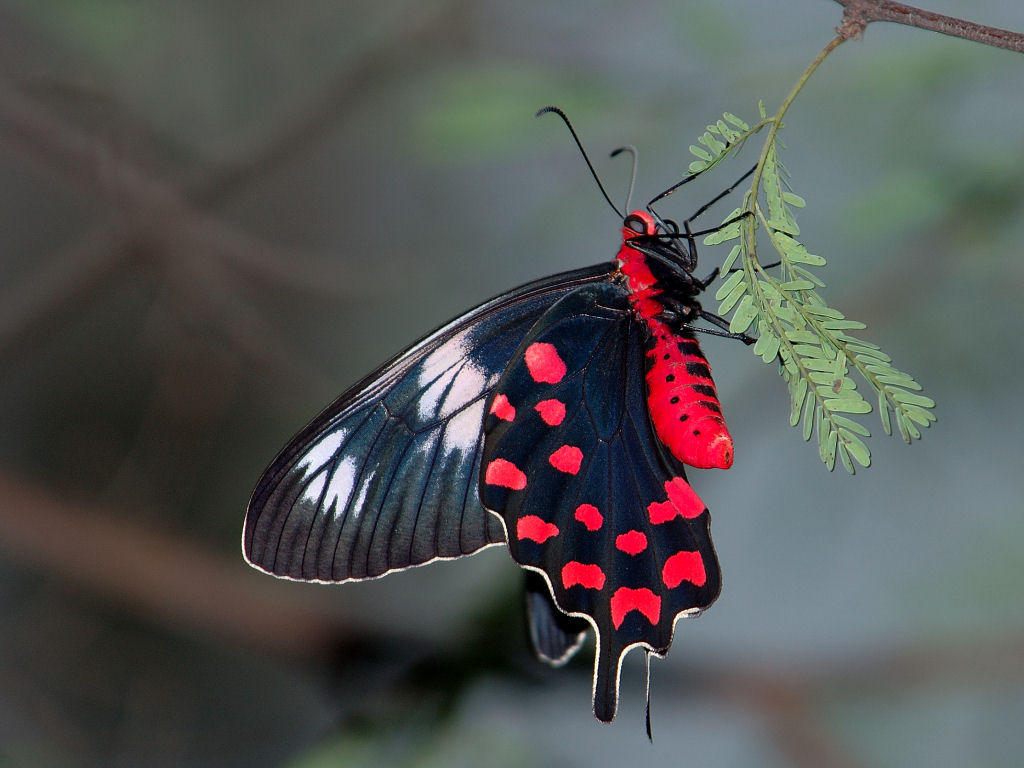
- Pachliopta hector

Scientific classification
- Kingdom: Animalia
- Phylum: Arthropoda
- Clade: Pancrustacea
- Class: Insecta
- Order: Lepidoptera
- Family: Papilionidae
- Subfamily: Papilioninae
- Tribe: Troidini

Species
- About 46; see text

Groups included
- Atrophaneura Reakirt, [1865]; Byasa Moore, 1882; Losaria Moore, [1902]; Pachliopta Reakirt, [1865]

Synonyms
- Polydorus Swainson, [1833]; Pangerana Moore, 1886; Panosmia Wood-Mason & de Nicéville, 1886; Tros Kirby, 1896; Karanga Moore, [1902]; Balignina Moore, [1902]

= Red-bodied swallowtail =

Species of butterfly

Red-bodied swallowtails, or ruby swallowtail (due to the color), are butterflies in the swallowtail family, that belong to the genera Atrophaneura, Byasa, Losaria, or Pachliopta. They are generally found in Asia (Indomalayan realm).

Collectors have found the red-bodied swallowtails difficult to kill. Pinching the thorax, a method which kills most butterflies, is withstood and only stuns the butterfly temporarily.

== Life history ==
The larvae resemble those of other Troidini. Fleshy spine-like tubercles, often with red tips, line the caterpillars' backs, and their bodies are dark red to brown and velvety black or shades of grey with a pattern of black lines. They feed on species of Aristolochia and Thottea. Chrysalids are camouflaged to look like a dead leaf or twig. They are attached by a girdle and an anal pad. Adults are nectar feeding.

Many species of red-bodied swallowtails show aposematism, and serve as models for Batesian mimicry. The biology of Pachliopta hector and Pachliopta aristolochiae are well studied.

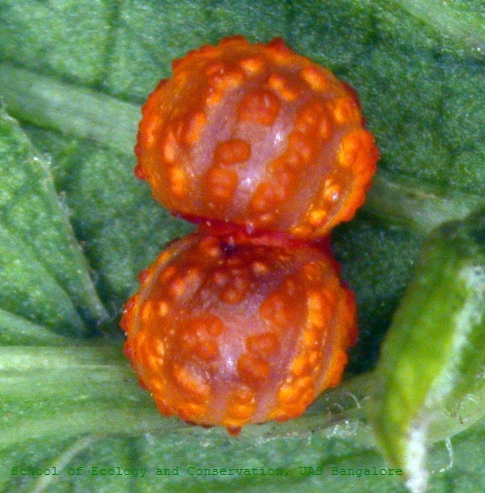
Pachliopta hector egg

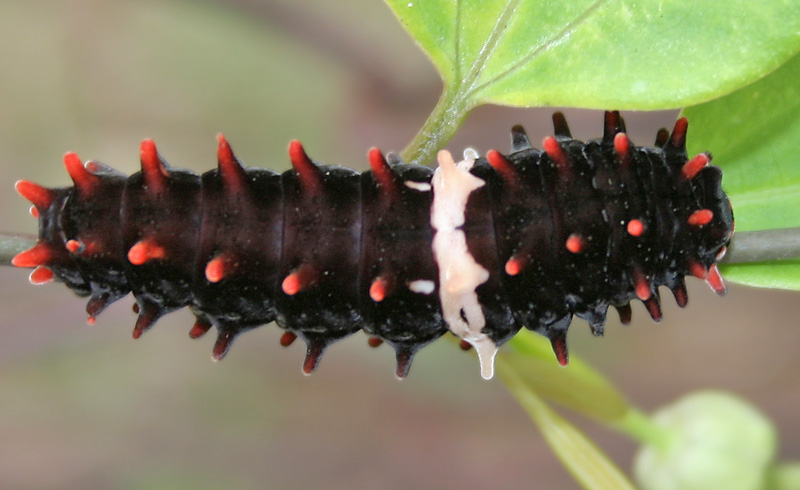
Pachliopta aristolochiae larva

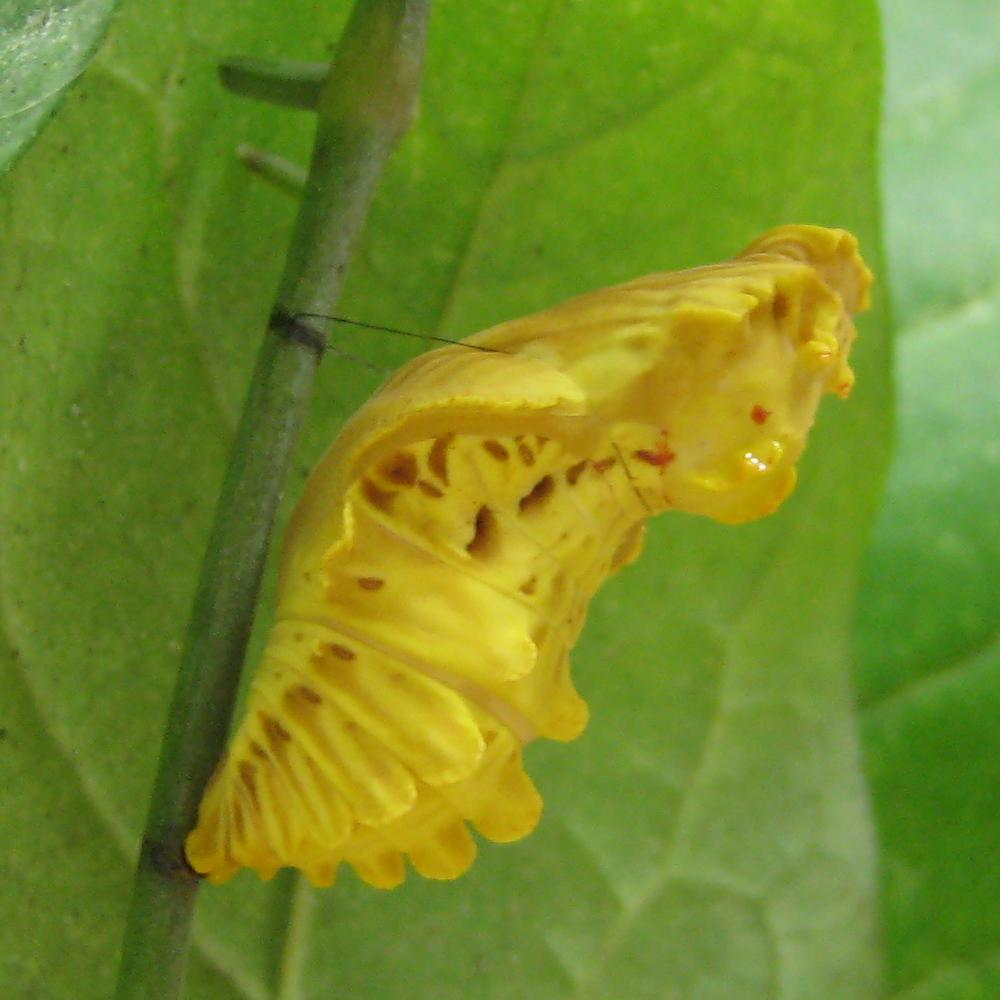
Byasa alcinous pupa

== Taxonomy ==
Species limits may be either narrow (many species - forma and subspecies raised to full or "good" species) or broad (fewer species - rank reduction) see Jürgen Haffer for a discussion.

=== Genera and species ===
Plate from Adalbert Seitz's Macrolepidoptera of the World, depicting species now in the genus Atrophaneura

Plate from Seitz's Macrolepidoptera of the World, depicting species now in the genera Losaria and Pachliopta.

Plate from Seitz's Macrolepidoptera of the World, depicting species now in the genus Pachliopta

Listed alphabetically within genera:

Genus: Atrophaneura Reakirt, [1865] (earlier considered as the nominotypical subgenus of Atrophaneura but now it is a genus without subgenera)

- Atrophaneura aidoneus (Doubleday, 1845) — lesser batwing
- Atrophaneura astorion (Westwood, 1842) — common batwing
- Atrophaneura dixoni (Grose-Smith, 1900) — Dixon’s Batwing
- Atrophaneura hageni (Rogenhofer, 1889)
- Atrophaneura horishana (Matsumura, 1910) — aurora batwing
- Atrophaneura kuehni (Honrath, 1886)
- Atrophaneura nox (Swainson, 1822) — Malayan batwing
- Atrophaneura priapus (Boisduval, 1836) — priapus batwing
- Atrophaneura semperi (C. & R. Felder, 1861) — Philippine batwing
- Atrophaneura sycorax (Grose-Smith, 1885) — white-headed batwing

Genus: Byasa Moore, 1882 (earlier considered as subgenus Byasa but now raised to genus level)

- Byasa adamsoni (Grose-Smith, 1886) — Adamson's rose
- Byasa alcinous (Klug, 1836) — Chinese windmill
- Byasa crassipes (Oberthür, 1893) — black windmill
- Byasa daemonius (Alphéraky, 1895)
- Byasa dasarada (Moore, 1857) — great windmill
- Byasa hedistus (Jordan, 1928)
- Byasa impediens (Rothschild, 1895)
- Byasa laos (Riley & Godfrey, 1921)
- Byasa latreillei (Donovan, 1826) — rose windmill
- Byasa mencius (C. & R. Felder, 1862)
- Byasa nevilli (Wood-Mason, 1882) — Nevill's windmill
- Byasa plutonius (Oberthür, 1876) — Chinese windmill
- Byasa polla (de Nicéville, 1897) — De Niceville's windmill
- Byasa polyeuctes (Doubleday, 1842) — common windmill
- Byasa rhadinus (Jordan, 1928)

Genus: Losaria Moore, [1902] (earlier considered as subgenus Losaria but now raised to genus level)

- Losaria coon (Fabricius, 1793) — common clubtail
- Losaria palu (Martin, 1912) — Palu swallowtail - has been regarded a subspecies of A. coon
- Losaria rhodifer (Butler, 1876) — Andaman clubtail
- Losaria neptunus (Guérin-Méneville, 1840) — yellow-bodied club-tail or yellow club-tail

Genus: Pachliopta Reakirt, [1865] (earlier considered as subgenus Pachliopta but now raised to genus level)

- Pachliopta adamas (Zinken, 1831)
- Pachliopta antiphus (Fabricius, 1793)
- Pachliopta aristolochiae (Fabricius, 1775) — common rose swallowtail
- Pachliopta atropos (Staudinger, 1888) - mourning swallowtail
- Pachliopta hector (Linnaeus, 1758) — crimson rose swallowtail
- Pachliopta jophon (Gray, [1853]) — Sri Lankan rose swallowtail
- Pachliopta kotzebuea (Eschscholtz, 1821) — pink rose swallowtail
- [For Pachliopta leytensis (Murayama, 1978) see Pachliopta phegeus]
- Pachliopta liris (Godart, 1819) — Timor rose swallowtail
- Pachliopta mariae (Semper, 1878)
- Pachliopta oreon (Doherty, 1891)
- Pachliopta pandiyana (Moore, 1881) — Malabar rose swallowtail
- Pachliopta phegeus (Hopffer, 1866)
- Pachliopta phlegon (C. & R. Felder, 1864)
- Pachliopta polydorus (Linnaeus, 1763) — red-bodied swallowtail
- Pachliopta polyphontes (Boisduval, 1836)
- Pachliopta schadenbergi (Semper, 1891)
- Pachliopta strandi (Bryk, 1930)
