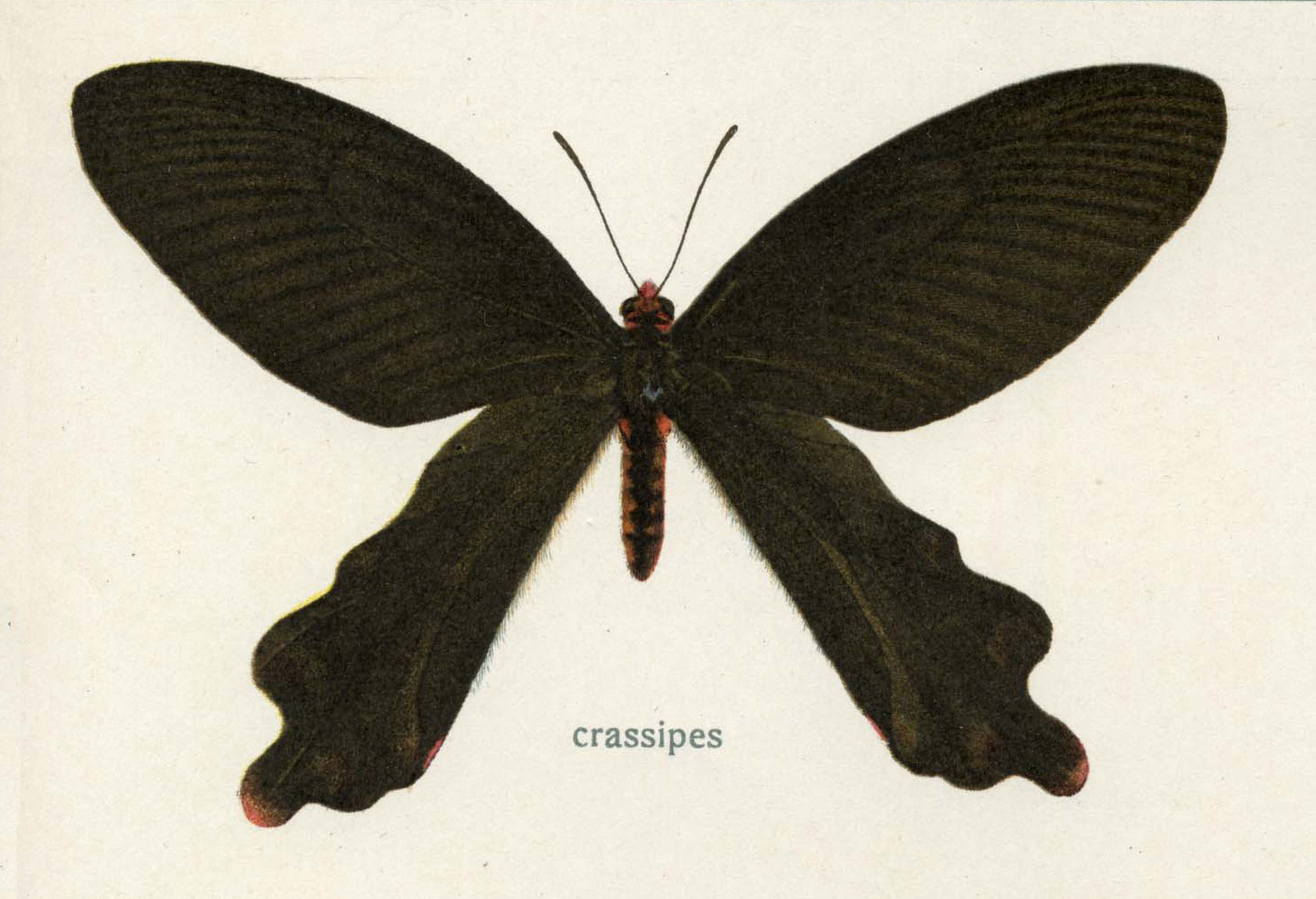

Scientific classification
- Domain: Eukaryota
- Kingdom: Animalia
- Phylum: Arthropoda
- Class: Insecta
- Order: Lepidoptera
- Family: Papilionidae
- Genus: Byasa
- Species: B. crassipes

Binomial name
- Byasa crassipes (Oberthür, 1879)

= Byasa crassipes =

Black windmill

Species of butterfly

Byasa crassipes, the black windmill, is a butterfly found in India and Southeast Asia that belongs to the windmills genus, Byasa, comprising tailed black swallowtail butterflies with white spots and red submarginal crescents.

== Range ==
Northeast India (Manipur), Myanmar (southern Shan states), northern Thailand, northern Laos, northern Vietnam (Tonkin), and possibly southern China.

== Status ==
The black windmill is very rare and is protected by law in India. More information is required on this species.

== Description ==
The wingspan is 110–120 mm. It is a black butterfly which is unmarked except for obscure red spots on the upper hindwing. The tail is red tipped below.

Male upperside: Forewing dark fuliginous (sooty) black, with black veins, a longitudinal streak between the veins and streaks within the cell. Hindwing very narrow anteriorly and much prolonged posteriorly, exterior margin broadly scalloped, tail very broad and short; abdominal margin with a very long folded lappet, which when opened displays a lengthened greyish-white woolly androconial patch; colour dull greyish black, with two upper marginal and two sub-anal lunules, tip of the tail very obscure dusky red. Underside: forewing paler. Hindwing dull black, with the two upper and lower marginal lunules, an irregular-shaped anal lunule, and the tail tip bright crimson. Thorax and abdomen above black; front of head and thorax and abdomen beneath crimson; abdomen beneath with black segmental bands; hind tibiae very thick; antennae and legs black.

== Taxonomy ==
No separate subspecies have been described.

== Habits ==
Recorded from Manipur between 1,000 and 2,500 ft (300 and 760 m).

== See also ==
- Papilionidae
- List of butterflies of India
- List of butterflies of India (Papilionidae)
