= Pachliopta strandi =

- Adalbert Seitz Fauna Indo Australica as annae

Scientific classification
- Kingdom: Animalia
- Phylum: Arthropoda
- Clade: Pancrustacea
- Class: Insecta
- Order: Lepidoptera
- Family: Papilionidae
- Genus: Pachliopta
- Species: P. strandi

Binomial name
- Pachliopta strandi Page & Treadaway, 2003

Synonyms
- Papilio strandi Bryk, 1930; Papilio annae Rothschild, 1895; Atrophaneura strandi (Bryk, 1930); Pachliopta annae

Species of butterfly

Pachliopta strandi is a species of butterfly from the family Papilionidae that is found in the Philippines.

== Subspecies ==
- Pachliopta strandi strandi (Philippines: Mindoro)
- Pachliopta strandi marinduquensis (Page & Treadaway, 1997) (Philippines: Marinduque)
- Pachliopta strandi nuydaorum (Page & Treadaway, 1997) (Philippines: Luzon)
- Pachliopta strandi splendida (Schröder & Treadaway, 1984) (Philippines: Sibuyan)
- Pachliopta strandi elizabethi (Page & Treadaway, 1997) (Philippines: Panay, Guiamaras)
