= Pachliopta atropos =

Conservation status
- Near Threatened (IUCN 3.1)

Scientific classification
- Kingdom: Animalia
- Phylum: Arthropoda
- Clade: Pancrustacea
- Class: Insecta
- Order: Lepidoptera
- Family: Papilionidae
- Genus: Pachliopta
- Species: P. atropos

Binomial name
- Pachliopta atropos Staudinger, 1888

Species of butterfly

Pachliopta atropos is a species of butterfly in the family Papilionidae. It is endemic to the Philippines.

The first description was in 1888 by Staudinger. The wingspan is about 8 – 9 cm. The ground colour of the forewing is grey with dark-brown or black veins and markings. The scalloped hindwing is black. The red abdomen has darkened spots.

== See also ==
- Ecoregions in the Philippines
