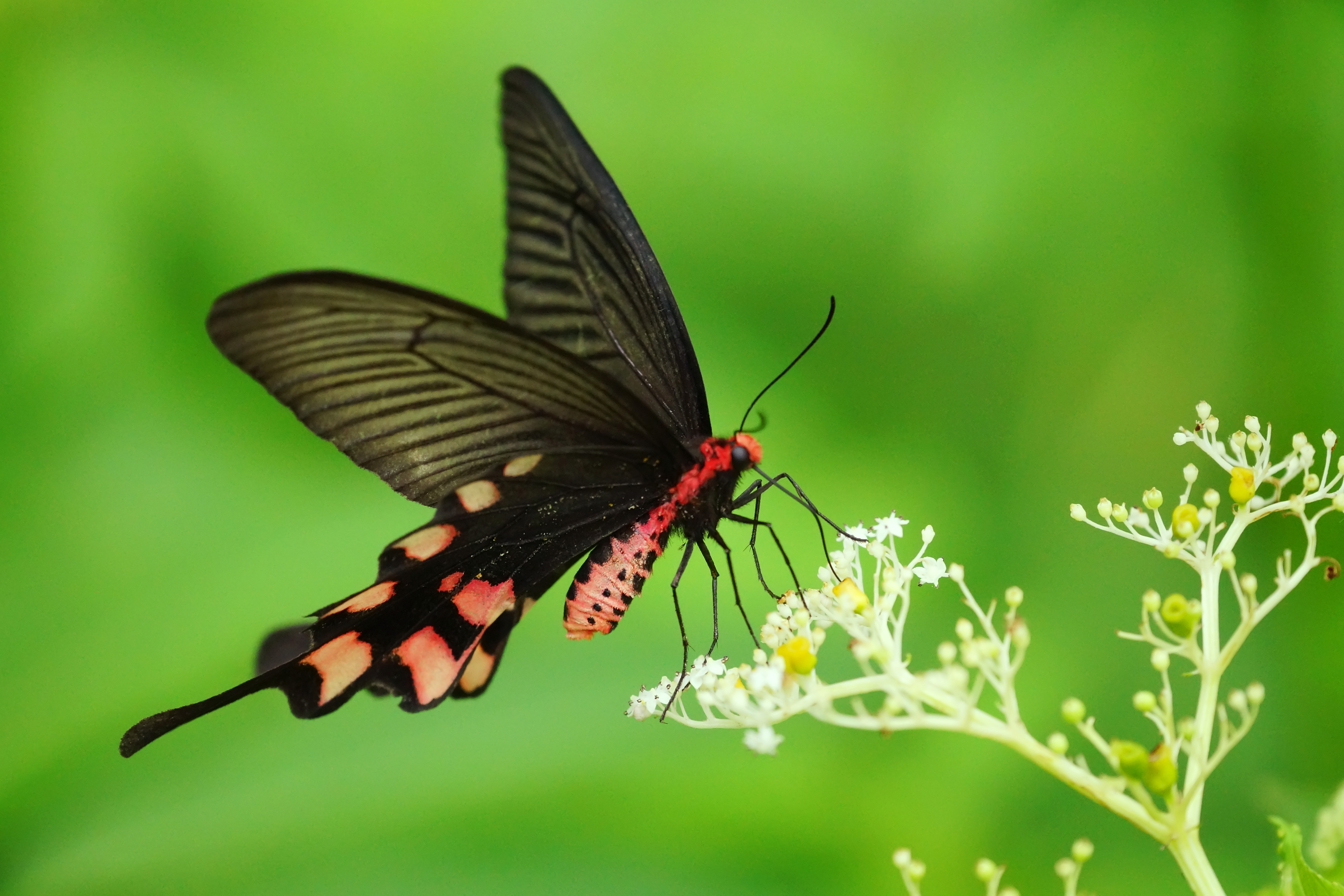

Scientific classification
- Kingdom: Animalia
- Phylum: Arthropoda
- Clade: Pancrustacea
- Class: Insecta
- Order: Lepidoptera
- Family: Papilionidae
- Genus: Byasa
- Species: B. impediens

Binomial name
- Byasa impediens (Seitz, 1907)

Synonyms
- Atrophaneura impediens (Rothschild, 1895)

= Byasa impediens =

Pink-spotted windmill

Species of butterfly

Byasa impediens, the pink-spotted windmill, is a species of butterfly from the family Papilionidae (swallowtails) found in Taiwan.

The wingspan is 10–11 cm. The wings are black and have large light pink spots. The underside of the wings are similar to the upside. The body is partially black with a covering of red hairs underneath.

The larva feeds on Aristolochia species.

== Status ==
No data on conservation status; more research needed. Subspecies B. i. febanus is sometimes accepted as a separate species.
