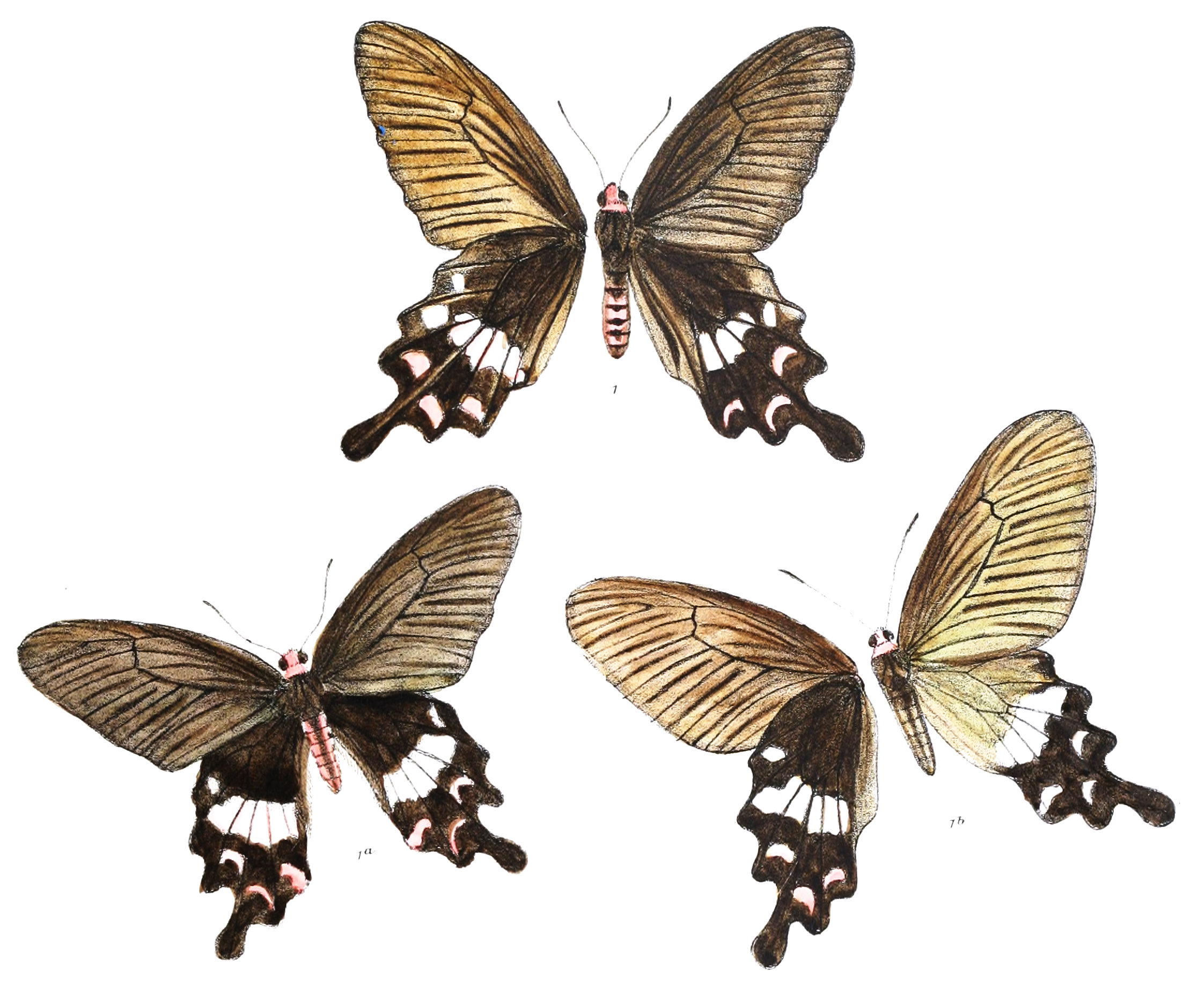

Scientific classification
- Kingdom: Animalia
- Phylum: Arthropoda
- Clade: Pancrustacea
- Class: Insecta
- Order: Lepidoptera
- Family: Papilionidae
- Genus: Byasa
- Species: B. adamsoni

Binomial name
- Byasa adamsoni (Grose-Smith, 1886)

Synonyms
- Papilio adamsoni Grose-Smith, 1886; Papilio (Byasa) minereoides Elwes & de Nicéville, [1887]; Atrophaneura (Byasa) adamsoni (Grose-Smith, 1886)

= Byasa adamsoni =

Species of butterfly

Byasa adamsoni, or Adamson's rose, is a species of butterfly from the family Papilionidae that is found in Burma, Thailand, Laos, Cambodia and Vietnam.

== Etymology ==
It is named for the collector Captain Adamson R.E.
