= Byasa daemonius =

Scientific classification
- Domain: Eukaryota
- Kingdom: Animalia
- Phylum: Arthropoda
- Class: Insecta
- Order: Lepidoptera
- Family: Papilionidae
- Genus: Byasa
- Species: B. daemonius

Binomial name
- Byasa daemonius (Alphéraky, 1895)

Synonyms
- Papilio daemonius Alphéraky, 1895; Atrophaneura daemonius (Alphéraky, 1895); Papilio alcinous plutonius ab. fatuus Rothschild, 1895; Papilio daemonius var. yunnana Oberthür, 1907

Species of butterfly

Byasa daemonius is a butterfly described by Sergei Alphéraky in 1895. It is found in Tibet and western China, that belongs to the windmills genus Byasa, comprising tailed black swallowtail butterflies with white spots and red submarginal crescents.

== Subspecies ==
- Byasa daemonius daemonius
- Byasa daemonius yunnana (Oberthür, 1907) (Yunnan)

== Status ==
Very little information is available and none on current status. Further research is required.
