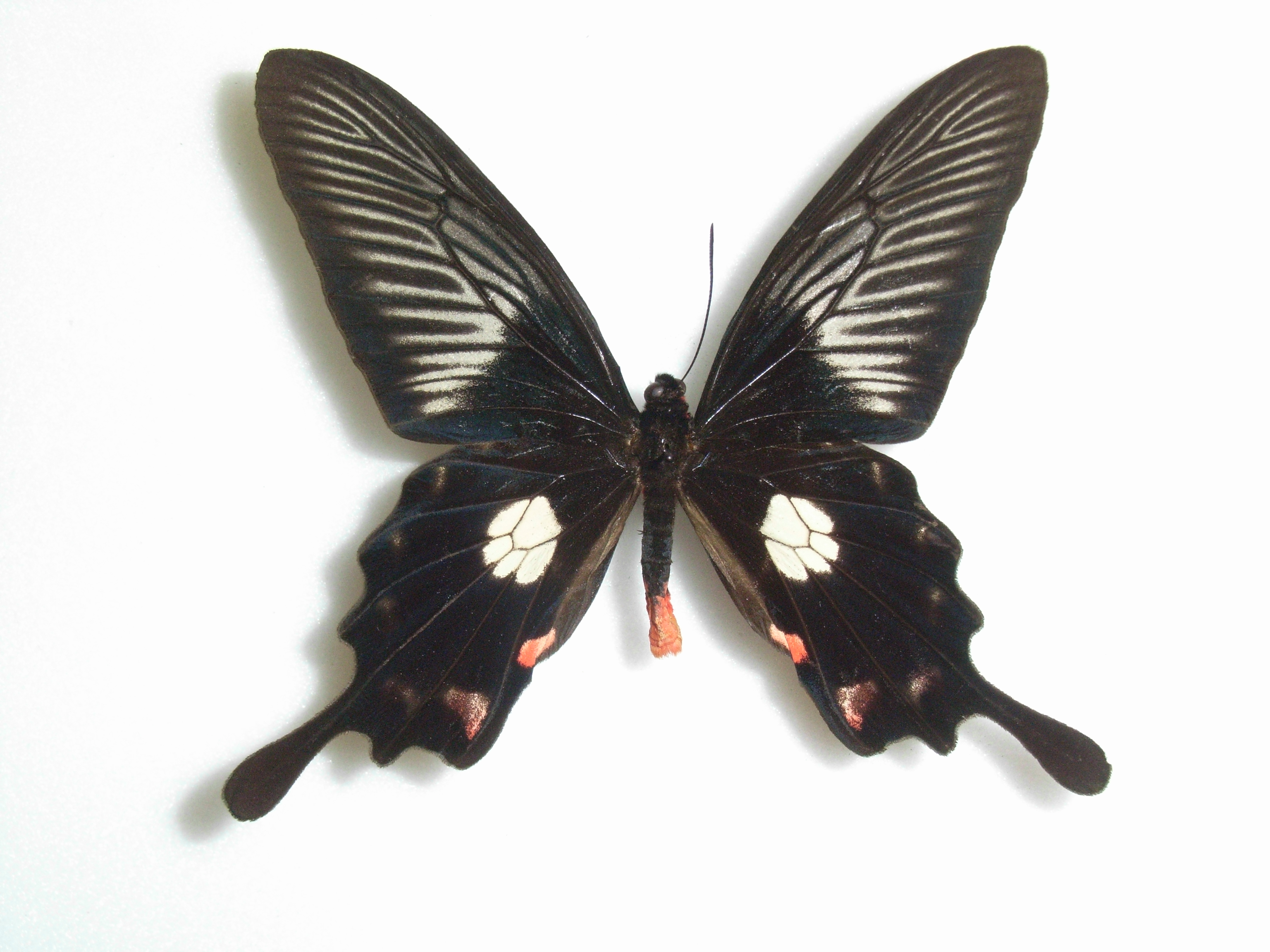

Scientific classification
- Kingdom: Animalia
- Phylum: Arthropoda
- Clade: Pancrustacea
- Class: Insecta
- Order: Lepidoptera
- Family: Papilionidae
- Genus: Pachliopta
- Species: P. mariae

Binomial name
- Pachliopta mariae Page & Treadaway, 2003

Synonyms
- Papilio mariae Semper, 1878; Papilio mariae Rothschild, 1895; Pachlioptera mariae; Atrophaneura mariae (Semper, 1878)

= Pachliopta mariae =

Species of butterfly

Pachliopta mariae is a species of butterfly from the family Papilionidae (the swallowtails) that is found in the Philippines.

The wingspan is 100–110 mm. The wings are generally black with red spots and white markings.

The larvae feed on Aristolochia species.

== Subspecies ==
- Pachliopta mariae mariae (Philippines: Bohol, Cebu, Leyte, Mindanao, Panaon, Samar)
- Pachliopta mariae almae (Semper, 1891) (Philippines: Luzon, Polillo)
- Pachliopta mariae camarines Schröder & Treadaway, 1978 (Philippines: Luzon)
