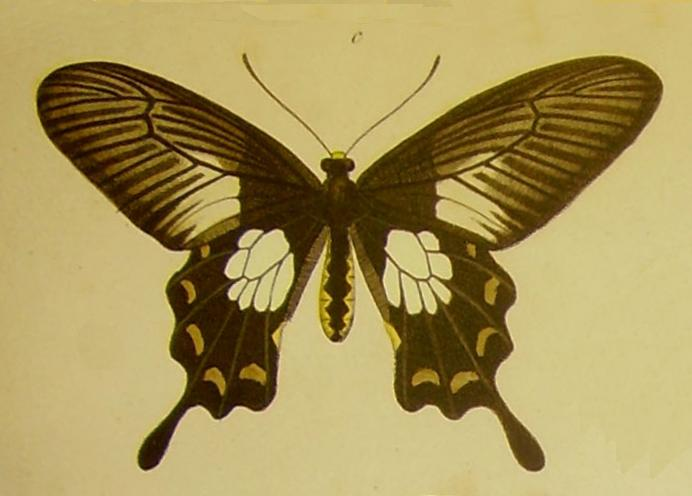

Scientific classification
- Kingdom: Animalia
- Phylum: Arthropoda
- Clade: Pancrustacea
- Class: Insecta
- Order: Lepidoptera
- Family: Papilionidae
- Genus: Pachliopta
- Species: P. phlegon

Binomial name
- Pachliopta phlegon (C. & R. Felder, 1864)

Synonyms
- Papilio phlegon C. & R. Felder, 1864; Papilio annae phlegon Rothschild, 1895; Pachliopta annae phlegon; Atrophaneura phlegon (C. & R. Felder, 1864)

= Pachliopta phlegon =

Species of butterfly

Pachliopta phlegon is a species of butterfly from the family Papilionidae (the swallowtails) that is found in the Philippines.

The larvae feed on Aristolochia species.
