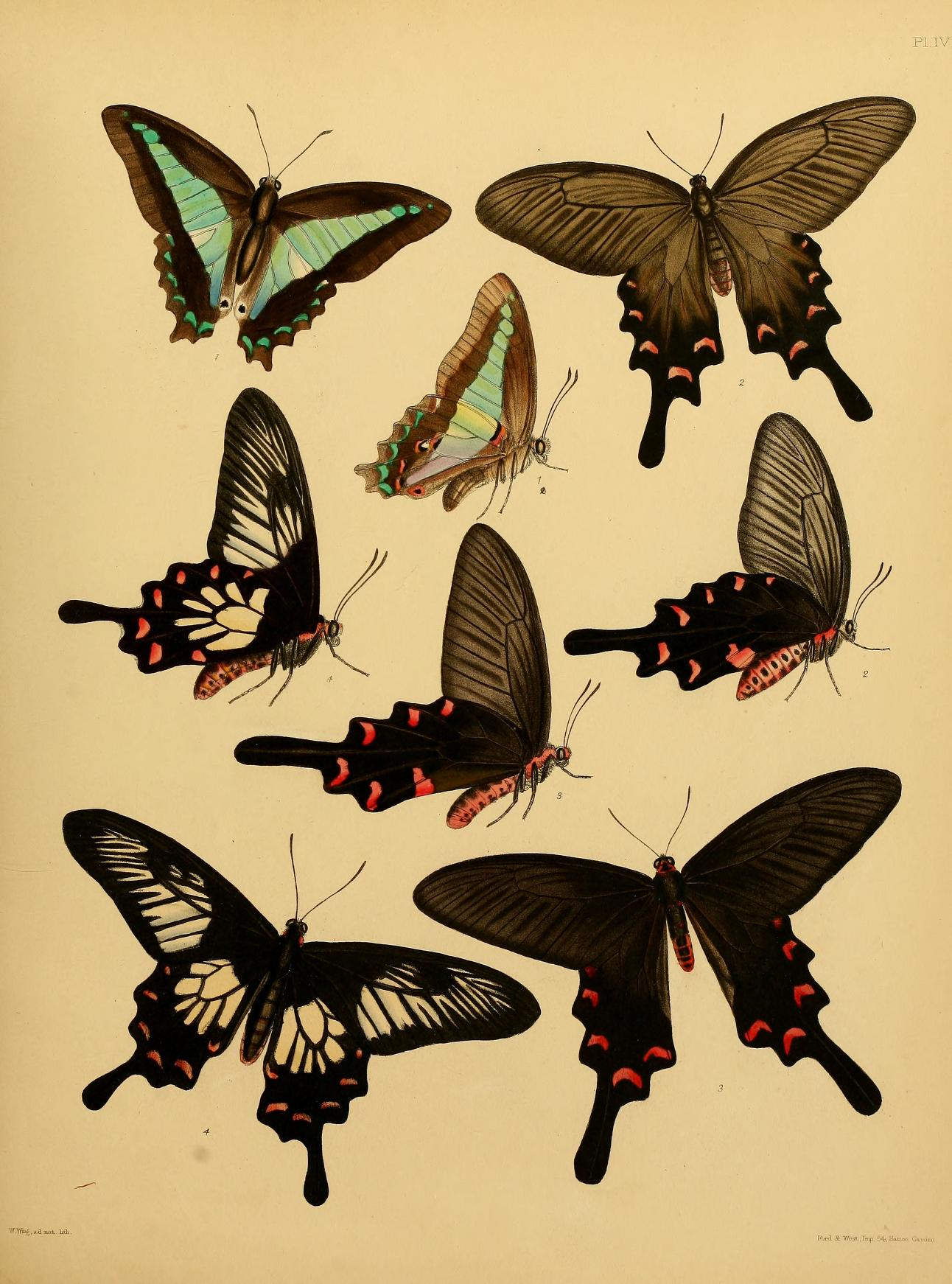

Scientific classification
- Kingdom: Animalia
- Phylum: Arthropoda
- Clade: Pancrustacea
- Class: Insecta
- Order: Lepidoptera
- Family: Papilionidae
- Genus: Byasa
- Species: B. mencius

Binomial name
- Byasa mencius (C. Felder & R. Felder, 1862)

Synonyms
- Papilio alcinous mencius Rothschild, 1895; Atrophaneura mencius (C. Felder & R. Felder, 1862)

= Byasa mencius =

Species of butterfly

Byasa mencius is a butterfly from the family Papilionidae (swallowtails). It is found in China. The species was first described by Cajetan Felder and Rudolf Felder in 1862.

The wingspan is 10–11 cm. The wings are dark brown with chain of large red spots on the hindwings. The underside of the body is covered in red hairs.

The larvae feed on Cocullus carolinus.

== Taxonomy ==
In the original description (C. Felder & R. Felder, 1862; Wien. ent. Monats. 6 (1): 22) Papilio mencius Nob. is stated to be "geographica mutatio" [synonym of] P. alcinous Klug var. apud. [George Robert] Gray, 1852 Catal. of Lep. Ins. I Plate 4 fig. 2, 3. shown here in the taxobox illustration.

In other words, the variety of Papilio alcinous figured by Gray was raised to a "good" (one accepted) species by C. Felder and R. Felder. Their specimens were from the Chinese coastal trading city of Ningpo.
