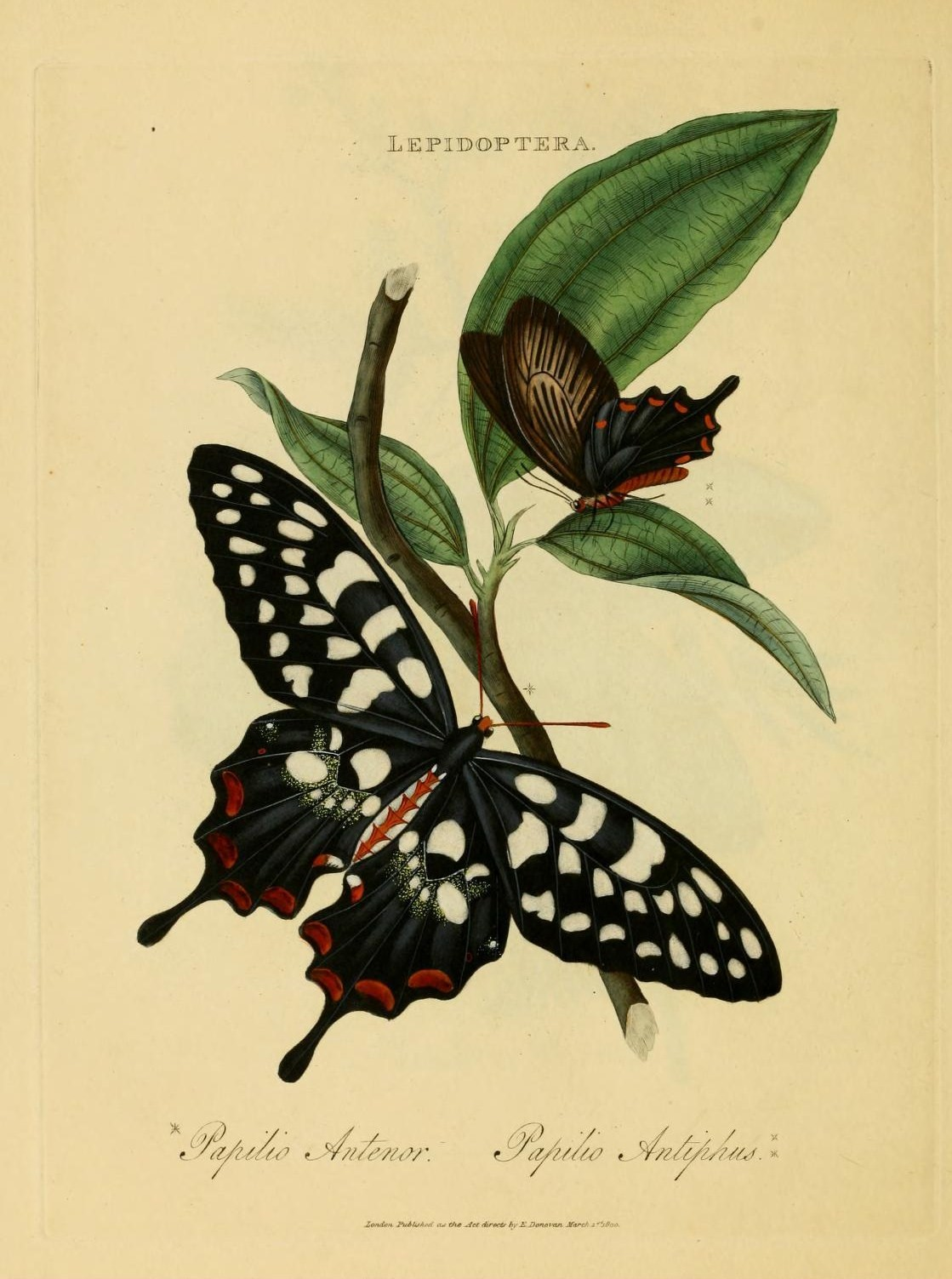
- Pachliopta antiphus top right

Scientific classification
- Kingdom: Animalia
- Phylum: Arthropoda
- Clade: Pancrustacea
- Class: Insecta
- Order: Lepidoptera
- Family: Papilionidae
- Genus: Pachliopta
- Species: P. antiphus

Binomial name
- Pachliopta antiphus Page & Treadaway, 2003

Synonyms
- Papilio antiphus Fabricius, 1793; Papilio aristolochiae antiphus Rothschild, 1895; Pachliopta aristolochiae antiphus; Atrophaneura antiphus (Fabricius, 1793); Papilio acuta Druce, 1873; Atrophaneura yoshikoae Okano, 1988

= Pachliopta antiphus =

Species of butterfly

Pachliopta antiphus is a species of butterfly from the family Papilionidae (swallowtails) that is found in Sumatra, Borneo and the Philippines.

The larvae feed on Aristolochia.

== Taxonomy ==
The taxonomic position of P. a. antiphus is uncertain. It is regarded as conspecific with Pachliopta aristolochiae by Tsukada and Nishiyama (1982) and Fujioka et al. but recognized as a separate species by Page & Treadaway (1995).

=== Subspecies ===
- P. a. antiphus
- P. a. acuta (Druce, 1873) – Philippines: Jolo, Mapun, Tawitawi, Sanga Sanga, Sibutu, Basilan
- P. a. brevicauda (Staudinger, 1889) – Philippines: Busuanga, Cuyo, Dumaran, Palawan
- P. a. elioti (Page & Treadaway, 1995) – Philippines: Siasi

The following subspecies are treated as junior synonyms of Pachliopta antiphus antiphus by Page & Treadaway (1995):

- Papilio aristolochiae poseidippus Fruhstorfer, 1911
- Papilio aristolochiae kameiros Fruhstorfer, 1911
