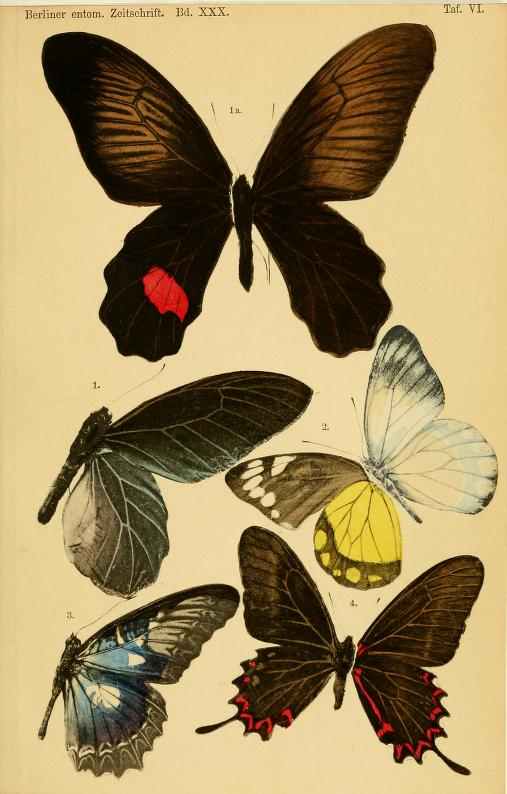
- Honrath's plate in Berliner entomologische Zeitschrift 1886, figure 1 female, 1a male

Scientific classification
- Kingdom: Animalia
- Phylum: Arthropoda
- Clade: Pancrustacea
- Class: Insecta
- Order: Lepidoptera
- Family: Papilionidae
- Genus: Atrophaneura
- Species: A. kuehni

Binomial name
- Atrophaneura kuehni (Honrath, 1886)

Synonyms
- Papilio kuehni Honrath, 1886; Papilio kühni Honrath, 1886; Papilio kühni Rothschild, 1895

= Atrophaneura kuehni =

Species of butterfly

Atrophaneura kuehni is a species of butterfly from the family Papilionidae. It is found on Sulawesi, Indonesia.

The male's dorsal side is black overall, the ventral side has a red patch. The female is brown with markings paler than the male.

Little is known about the status of this butterfly which may be very rare. It is held in very few museum collections.
