= Pachliopta phegeus =

Scientific classification
- Kingdom: Animalia
- Phylum: Arthropoda
- Clade: Pancrustacea
- Class: Insecta
- Order: Lepidoptera
- Family: Papilionidae
- Genus: Pachliopta
- Species: P. phegeus

Binomial name
- Pachliopta phegeus (Hopffer, 1866)

Synonyms
- Papilio phegeus Hopffer, 1866; Atrophaneura phegeus(Hopffer, 1866); Papilio phegeus Rothschild, 1895; Pachliopta phegeus leytensis Murayama, 1978; Pachliopta leytensis Murayama, 1978; Atrophaneura leytensis (Murayama, 1978); Pachliopta buraki Koçak, 1983

Species of butterfly

Pachliopta phegeus is a species of butterfly from the family Papilionidae that is found in the Philippines.

The species was originally described as Papilio phegeus Hopffer, 1866 with a later subspecies Pachliopta phegeus leytensis Murayama, 1978 However Koçak, 1983 suggested that the name phegeus could not be used, due to a claimed primary objective homonym with the older Papilio phegea Borkhausen, 1788. Some others then adopted Koçak's replacement name Pachliopta buraki Koçak, 1983. However, others instead adopted Pachliopta leytensis Murayama, 1978 instead, as the next oldest available name. The situation was then revised by Moonen, 2015 who clarified that there is no primary homonym issue, so returned use to the oldest name for the species in the revised combination Pachliopta phegeus (Hopffer, 1866)

The larvae feed on Aristolochia philippensis.
