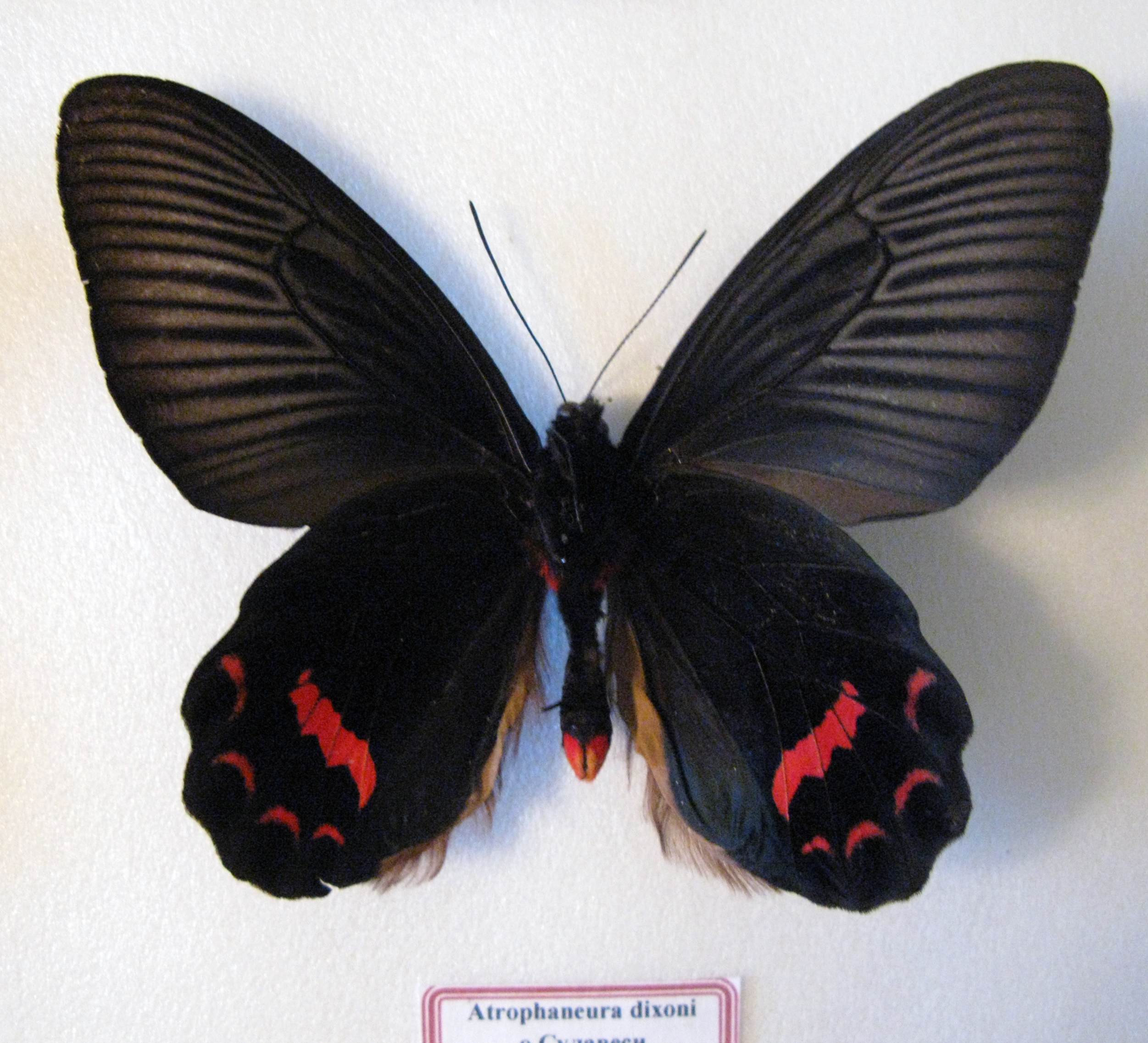

Scientific classification
- Kingdom: Animalia
- Phylum: Arthropoda
- Clade: Pancrustacea
- Class: Insecta
- Order: Lepidoptera
- Family: Papilionidae
- Genus: Atrophaneura
- Species: A. dixoni

Binomial name
- Atrophaneura dixoni (Grose-Smith, 1900)

Synonyms
- Papilio dixoni Grose-Smith, 1900

= Atrophaneura dixoni =

Species of butterfly

Atrophaneura dixoni, the Dixson's batwing is a species of butterfly from the family Papilionidae that is found in northern and central Sulawesi, Indonesia.

The wingspan is 130–150 mm. The wings are black. The underside of the hindwings have red patches which are more numerous in females than males. The wing veins are bordered in white.

== Status ==
Uncommon or rare. Localised.

== Etymology ==
This butterfly is named for the collector Frank Dixon who found it at an altitude of 800 feet (240 m) 30 miles (48 km) inland from Bwool.
