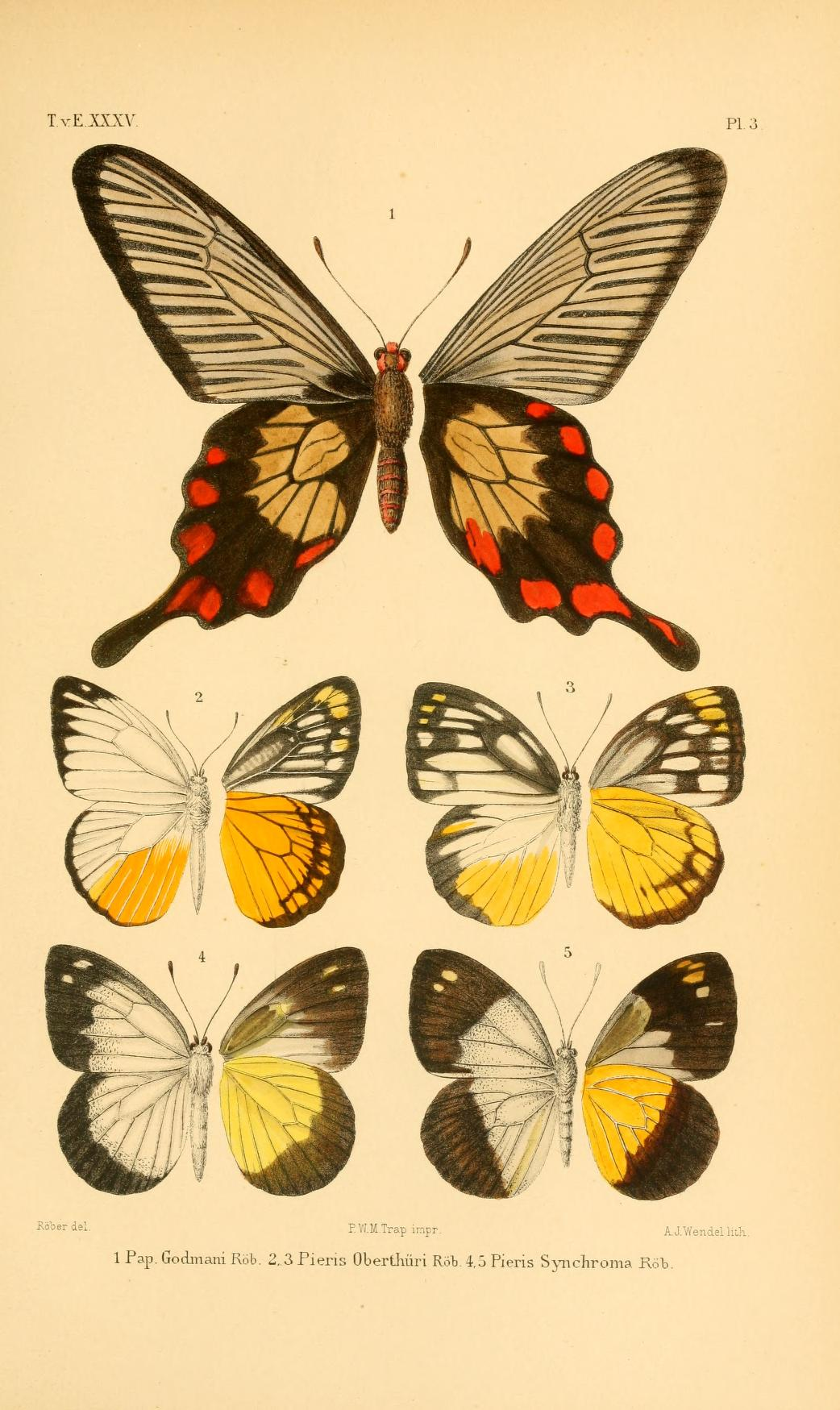

Scientific classification
- Kingdom: Animalia
- Phylum: Arthropoda
- Clade: Pancrustacea
- Class: Insecta
- Order: Lepidoptera
- Family: Papilionidae
- Genus: Pachliopta
- Species: P. oreon

Binomial name
- Pachliopta oreon (Doherty, 1891)

Synonyms
- Papilio (Menelaides) oreon Doherty, 1891; Papilio godmani Röber, 1891; Papilio oreon Rothschild, 1895; Atrophaneura oreon (Doherty, 1891)

= Pachliopta oreon =

Species of butterfly

Pachliopta oreon is a species of butterfly from the family Papilionidae. It is found only on the Lesser Sunda Islands.

The wingspan is 100–110 mm. The wings are dark-brown. There are red spots and a white markings on the wings.
