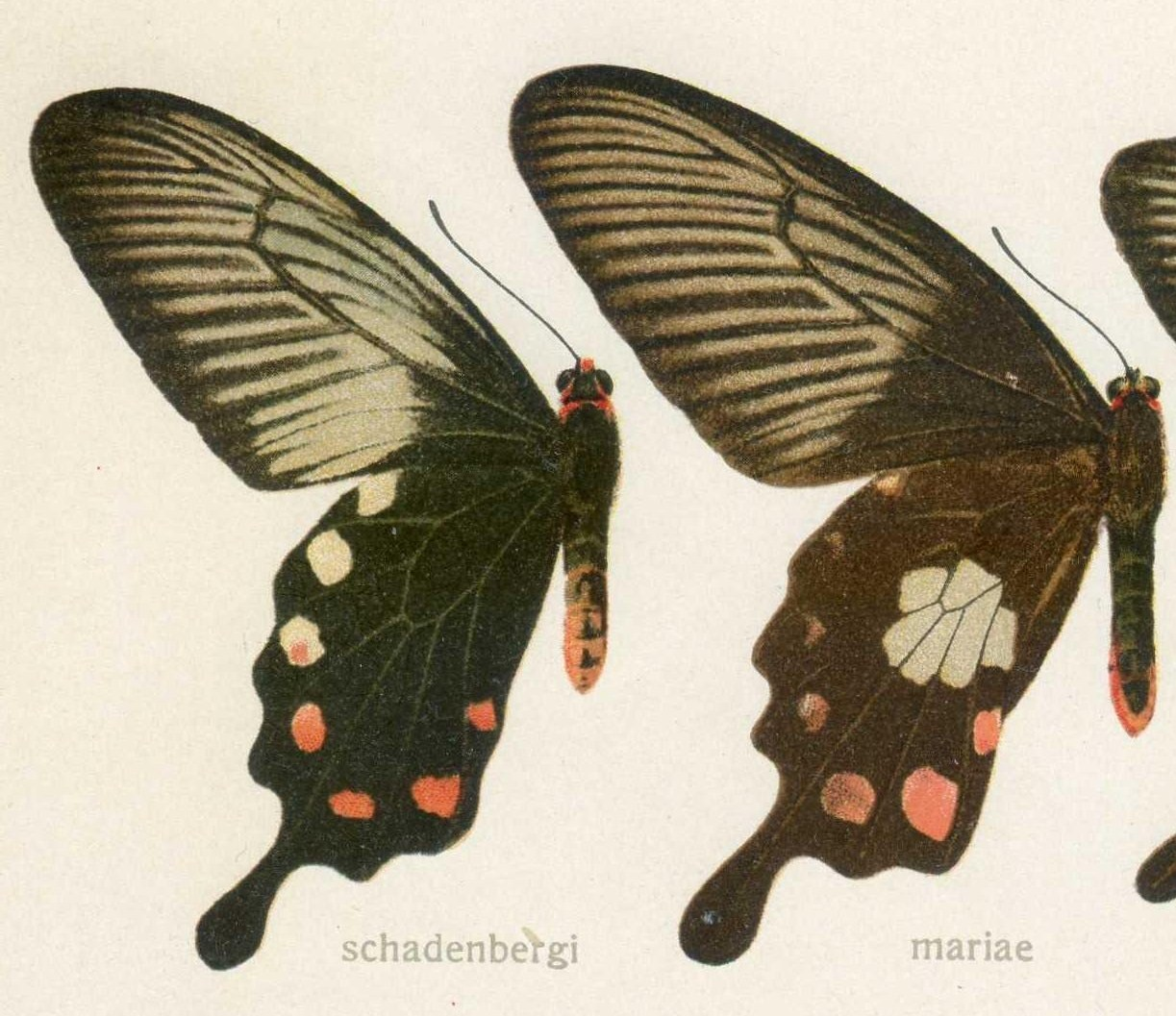
- Pachliopta schadenbergi on the left

Conservation status
- Least Concern (IUCN 3.1)

Scientific classification
- Kingdom: Animalia
- Phylum: Arthropoda
- Clade: Pancrustacea
- Class: Insecta
- Order: Lepidoptera
- Family: Papilionidae
- Genus: Pachliopta
- Species: P. schadenbergi

Binomial name
- Pachliopta schadenbergi (Semper, 1891)

Synonyms
- Papilio schadenbergi Semper, 1891; Atrophaneura schadenbergi (Semper, 1891)

= Pachliopta schadenbergi =

Species of butterfly

Pachliopta schadenbergi is a species of butterfly in the family Papilionidae. It is endemic to the Philippines and considered Least-concern in conservation assessment for the IUCN Red List of Threatened Species, but older listings have it as Vulnerable. Previously, this species has been referred to as Atrophaneura schadenbergi but originally was described under the name Papilio schadenbergi Semper, 1891.
