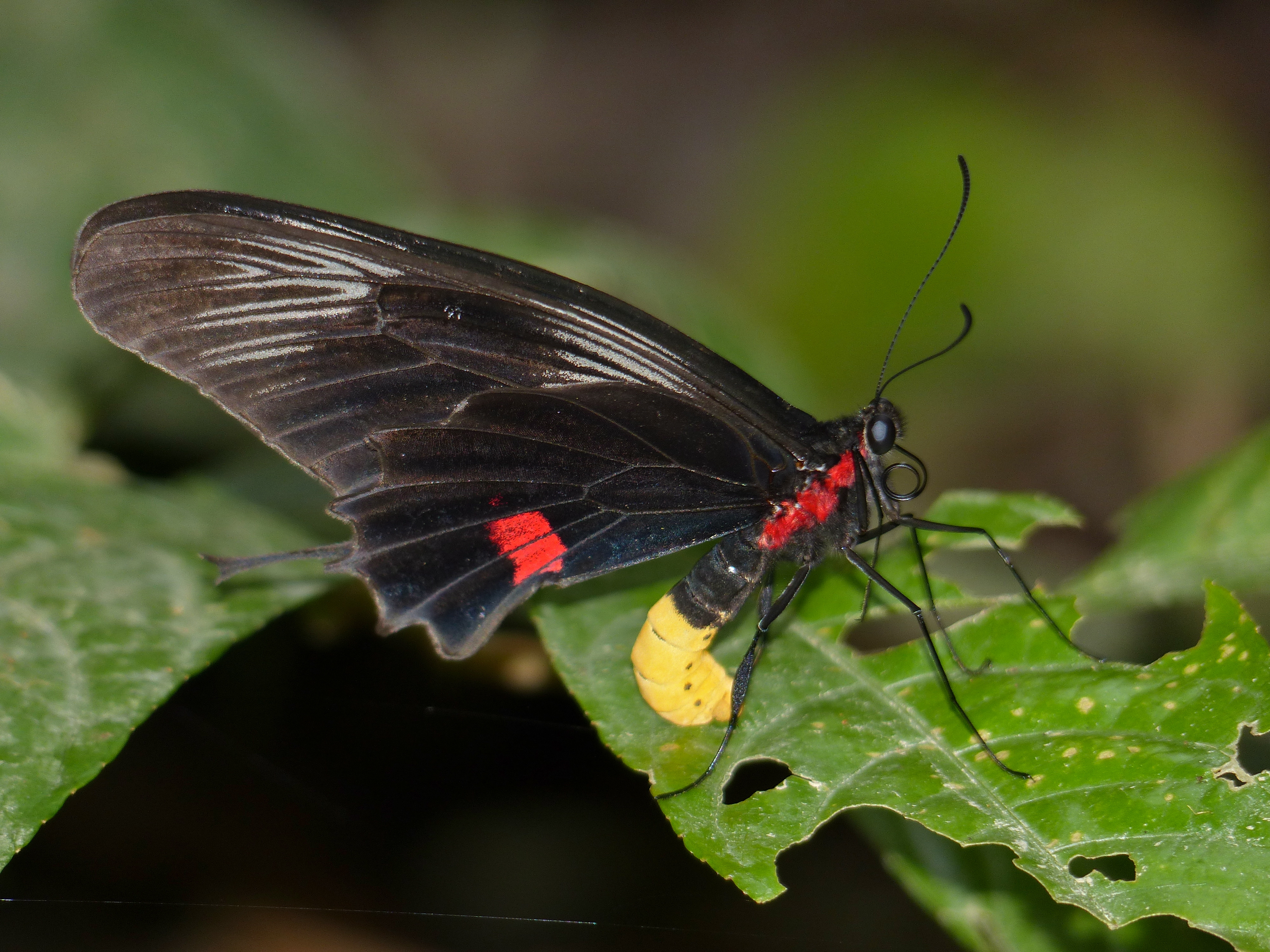

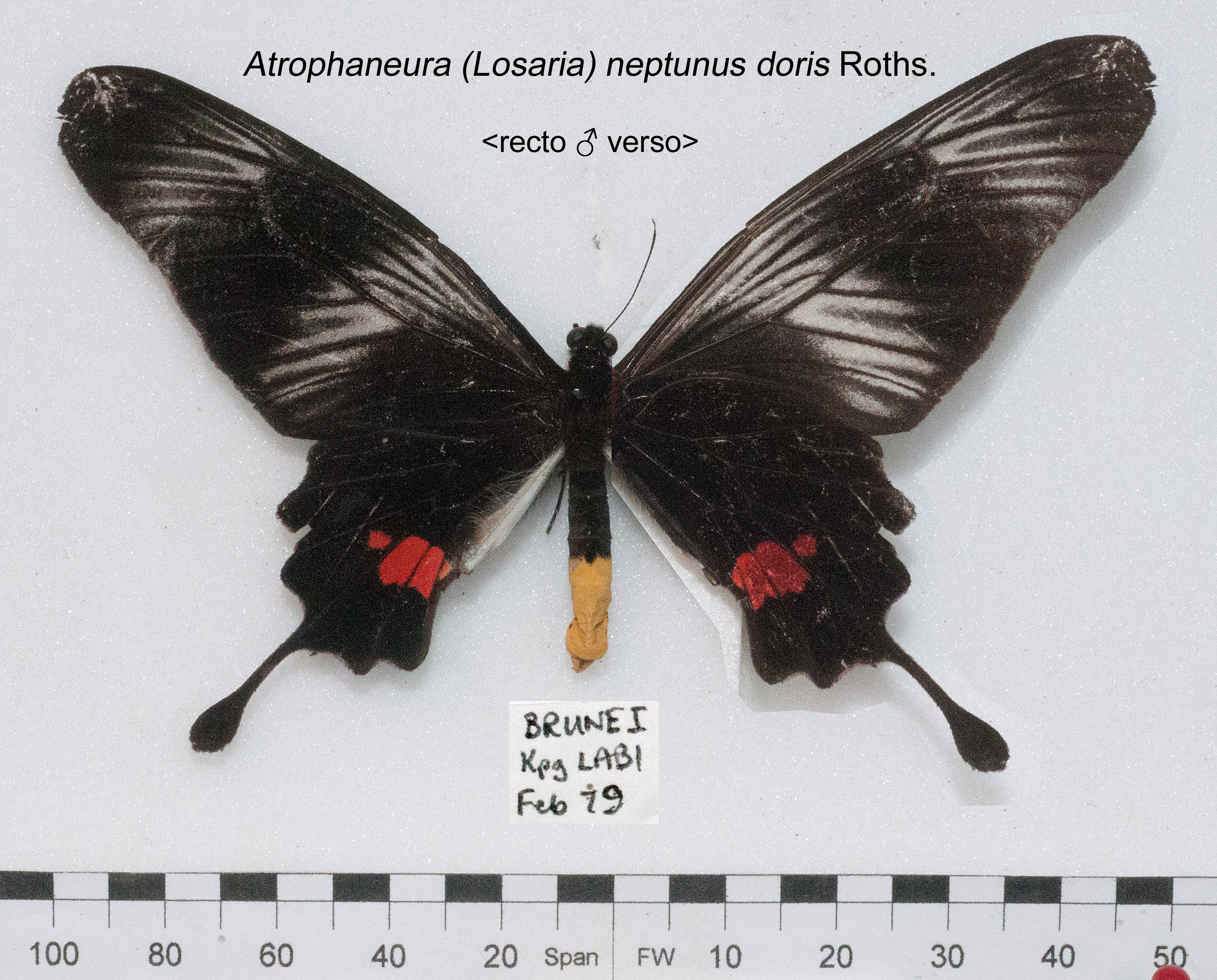
- L. n. doris

Scientific classification
- Kingdom: Animalia
- Phylum: Arthropoda
- Clade: Pancrustacea
- Class: Insecta
- Order: Lepidoptera
- Family: Papilionidae
- Genus: Losaria
- Species: L. neptunus

Binomial name
- Losaria neptunus (Guérin-Méneville, 1840)

Synonyms
- Papilio neptunus Guérin-Méneville, 1840; Atrophaneura neptunus Rothschild, 1895; Parides neptunus; Balignina neptunus Page & Treadaway, 2003; Papilio thetys Guenée, 1878; Papilio thetys Guenée, 1878; Papilio neptunus var. fehri Honrath, 1892; Papilio neptunus fehri Rothschild, 1895; Pachliopta neptunus dacasini Schröder, 1976; Balignina neptunus dacasini Page & Treadaway, 2003; Balignina neptunus matbai Page & Treadaway, 2003

= Losaria neptunus =

Species of butterfly

Losaria neptunus, the yellow-bodied club-tail or yellow club-tail, is a species of butterfly from the family Papilionidae that is found in Sumatra, south Burma, north Borneo and the Philippines

The wingspan is 100–120 mm (3.9–4.7 in). The wings are dark brown or black. The lower half of the abdomen is yellow. It has white markings on the forewings and a red patch on each hindwing.

The larvae feed on Thottea and Aristolochia species.

== Subspecies ==
- L. n. manasukkiti (Cotton, Racheli and Sukhumalind, 2005) - Ranong and southernmost Myanmar
- L. n. neptunus (Guérin-Méneville, 1840) - West Malaysia, southernmost Thailand
- L. n. creber (van Eecke, 1914) - Simeulue
- L. n. fehri (Honrath, 1892) - Nias
- L. n. lepida (Hanafusa, 1994) - Tanahmasa Island in the Batu Islands
- L. n. eminens (Hanafusa, 1990) - Sipora
- L. n. siborangitana (Tsukada and Nishiyama, 1980) - Northern Sumatra
- L. n. padanganus (Rothschild, 1908) - Western Sumatra
- L. n. doris (Rothschild, 1908) - Borneo
- L. n. dacasini (Schröder, 1976) - Palawan
- L. n. matbai (Schröder & Treadaway, 1990) - Tawi-Tawi
