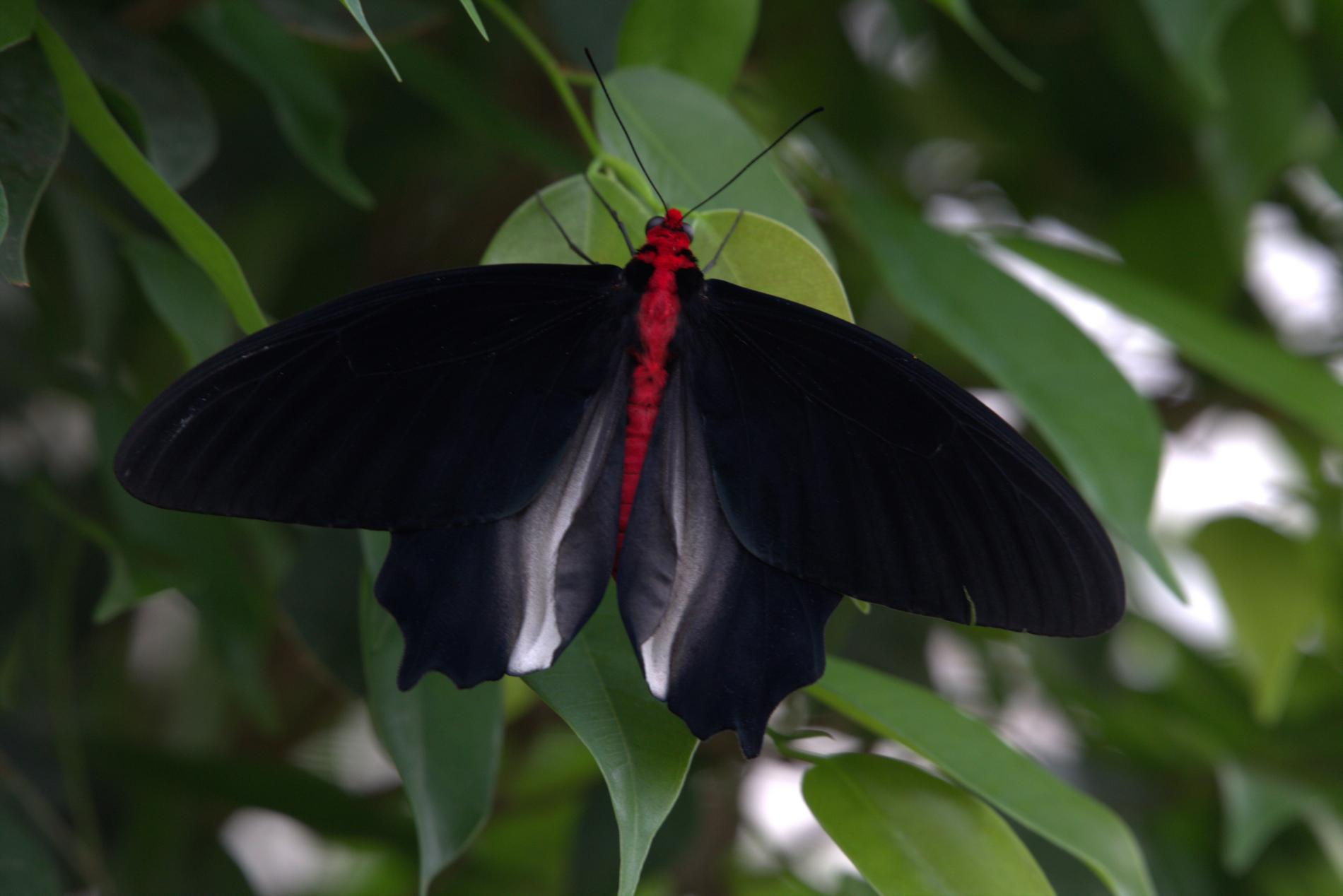
- Male, Both photos
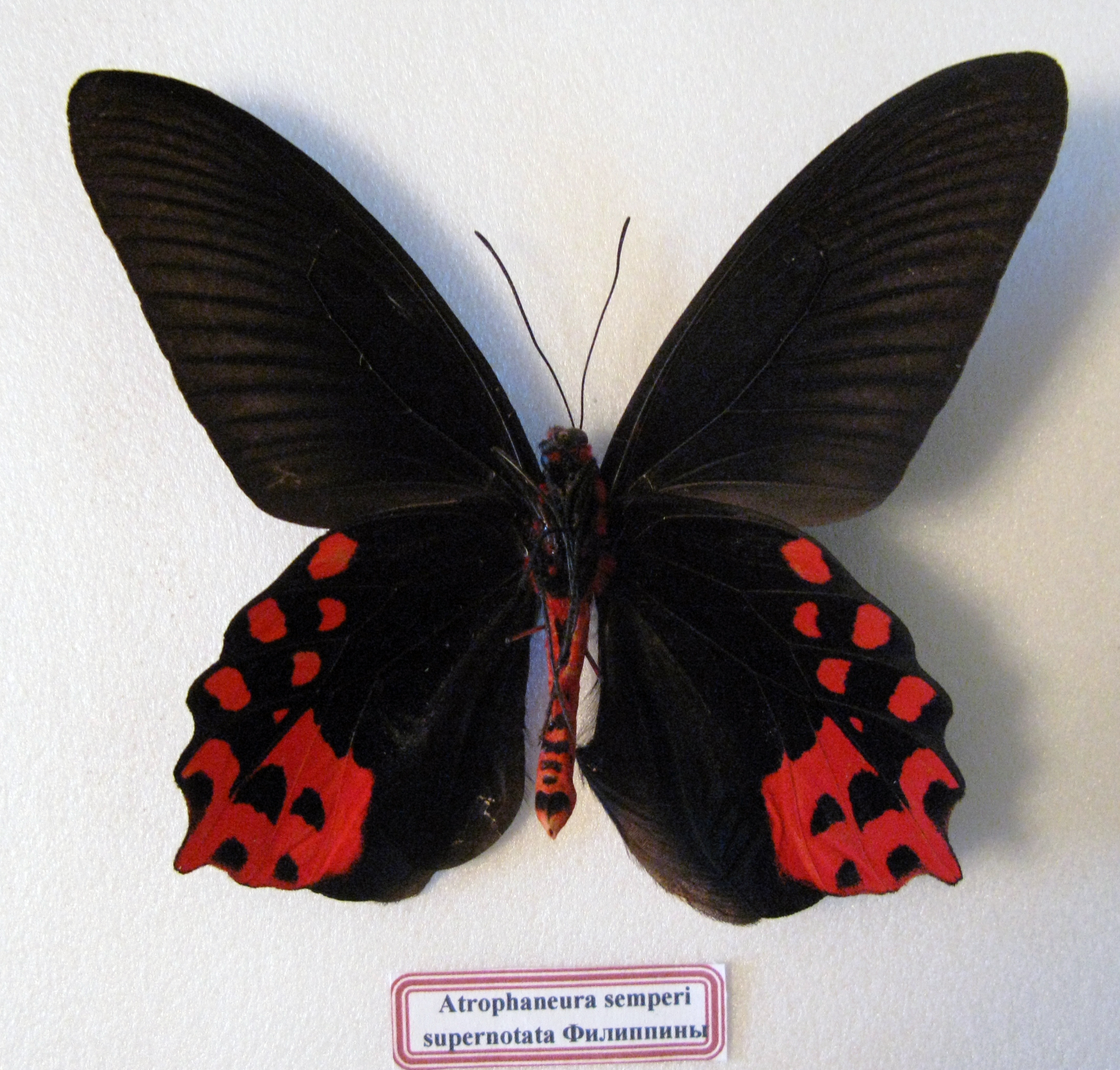

Scientific classification
- Kingdom: Animalia
- Phylum: Arthropoda
- Clade: Pancrustacea
- Class: Insecta
- Order: Lepidoptera
- Family: Papilionidae
- Genus: Atrophaneura
- Species: A. semperi

Binomial name
- Atrophaneura semperi (C. & R. Felder, 1861)

Synonyms
- Papilio semperi C. & R. Felder, 1861; Atrophaneura erythrosoma Reakirt, [1865]; Papilio semperi Rothschild, 1895; Papilio aphthonia Rothschild, 1908; Papilio baglantis Rothschild, 1908

= Atrophaneura semperi =

Species of butterfly

Atrophaneura semperi is a species of butterfly from the family Papilionidae that is found in Indonesia, Malaysia, and the Philippines. It is the type species for the genus.

The wingspan is 12–15 cm. The wings are black. The body has red hairs. The underside of the hindwings contain some red markings. Females are dark brown with light pink markings on the upside of the wings.

The larvae feed on Aristolochia species.

== Subspecies ==
- Atrophaneura semperi albofasciata (Semper, 1892) – Philippines (Mindoro)
- Atrophaneura semperi aphthonia (Rothschild, 1908) – Philippines (Camiguin de Mindanao, Dinagar, Mindanao, Siargao)
- Atrophaneura semperi baglantis (Rothschild, 1908) – Philippines (Negros)
- Atrophaneura semperi imogene Schröder & Treadaway, 1979 – Philippines (Sibuyan)
- Atrophaneura semperi justini Page & Treadaway, 2003 – Philippines (Masbate)
- Atrophaneura semperi lizae Schröder & Treadaway, 1984 – Philippines (Panay)
- Atrophaneura semperi melanotus (Staudinger, 1889) – Philippines (Palawan, Calamian group)
- Atrophaneura semperi semperi (C. Felder & R. Felder, 1861) – Philippines (Camiguin de Luzon, Polillo)
- Atrophaneura semperi sorsogona Page & Treadaway, 1996 – Philippines (Luzon)
- Atrophaneura semperi supernotatus (Rothschild, 1895) – Philippines (Bohol, Cebu, Leyte, Panaon, Samar)

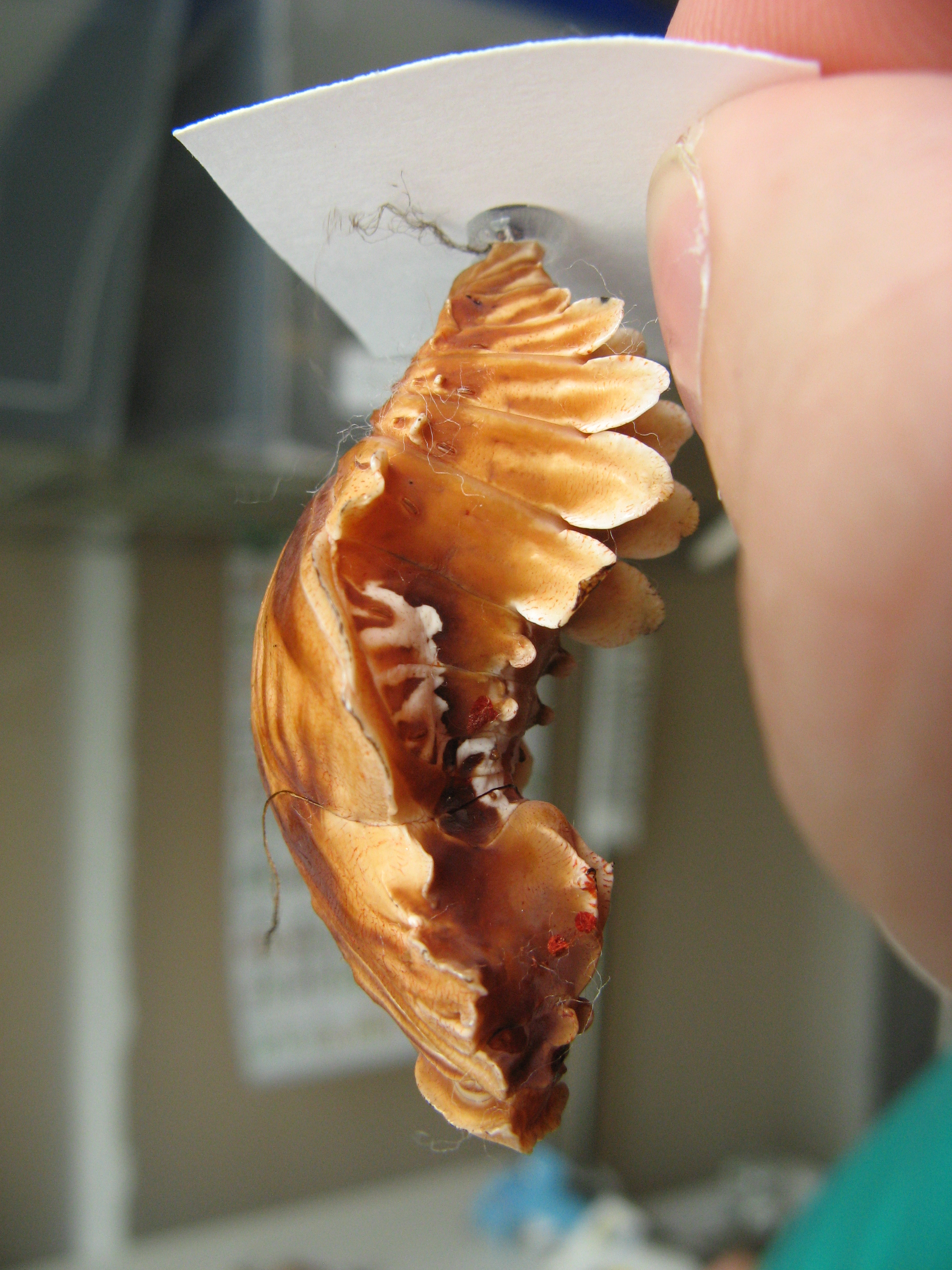
Pupa

== See also ==
- Ecoregions in the Philippines
