= Byasa hedistus =

Scientific classification
- Kingdom: Animalia
- Phylum: Arthropoda
- Clade: Pancrustacea
- Class: Insecta
- Order: Lepidoptera
- Family: Papilionidae
- Genus: Byasa
- Species: B. hedistus

Binomial name
- Byasa hedistus (Jordan, 1928)

Synonyms
- Atrophaneura dasarada hedistus; Atrophaneura hedistus

Species of butterfly

Byasa hedistus is a species of butterfly from the family Papilionidae (swallowtails) that is found in northern Vietnam and southern China.

Byasa hedistus is little known, with no information available on status. it is regarded by Bernard d'Abrera as a subspecies of Byasa dasarada.
