= Pachliopta adamas =

Scientific classification
- Domain: Eukaryota
- Kingdom: Animalia
- Phylum: Arthropoda
- Class: Insecta
- Order: Lepidoptera
- Family: Papilionidae
- Genus: Pachliopta
- Species: P. adamas

Binomial name
- Pachliopta adamas (Zinken, 1831)

Synonyms
- Papilio adamas Zinken, 1831; Pachliopta aristolochiae adamas; Atrophaneura aristolochiae adamas; Atrophaneura adamas

Species of butterfly

Pachliopta adamas is a swallowtail butterfly belonging to the genus Pachliopta, the roses, or red-bodied swallowtails. It is found in Bawan, Java, and Enggano.

== Subspecies ==
- Pachliopta adamas adamas
- Pachliopta adamas agricola Tsukada & Nishiyama, 1980 (Tanahjampea)

== Taxonomy ==
Sometimes treated as a subspecies of Pachliopta aristolochiae.
