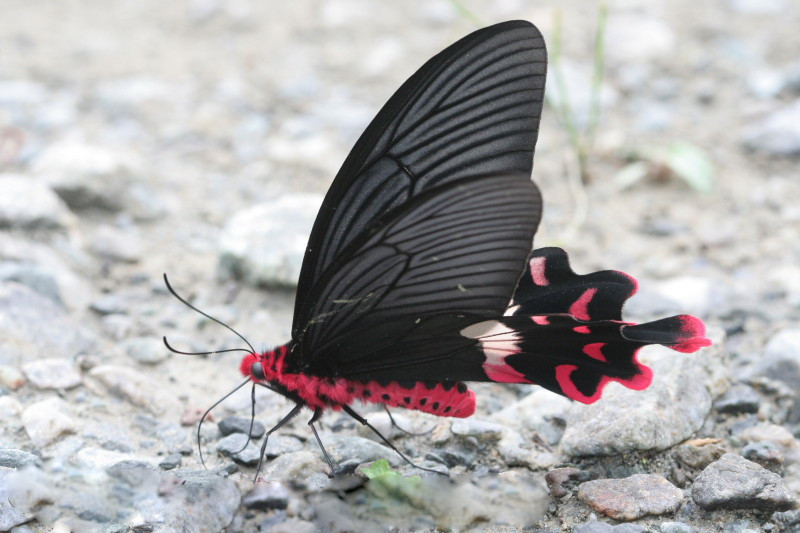

Scientific classification
- Kingdom: Animalia
- Phylum: Arthropoda
- Class: Insecta
- Order: Lepidoptera
- Family: Papilionidae
- Genus: Byasa
- Species: B. latreillei

Binomial name
- Byasa latreillei (Donovan, 1826)

= Byasa latreillei =

Rose windmill

Species of butterfly

Byasa latreillei, the rose windmill, is a butterfly from the windmills genus (Byasa), found in various parts of Asia, comprising tailed black swallowtail butterflies with white spots and red submarginal crescents.

== Description ==
- Wingspan: 110–130 mm.
- Sexes generally alike. Tailed, with red tips.
- Above, dull brownish-black.
- Hindwing has a white discal band consisting of elongated spots in veins 2, 3 and 4.
- The female has an additional small spot in vein 5 and only halfway to vein 6.
- It also has a series of lunules in veins 2 to 5 along the margin. The lunules in veins 2 to 4 are rose coloured while the lunule in vein 5 is white.
- The male has a white scent wool brand in a dorsal fold. (Wynter-Blyth).
- The male can be said to resemble the common rose, and, the female, the common Mormon form stichius. (Haribal).

Male upperside dull brownish black. Forewing with streaks in cell, the internervular streaks and the veins velvety black. Hindwing: ground colour more uniform to apex of cell, beyond this interspaces 2, 3 and 4 with broad elongate white spots, the spot in interspace 2 slightly tinged outwardly with crimson; sometimes a white crimson-tinted spot also in interspace 1; a subterminal series of crimson lunules in interspaces 2 to 5, that in 5 generally more or less white; lastly, a crimson spot at apex of vein 3 and on apex of tail. Underside similar, ground colour much paler; markings of the hindwing as on the upperside, but slightly larger, the crimson spots brighter; in many specimens a small discal adnervular spot in interspace 5, and a sub-terminal small white lunule in interspace 6 also present; the crimson-tinted discal spot in interspace 1 always present. Antennae dark brownish black, head and front of the prothorax crimson, the rest of the body above black; beneath, the palpi, thorax and abdomen crimson, the middle of the thorax and of the abdomen with black markings.

Female similar, slightly paler; the white and crimson markings on the hindwing on both upper and undersides similar but larger; there is generally also a discal adnervular spot in interspace 5. Antennae, head, thorax and abdomen as in the male.

== Life history ==
- Egg - not described.
- Caterpillar - The larva is brownish to pale purple in colour. The larva has a shiny black head and a white obliquely-placed band on segments seven and eight. It has a large number of tubercles. The first six segments of the larva have one pair of tubercles; the seventh to tenth segments have three pairs each; the eleventh to thirteen segments each have two pairs of short tubercles. The tubercles are purple, have red tips and streaks on the base.
- The pupa is reddish orange in colour and relatively broad in shape. It is attached by a body band. The pupa emits a squeak when touched.

== Habits ==
- It flies in May and June. It flies between 7,000 and 9,000 feet (2,100 and 2,700 m) in Garhwal (near Mussoorie) and between 5,000 and 6,000 feet (1,500 and 1,800 m) further east at Chungthang, north Sikkim in the Teesta valley.
- The host plants include Nepenthes species.

== Range ==
Afghanistan, Pakistan, northern India, Nepal, Bhutan, northern Myanmar, southern China and northern Vietnam.

In India, it is found in the states of Uttarakhand, Sikkim, Assam, Meghalaya, Nagaland and Manipur.

== Status ==
It is not rare and not regarded as threatened. Subspecies A. l. kabrua is protected by law in India. Requires more information.

== Taxonomy ==
Three subspecies are described of which the following two occur in India:

- B. l. latreillei Donovan Garhwal to Sikkim - not rare
- B. l. kabrua Tytler Assam to northern Myanmar - not rare

== Etymology ==
The specific epithet honours the French entomologist Pierre André Latreille.

== See also ==
- Lepidoptera
- Papilionidae
- List of butterflies of India (Papilionidae)
