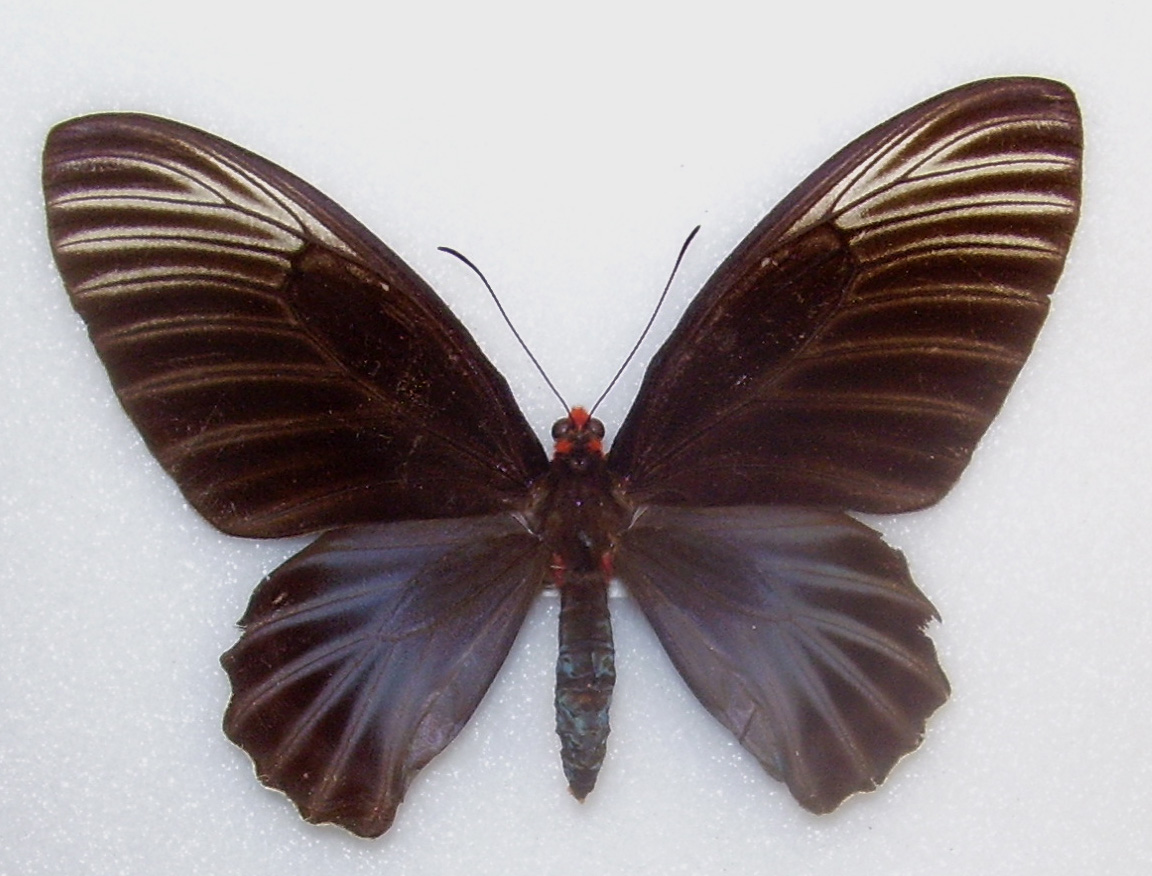

Scientific classification
- Domain: Eukaryota
- Kingdom: Animalia
- Phylum: Arthropoda
- Class: Insecta
- Order: Lepidoptera
- Family: Papilionidae
- Genus: Atrophaneura
- Species: A. nox

Binomial name
- Atrophaneura nox Swainson, 1822

Synonyms
- Papilio nox Swainson, 1822; Papilio memercus Godart, [1824]; Papilio neesius Zinken, 1831; Papilio noctis Hewitson, 1859; Papilio erebus Wallace, 1865; Papilio noctula Westwood, 1872; Papilio strix Westwood, 1872; Papilio (Pangerana) nyx de Nicéville, 1897; Papilio noctis henricus Fruhstorfer, 1899; Papilio nox banjermasinus Fruhstorfer, 1899; Papilio noctis solokanus Fruhstorfer, 1903; Papilio nox niepeltiana Strand, 1914; Papilio erebus petronius Fruhstorfer, 1901; Papilio nox smedleyi Jordan, 1937; Atrophaneura tungensis Zin & Leow, 1982

= Atrophaneura nox =

Malayan batwing

Species of butterfly

Atrophaneura nox, the Malayan batwing, is a papilionid butterfly found in Java, northern Borneo and Peninsular Malaysia.

== Description ==
The species is black with blue metallic reflections. On the forewings the veins are shaded white. There are red hairs on the thorax. The wingspan is 9–11 cm. Females are larger than males.

== Subspecies ==
- A. n. nox Java
- A. n. noctis (Hewitson, 1859) north Borneo
- A. n. erebus (Wallace, 1865) Peninsular Malaya
- A. n. noctula (Westwood, 1872) north Borneo
- A. n. nyx (de Nicéville, 1897) Bali
- A. n. henricus (Fruhstorfer, 1899) north east Sumatra
- A. n. banjermasinus (Fruhstorfer, 1899) south Borneo
- A. n. solokanus (Fruhstorfer, 1903) south Sumatra
- A. n. niepeltiana (Strand, 1914) Sumatra
- A. n. petronius (Fruhstorfer, 1901) Nias
- A. n. smedleyi (Jordan, 1937) Mentaway Island
- A. n. tungensis Zin & Leow, 1982 Sumatra
- A. n. mirifica Hanafusa, 1994 Batu Island
- A. n. hirokoae Hirata & Miyagawa, 2006 Tuangku Island
- A. n. miekoae Hirata & Miyagawa, 2006 Singkep

== Status ==
A widespread but local species in forest localities. It is extinct in Singapore.
