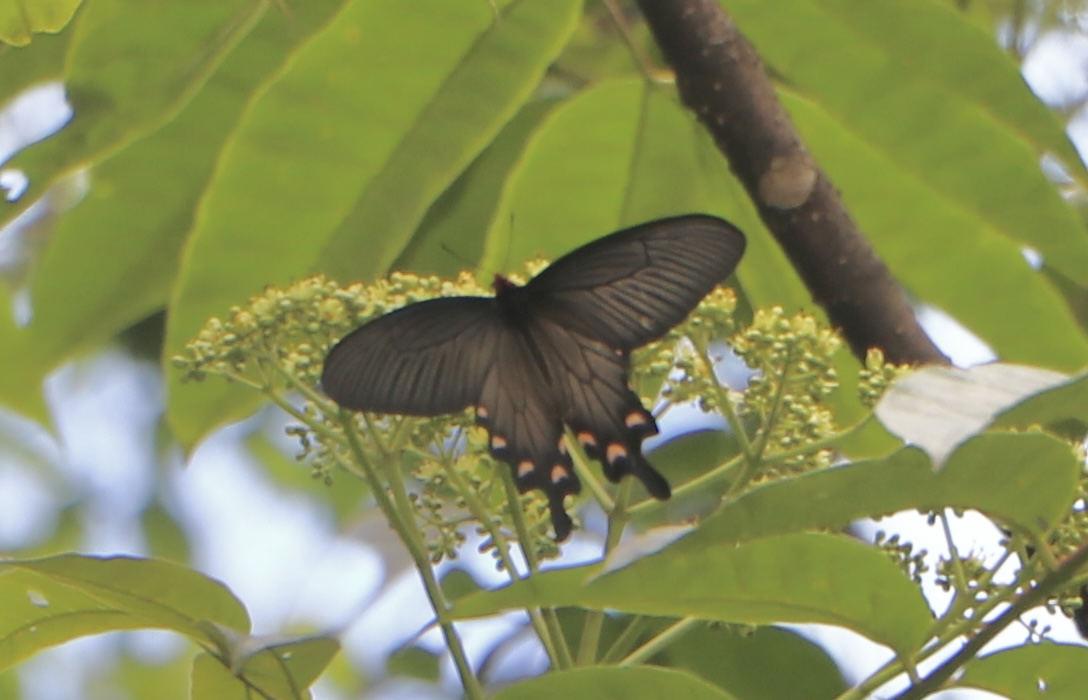
- Subspecies A. p. pembertoni

Scientific classification
- Kingdom: Animalia
- Phylum: Arthropoda
- Class: Insecta
- Order: Lepidoptera
- Family: Papilionidae
- Genus: Byasa
- Species: B. plutonius

Binomial name
- Byasa plutonius Oberthür, 1907

Synonyms
- Atrophaneura plutonius

= Byasa plutonius =

Chinese windmill

Species of butterfly

Byasa plutonius, the Chinese windmill, is a butterfly found in Asia that belongs to the windmills genus (Byasa), comprising tailed black swallowtail butterflies with white spots and red submarginal crescents.

The two subspecies in the Indian subcontinent have the common names of Pemberton's windmill and Tytler's windmill.

== Range ==
This butterfly lives in south-western China, Bhutan, Nepal and north-east India.

In India, it is found in the states of Sikkim, Assam, Manipur, Nagaland and Mizoram.

== Status ==
A rare species of high elevations, two subspecies are protected in India:

- B. p. pembertoni, Pemberton's Chinese windmill (may be contracted to Pemberton's windmill)
- B. p. tytleri, Tytler's Chinese windmill (may be contracted to Tytler's windmill)
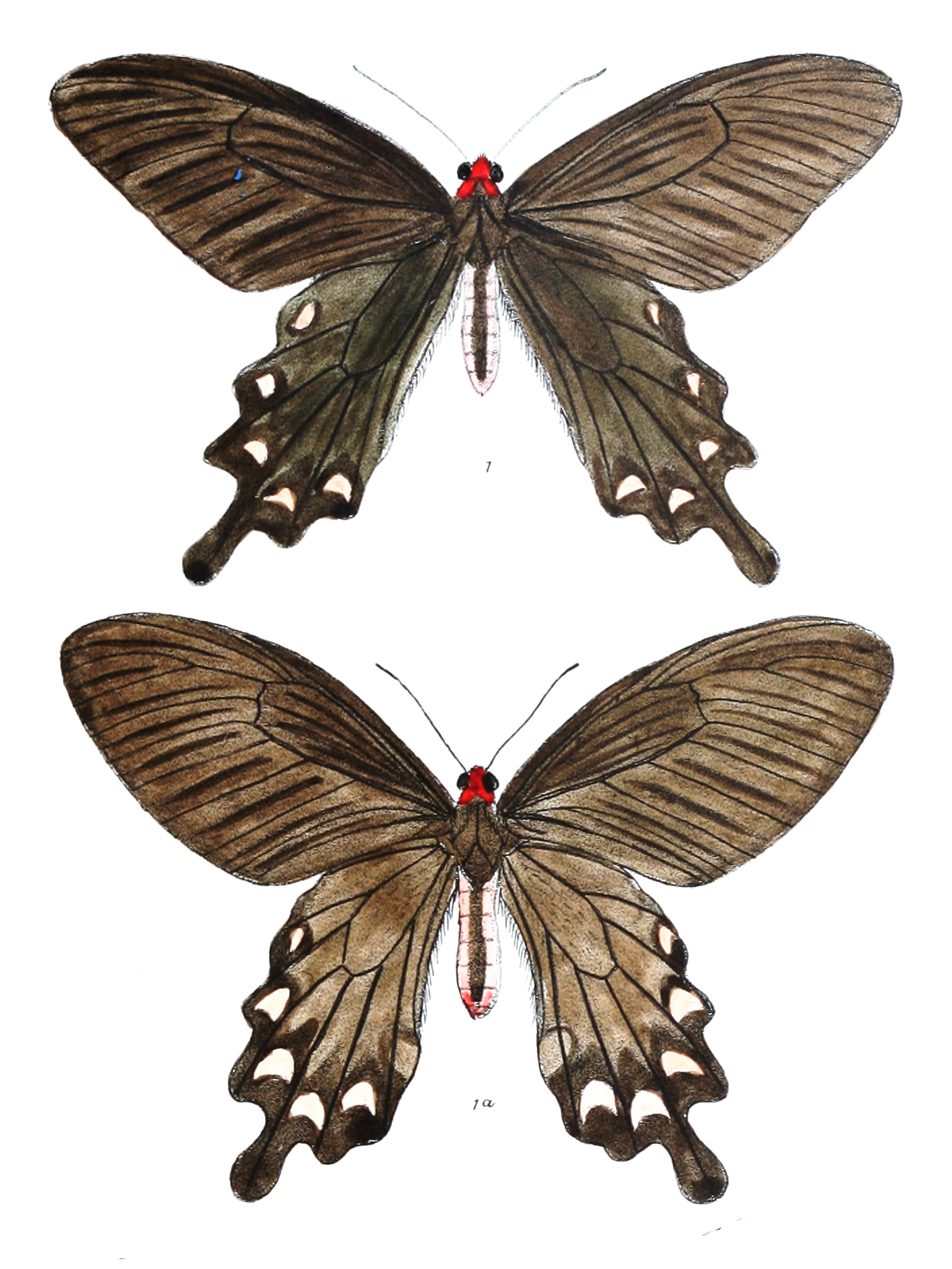
Pemberton's windmill

== Taxonomy ==
There are three subspecies.

== Description ==
- Wingspan: 100–120 mm.
- Tail black in both sexes.
- Male: Above, brownish black and unmarked except for a row of markings.

Pemberton's windmill (Sikkim, Bhutan) - This row from veins 2 to 6 on the upper hindwing consists of whitish marginal spots.
Tytler's windmill (Manipur, Naga and Chin hills) - This row consists of prominent black marginal spots on the upper hindwing and small red spot in vein 2.

- Female: Above, paler. The female has traces of red lunules on the margins from veins 3 to 6 on the upper hindwing.
