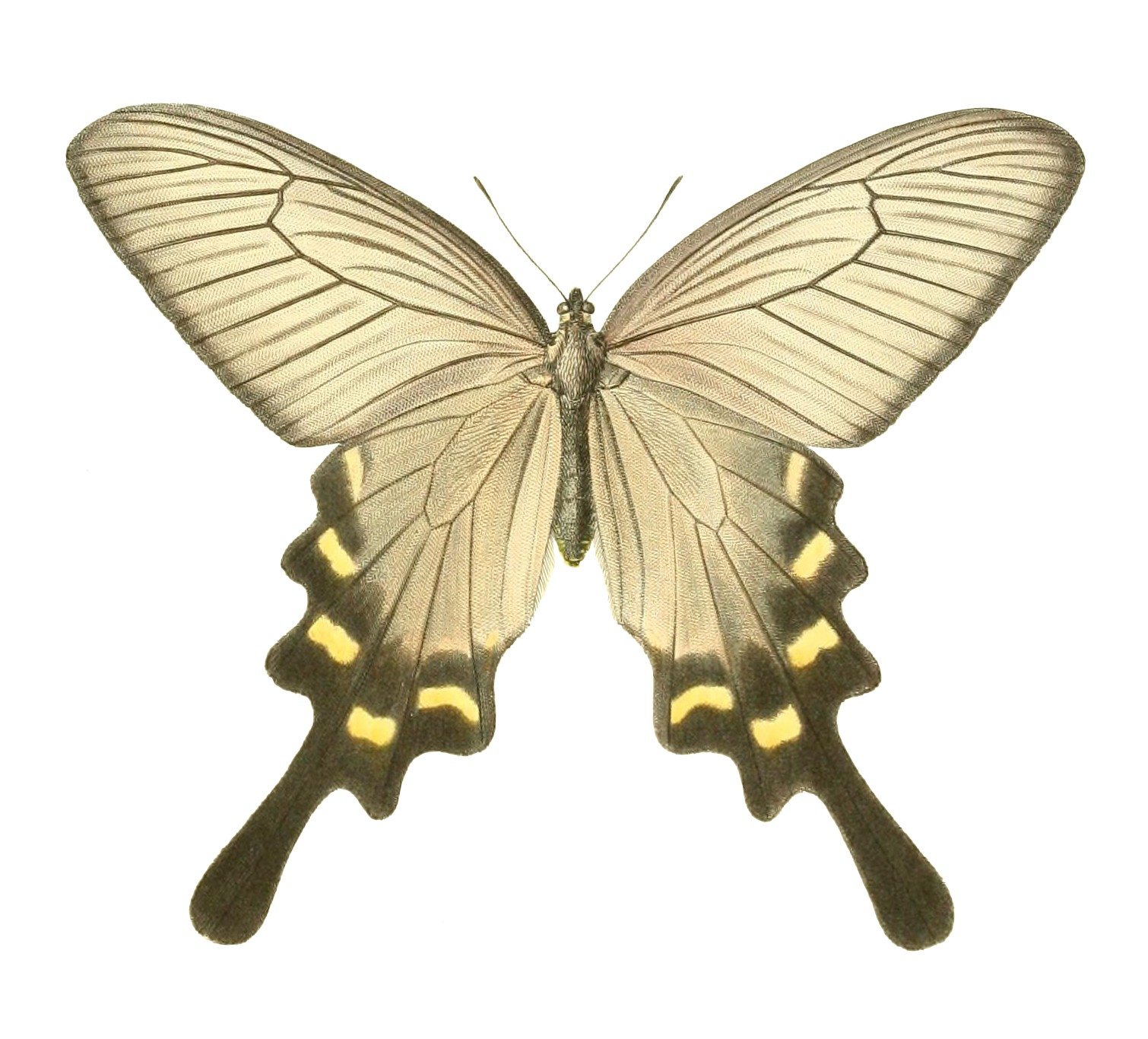

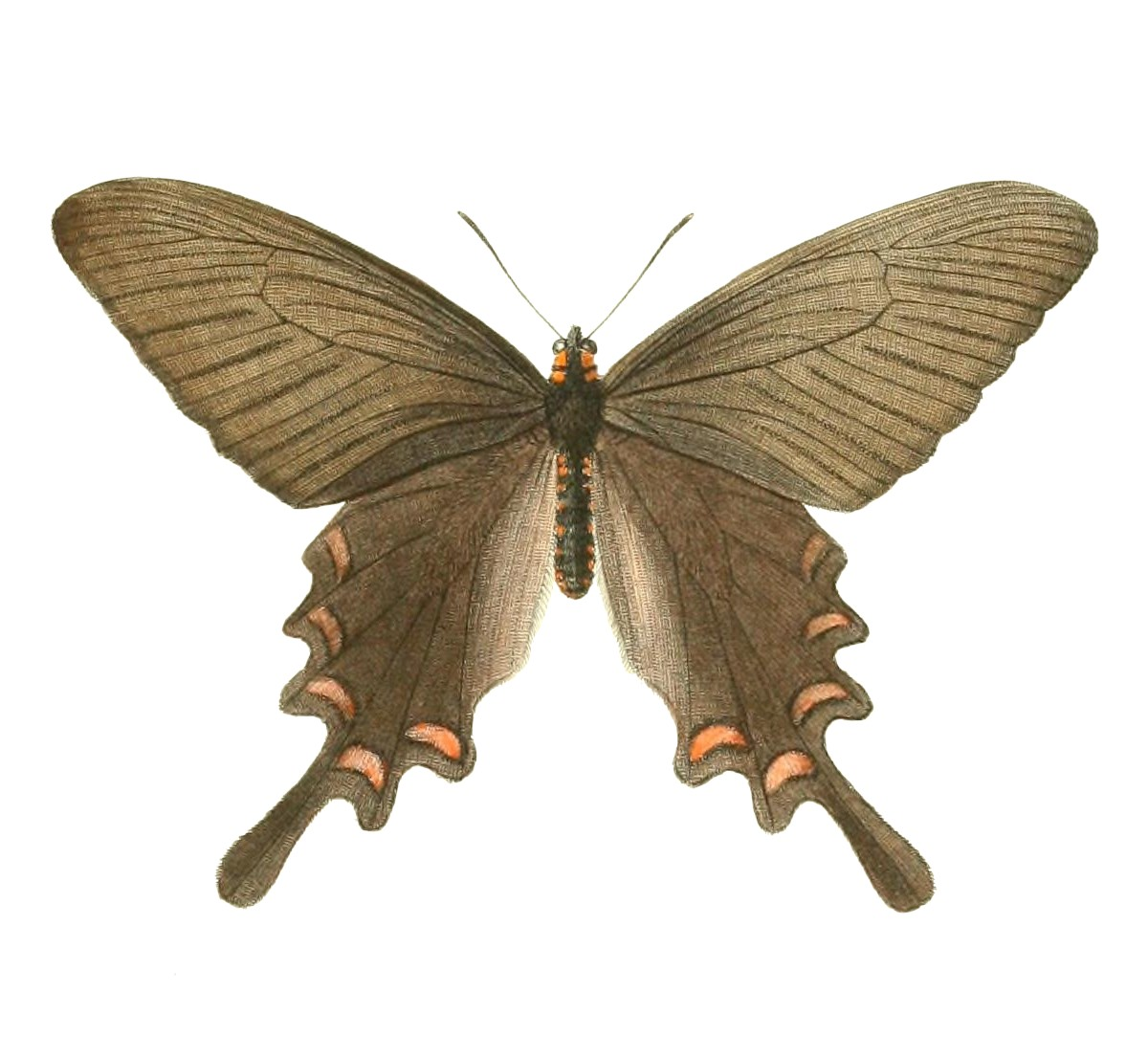

Scientific classification
- Kingdom: Animalia
- Phylum: Arthropoda
- Clade: Pancrustacea
- Class: Insecta
- Order: Lepidoptera
- Family: Papilionidae
- Genus: Byasa
- Species: B. alcinous

Binomial name
- Byasa alcinous (Klug, 1836)

Synonyms
- Papilio alcinous Klug, 1836; Papilio alcinous Rothschild, 1895; Papilio spathatus Butler, 1881; Papilio haemotostictus Butler, 1881; Papilio (Pharmacophagus) alcinous m.v. veris Sheljuzhko; Tros alcinous; Atrophaneura alcinous

= Byasa alcinous =

Species of butterfly

Byasa alcinous, the Chinese windmill, is a butterfly of the family Papilionidae.

== Description ==
Byasa alcinous has a wingspan reaching about 9–10 centimetres (3.5–3.9 in). The basic colour of the wings is black or dark brown. The hindwings have long tails and a chain of red spots at the edges. The thorax and the abdomen are mainly black on the upperside and the underside, with several black spots, while the other areas are red. Adults are on wing from May to August in two generations.

The larvae feed on Aristolochia species including A. mandshhuriensis, A. debilis and A. manchuriensis. Subspecies has been recorded on A. shimadai, A. liukiuensis, A. kankauensis, A. elegans, A. debilis, A. kaempferii, A. onoei, A. tagala, Cocculus trilobus and Metaplexis chinensis. The species overwinters as a pupa.

== Distribution ==
This species can be found in the Asian part of the Palaearctic realm and partially in the Indomalayan realm, from Bhutan, and eastern China to the southern Ussuri region, Korea and Japan.

== Habitat ==
Byasa alcinous is present in mixed broadleaved forests.

== Subspecies ==
- Byasa alcinous alcinous (Rothschild, 1895) (Japan)
- Byasa alcinous bradanus (Fruhstorfer, 1908) (Japan)
- Byasa alcinous loochooana (Rothschild, 1896) (Japan)
- Byasa alcinous. miyakoensis (Omoto, 1960) (Japan)
- Byasa alcinous yakushimana (Esaki & Umeno, 1929) (Japan)

See also the following where confusus may be treated as distinct valid species with mansonensis as a synonym.

- Byasa alcinous confusus (Rothschild, 1895) (Ussuri)
- Byasa alcinous mansonensis (Fruhstorfer, 1901) (south-central and south-eastern China, Taiwan)

See also

- Byasa alcinous tytleri Evans, 1923 (India, "Manipur")

== Gallery ==
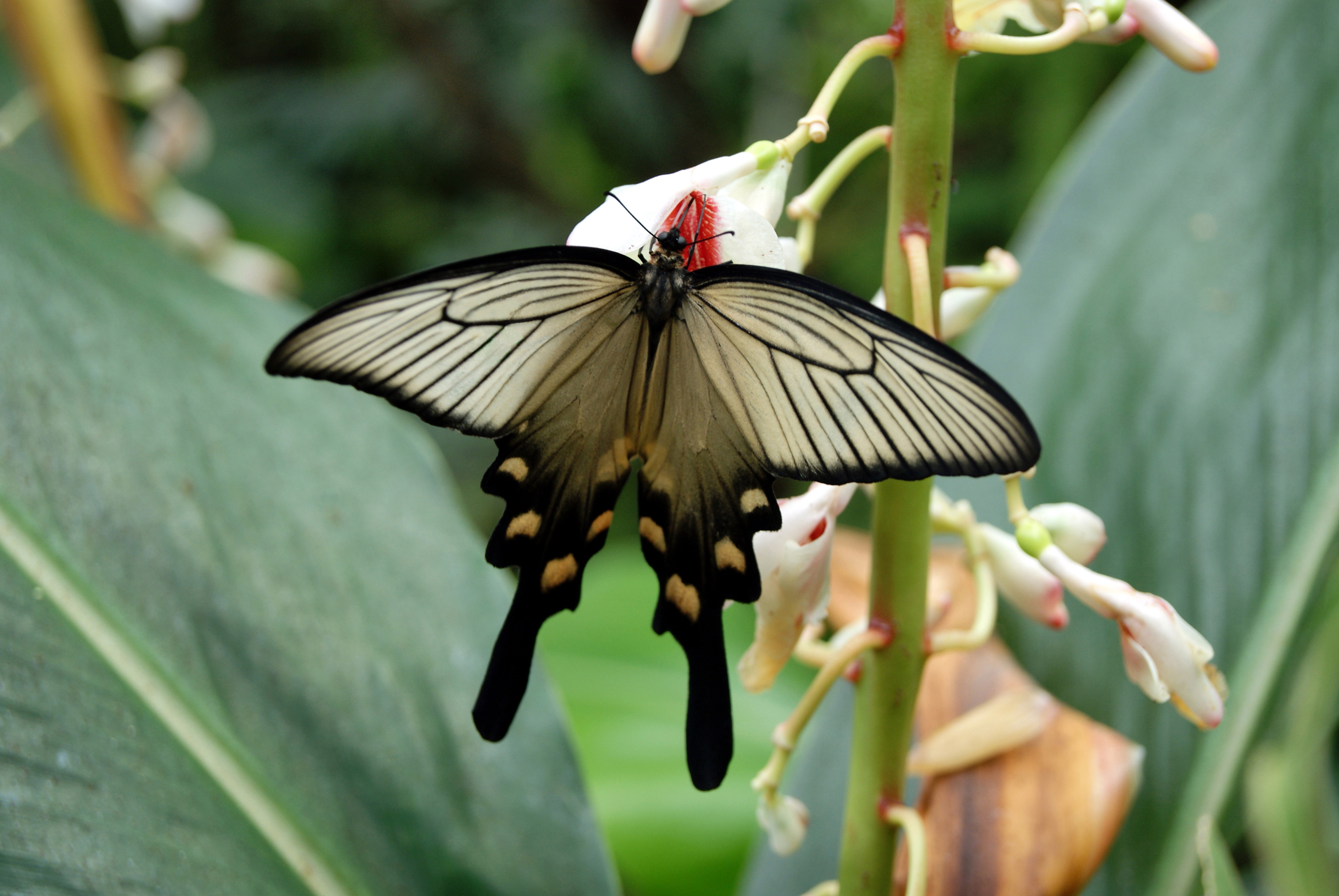
Dorsal view

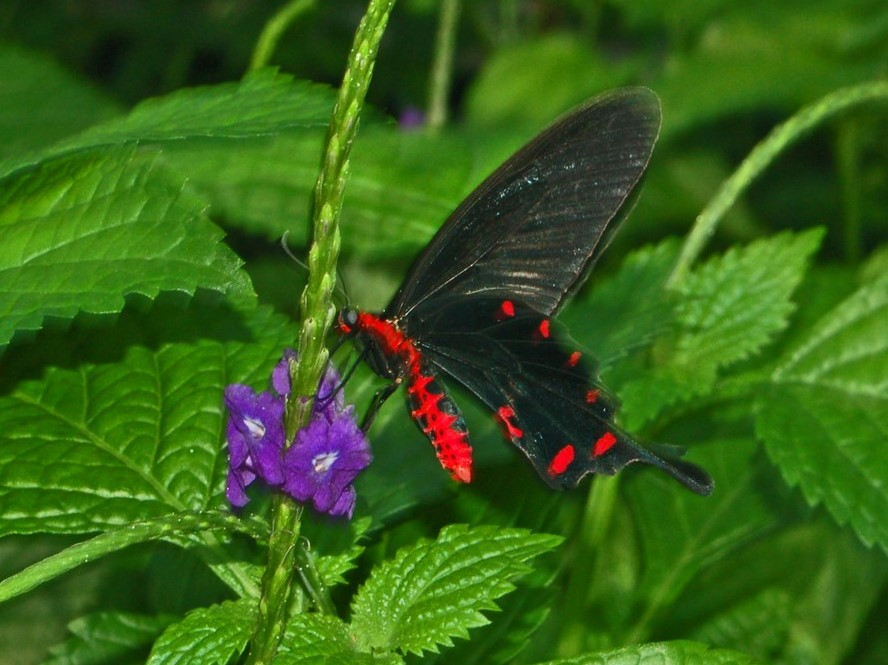
Ventral view

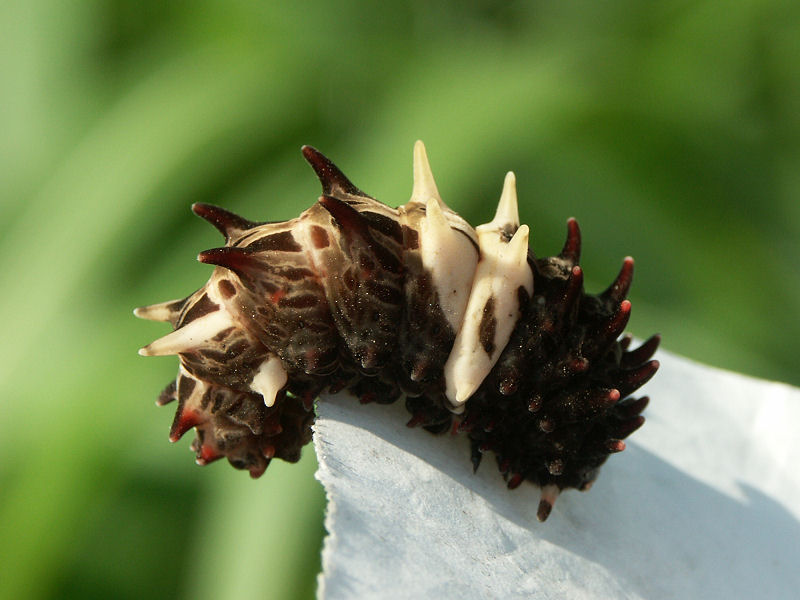
Caterpillar

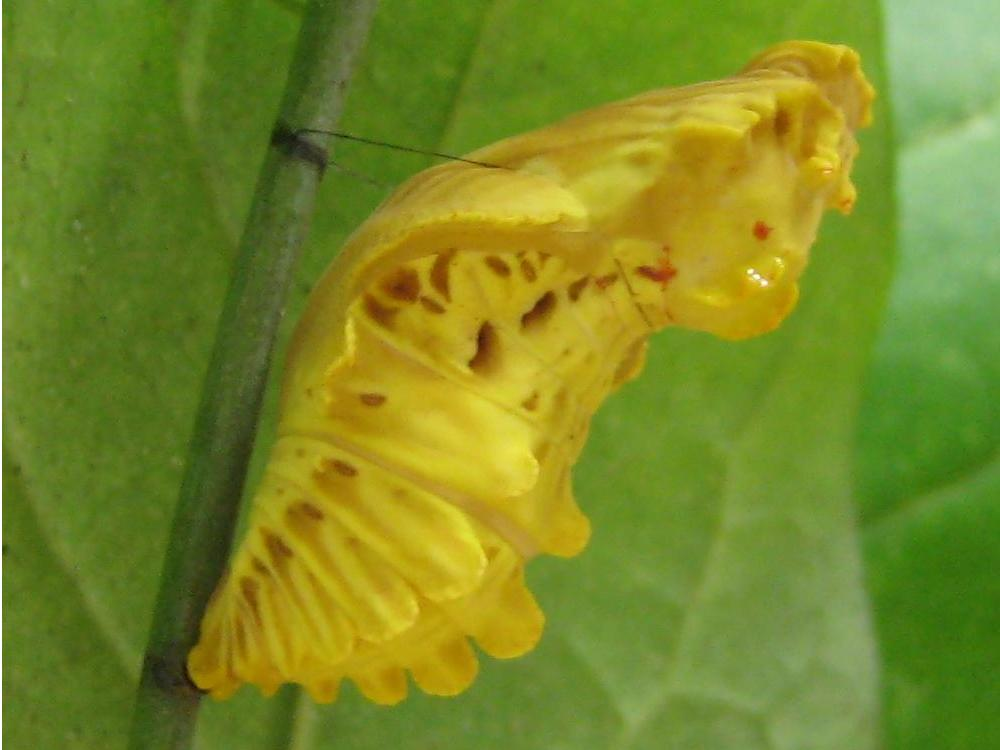
Chrysalis
