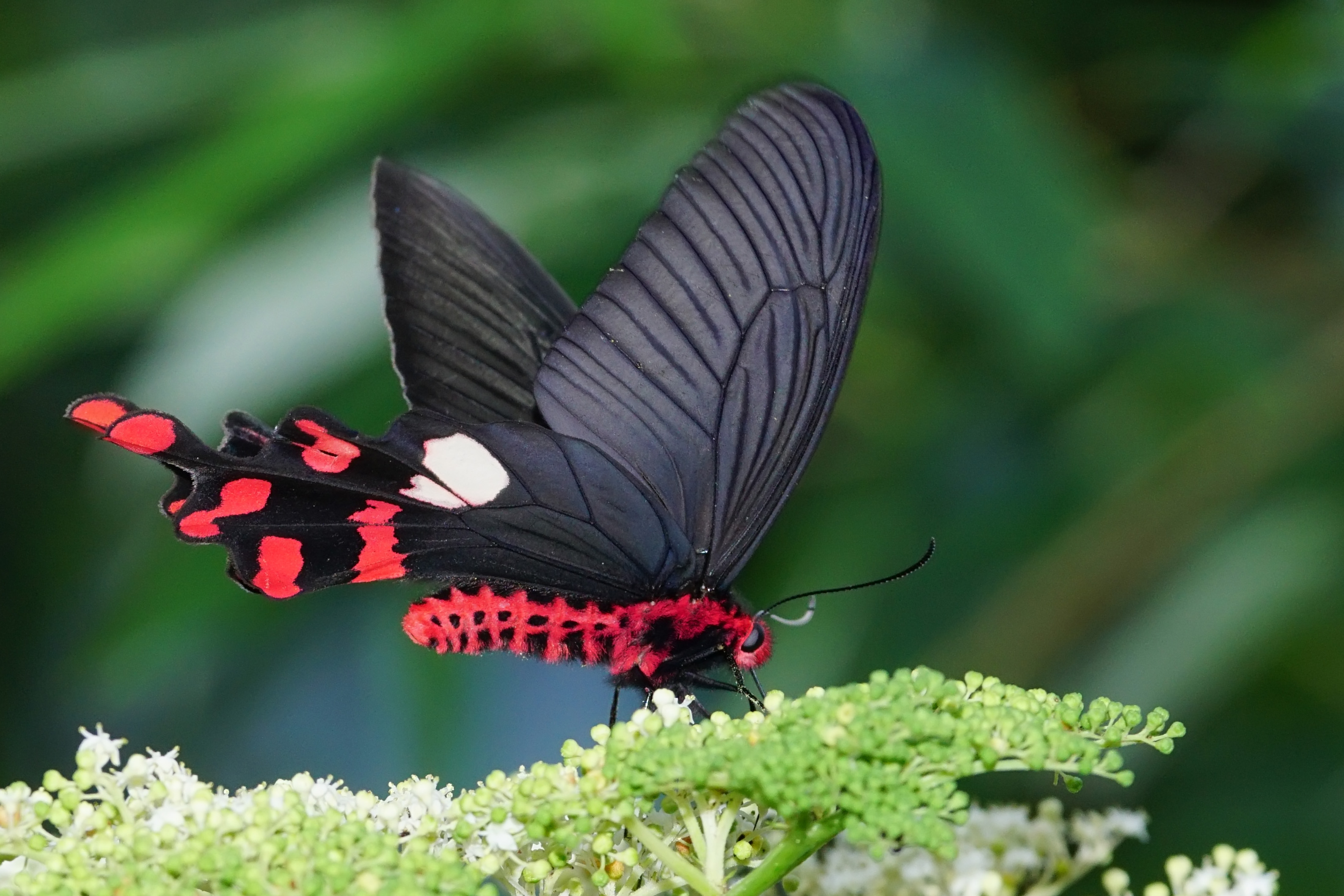
- B. p. termessus

Scientific classification
- Kingdom: Animalia
- Phylum: Arthropoda
- Clade: Pancrustacea
- Class: Insecta
- Order: Lepidoptera
- Family: Papilionidae
- Genus: Byasa
- Species: B. polyeuctes

Binomial name
- Byasa polyeuctes (Doubleday, 1842)

Synonyms
- Atrophaneura polyeuctes Doubleday, 1842; Atrophaneura philoxenus Gray

= Byasa polyeuctes =

Common windmill

Species of butterfly

Byasa polyeuctes, the common windmill, is the most common member in India of the windmills genus (Byasa), comprising tailed black swallowtail butterflies with white spots and red submarginal crescents.

== Range ==
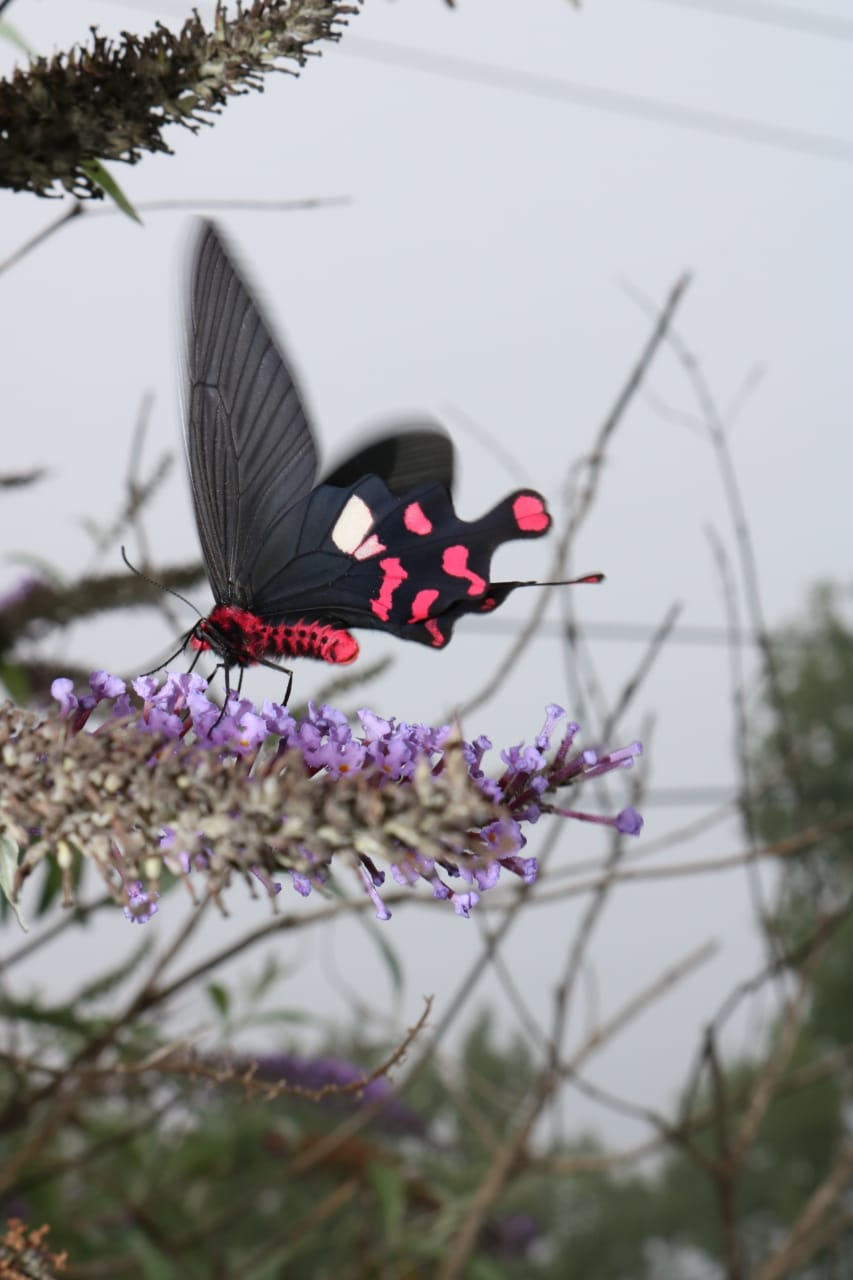
A common windmill spotted in Murree, Pakistan.

This butterfly lives in Pakistan, northern ranges of India, Nepal, Bhutan, Myanmar, northern Thailand, Laos, Vietnam, southern China (including Yunnan) and Taiwan.

In India, the Himalayas from Himachal Pradesh to Sikkim, Assam onto Chinese South Tibet region and northern Myanmar.

== Status ==
Overall, the butterfly is not rare. It is common in parts of Sikkim but becomes rarer westwards. It is extremely scarce in Shimla though not rare from Kangra.

In the west it ranges from the Azad Kashmir disputed territory part of the wider Kashmir region of Pakistan and India.

== Description ==
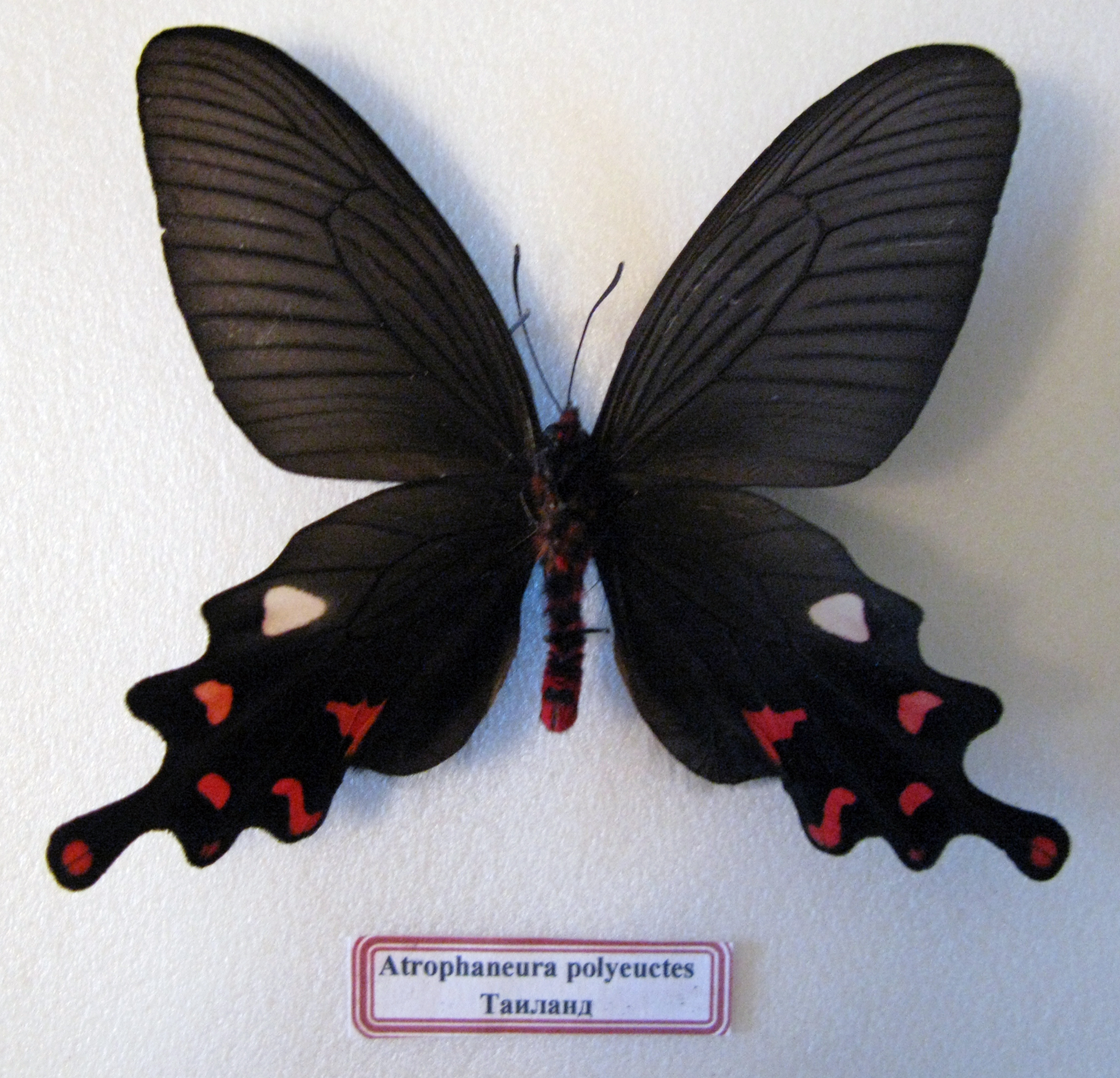
Mounted

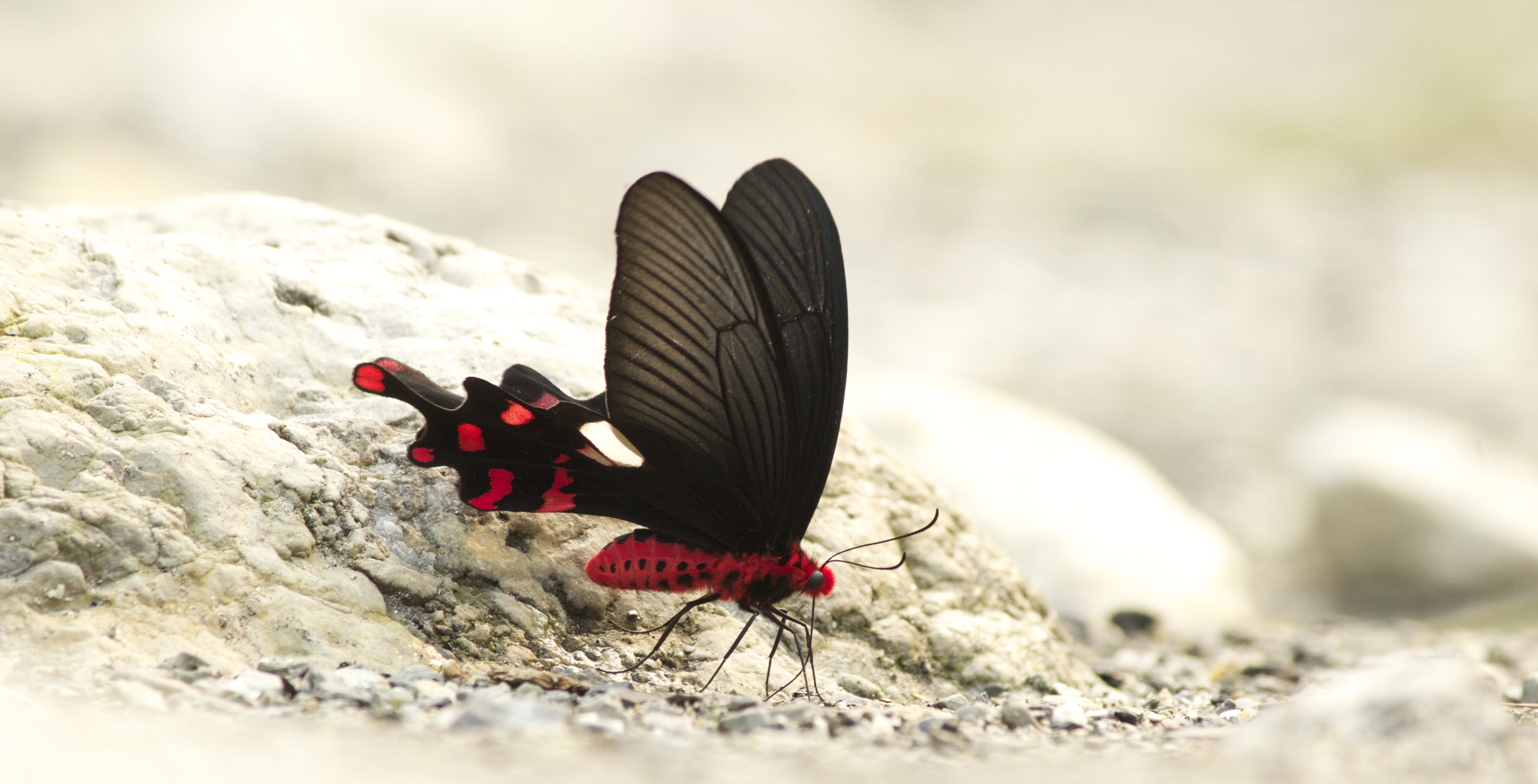
Mud-puddling of common windmill found in Jayanti river bed, Buxa Tiger Reserve, West Bengal, India.

- Length 110 to 140 mm
- Sexes alike
- Black and white above with prominent swallowtail
- Red bodied - tail has a red tip
- Forewings completely black above and below
- Hindwings crenulated deeply twice on each side of swallowtail. Large oblong white discal spot in 5 (both upperside and underside) and sometimes in 4. Upperside hindwing has irregular marginal red crescents in 1a, 2 and 3 and a small white spot in 4.

== Taxonomy ==
- Atrophaneura philoxenus Gray is considered a synonym.
- A species Atrophaneura lama (Oberthür), described from western China, is regarded as a subspecies of A. polyeuctes (now Byasa) by some.

=== Subspecies ===
It has four subspecies, two of which occur in India:

- B. p. polyeuctes Doubleday Sikkim to Myanmar - common
- B. p. philoxenus Gray Kashmir to Nepal - not rare
- B. p. lama (Oberthür, 1876) West China
- B. p. termessus (Fruhstorfer, 1908) Taiwan

=== Related species ===
- The three common species of windmills can be recognised by the differences in shape, number and location of white spots.
  - Rose windmill, Byasa latreillei, has a white discal band in 2, 3, 4 beyond the cell which is clearly trifurcated by black veins. A slightly smaller butterfly, the rose windmill has rose coloured lunules.
  - Great windmill, Byasa dasarada, has a number of two white spots in 4, 5 on the upperside of the hindwing and three spots on 4, 5 and 6 on the underside of the hindwing. It is a slightly larger butterfly with a broader swallowtail.
- Other windmills are smaller, rarer and have small differentiating characters from the above three common windmills. See the individual articles for more information:
  - de Nicéville's windmill (Byasa polla, de Nicéville)
  - Nevill's windmill (Byasa nevilli, Wood-Mason)
  - Black windmill (Byasa crassipes, Oberthür)
  - Chinese windmill (Byasa plutonius, Oberthür), two subspecies of which occur in India.

== Habitat ==
This butterfly prefers forests and woods. It frequents river valleys. It occurs at low elevations (1,000 to 5,000 feet (300 to 1,520 m)) in north east India but is found at higher altitudes in the western extent of its range – up to 11,000 feet (3,400 m) in Kashmir.

== Habits ==
This butterfly has a leisurely flight high above, but is easily recognisable by the thin long forewings and hindwings. It is attracted to flowers and visits Clemanthe, Buddleia, Lantana and Rhododendron blossoms.

It is mimicked by a day flying moth Epicopa (or Epicopia) polydorus, which flies at the same period and over the same range as the common windmill and has much the same manner and habits.

== Life cycle ==
This species has several broods where it finds suitable climate. It is seen on the wing between April and September. The imago has a foul odour.

== Food plants ==
- Family Nepenthaceae
  - Nepenthes species
- Family Aristolochiaceae
  - Aristolochia griffithi
  - Aristolochia shimadai

== See also ==
- Papilionidae
- List of butterflies of India
- List of butterflies of India (Papilionidae)
