= Puddling (behavior) =

Insect feeding behaviour

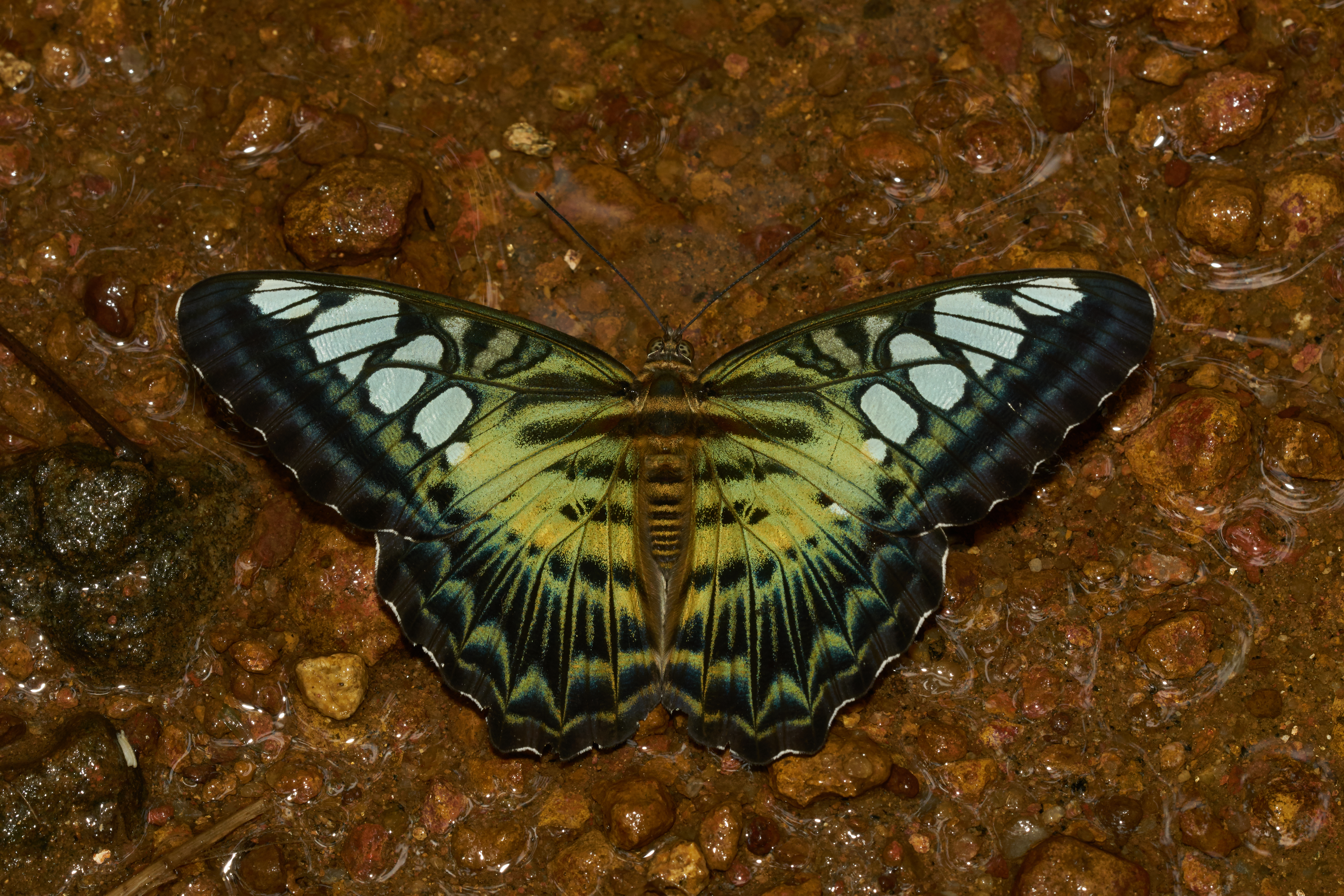
Parthenos sylvia mud-puddling at the edge of a forest stream

Puddling is a behaviour in which an organism seeks out nutrients in certain moist substances such as rotting plant matter, mud, and carrion, and sucks up the fluid. Where the conditions are suitable, conspicuous insects such as butterflies commonly form aggregations on wet soil, dung, or carrion. From the fluids they obtain salts and amino acids that play various roles in their physiology, ethology, and ecology. Most conspicuous in butterflies, this behaviour also has been seen in some other animals, primarily insects like the leafhoppers, e.g. the potato leafhopper, Empoasca fabae.

Lepidoptera (butterflies and moths) are diverse in their strategies to gather liquid nutrients. Typically, mud-puddling behaviour takes place on wet soil. But even sweat on human skin may be attractive to butterflies such as species of Halpe. More unusual sources include blood and tears. Again, similar behaviour is not limited to the Lepidoptera; for example, the various species of bees commonly called sweat bees are attracted to various kinds of sweat, including that of humans, and other bee species have been recorded as doing so to various degrees. Lachryphagous insects, including lepidopterans, dipterans, and bees, drink the tears of other animals.

In many species, puddling behaviour is more commonly seen in males. For example, Speyeria mormonia males puddle with a much higher frequency than females. The presence of an assembly of butterflies on the ground acts on Battus philenor, for example, as a stimulus to join the presumptive mud-puddling flock.

== On soil ==
In tropical India, this phenomenon is mostly seen in the post-monsoon season. The groups generally include several species, particularly members of the families Papilionidae and Pieridae.

Males seem to benefit from the sodium uptake through mud-puddling behaviour with an increase in reproductive success. The collected sodium and amino acids are often transferred to the female with the spermatophore during mating as a nuptial gift. This nutrition also enhances the survival rate of the eggs.

When puddling, many butterflies and moths pump fluid through the digestive tract and release fluid from their anus. In some, such as the male notodontid Gluphisia crenata, this is released in forced anal jets at 3 second intervals. Fluid of up to 600 times the body mass may pass through and males have a much longer ileum (anterior hindgut) than non-puddling females.

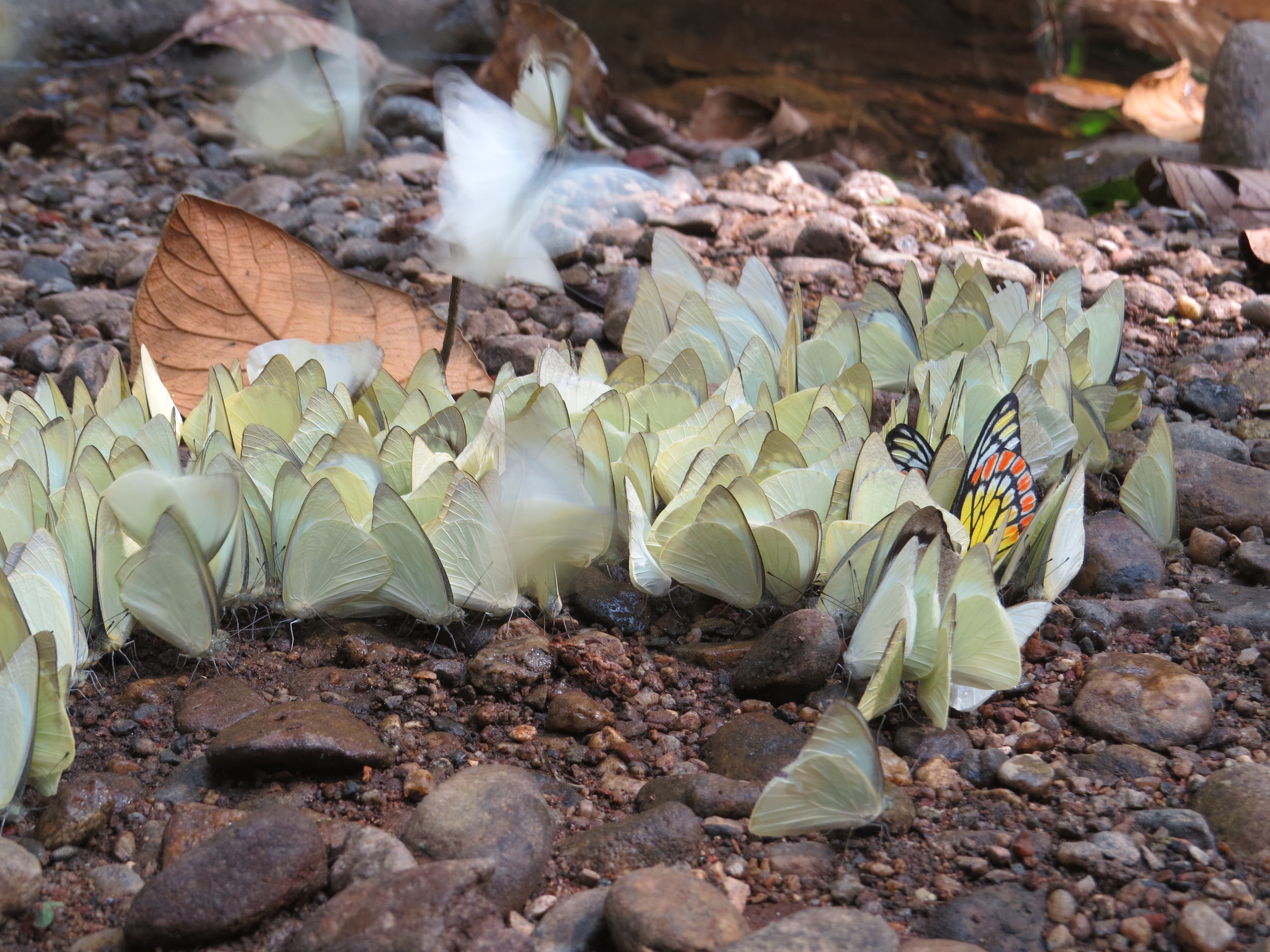
Aggregation of butterflies mud puddling

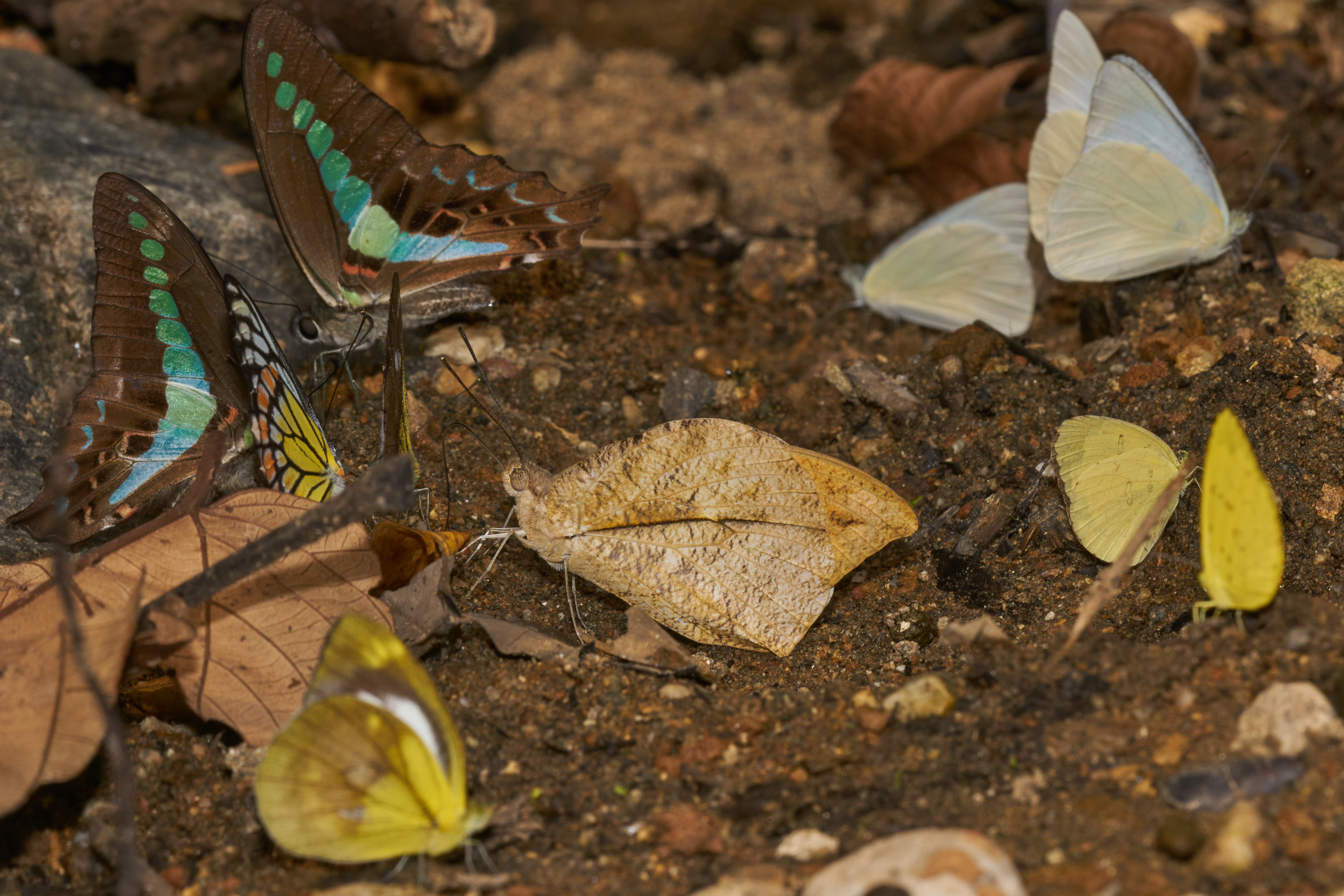
Collective of different butterfly species mud-puddling on a damp stream bed

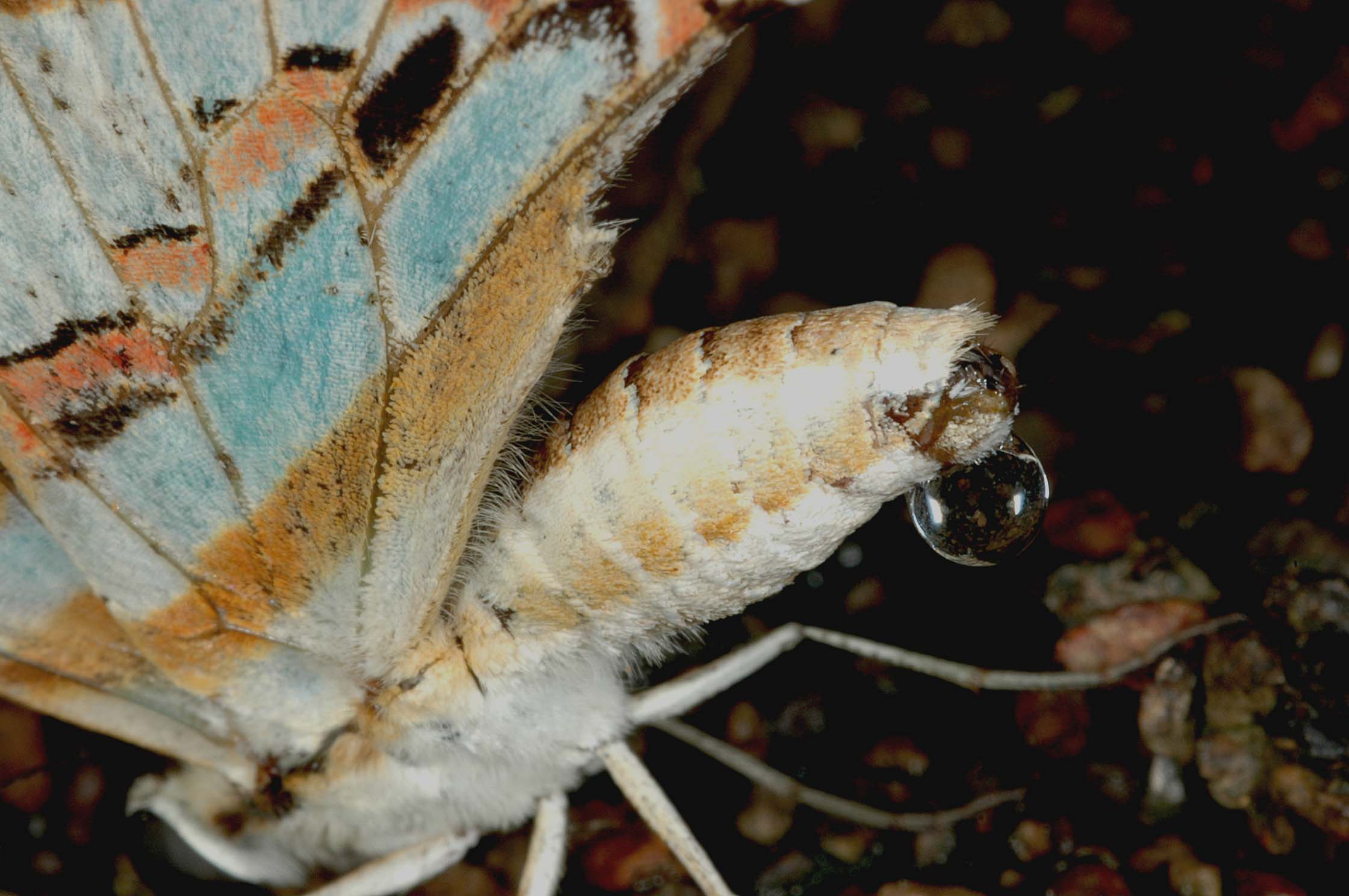
Spot swordtail excreting excess water after mud-puddling

Male Papilio glaucus mud-puddling

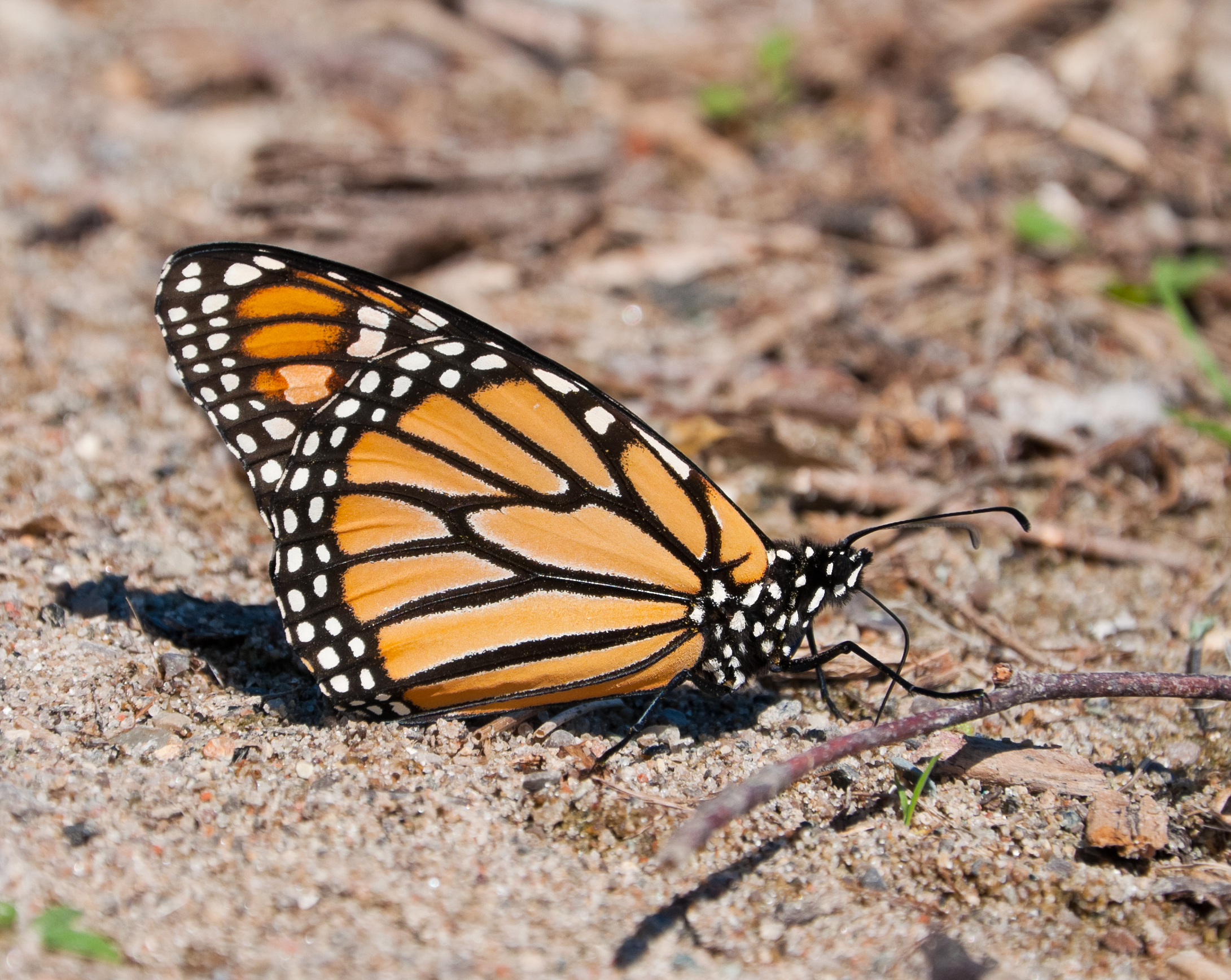
Male Monarch butterfly mud-puddling

Cabbage white (Pieris rapae) butterflies mud-puddling

== Other sources of liquid nutrient ==
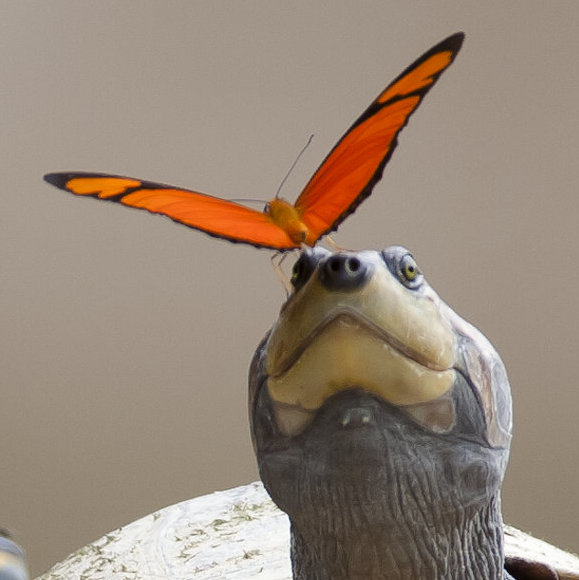
A Dryas iulia butterfly drinking from the tears of a turtle

Some Orthoptera – e.g. the yellow-spined bamboo locust (Ceracris kiangsu) are attracted to human urine, specifically to the sodium and ammonium ions in it. Those Lepidoptera that are attracted to dung (e.g. Zeuxidia spp.) or carrion seem to prefer ammonium ions rather than sodium. In rotting, the tissues of fruits release sugars and other organic compounds such as alcohols that result from the metabolic processes of decay organisms, used as fuel by butterflies.

In Borneo lowland rain forest, numerous species of butterflies regularly visit decaying fruit to drink. This behavior is mainly opportunistic, though some are highly attracted to old fruit, notably Satyrinae (e.g. Neorina lowii) and Limenitidinae such as Bassarona dunya.

Carrion is usually more intentionally utilized. Carrion-feeders seem to represent a different feeding guild from "classical" mud-puddlers and fruit-feeders. They include diverse taxa, e.g. brush-footed butterflies such as Cirrochroa emalea of the Nymphalinae or the tawny rajah (Charaxes bernardus) of the Charaxinae, as well as gossamer-winged butterflies like Curetis tagalica of the Curetinae or the common imperial (Cheritra freja) of the Theclinae.

Carrion-feeding has evolved independently in several lineages. Specialist carrion-feeders may even have the ability to smell out and home in on rotting meat over hundreds of meters. In the Bornean Charaxinae, specialist (Charaxes bernardus) or opportunistic (some other Charaxes and Polyura) carrion-feeders tend to have a markedly larger bulk and smaller wings, making them more dashing, maneuverable flyers than fruit specialists like Prothoe franck and opportunistic fruit visitors such as Charaxes durnfordi. Other butterflies like most Pieridae, Papilionidae and Morphinae are rarely if ever seen on carrion, dung and rotting fruit, though they may be avid mud-puddlers in the strict sense. Altogether, the Nymphalidae show the highest variety of nutrient-gathering strategies among the butterflies; the Limenitidinae have numerous mud-puddlers that also frequently visit dung but avoid fruits and carrion (namely the genus Limenitis), and some which are attracted to any pungent substance.

Certain moths, mainly of the subfamily Calpinae, are somewhat notorious for their blood- and tear-drinking habits. Hemiceratoides hieroglyphica of Madagascar has been noted to visit and suck tears by inserting their proboscis into the closed eyelids of roosting birds. Similar behaviour has been reported in Azeta melanea in Colombia and Gorgone macarea in Brazil. Other cases of moths drinking human tears have been reported from Thailand. Some species of the genus Calyptra are called "vampire moths" as they suck blood from sleeping vertebrates, including humans. Ophthalmotropy (eye-attraction) and lachryphagy (tear drinking) occur in a number of unrelated moths that visit mammals. Lobocraspis griseifusa is a notable example. Stingless bees in the genera Lisotrigona and Pariotrigona visit the eyes of mammals and have been known to cause distress to humans. Dryas iulia has also been observed agitating the eyes of caimans and turtles in order to force tear production, which the male butterflies of the species can drink for minerals. The minerals, which can also be obtained from more typical mud-puddling behavior, are used for the butterfly's spermatophores during sexual reproduction.

Tear-drinking is not limited to moths, but has recently also been observed in cockroaches. This behaviour might thus be far more common than previously thought.

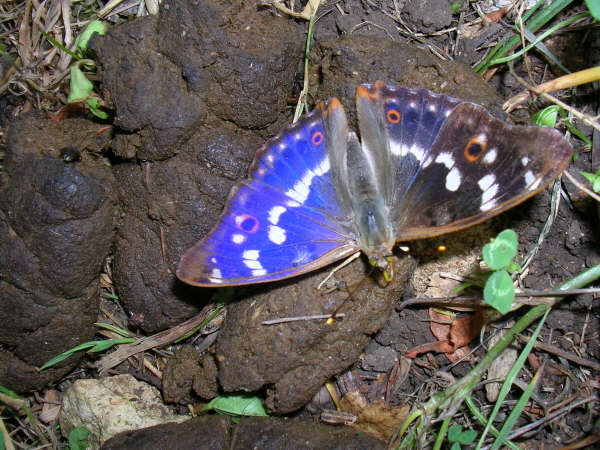
Blue lesser purple emperor (Apatura ilia f. ilia) on dung

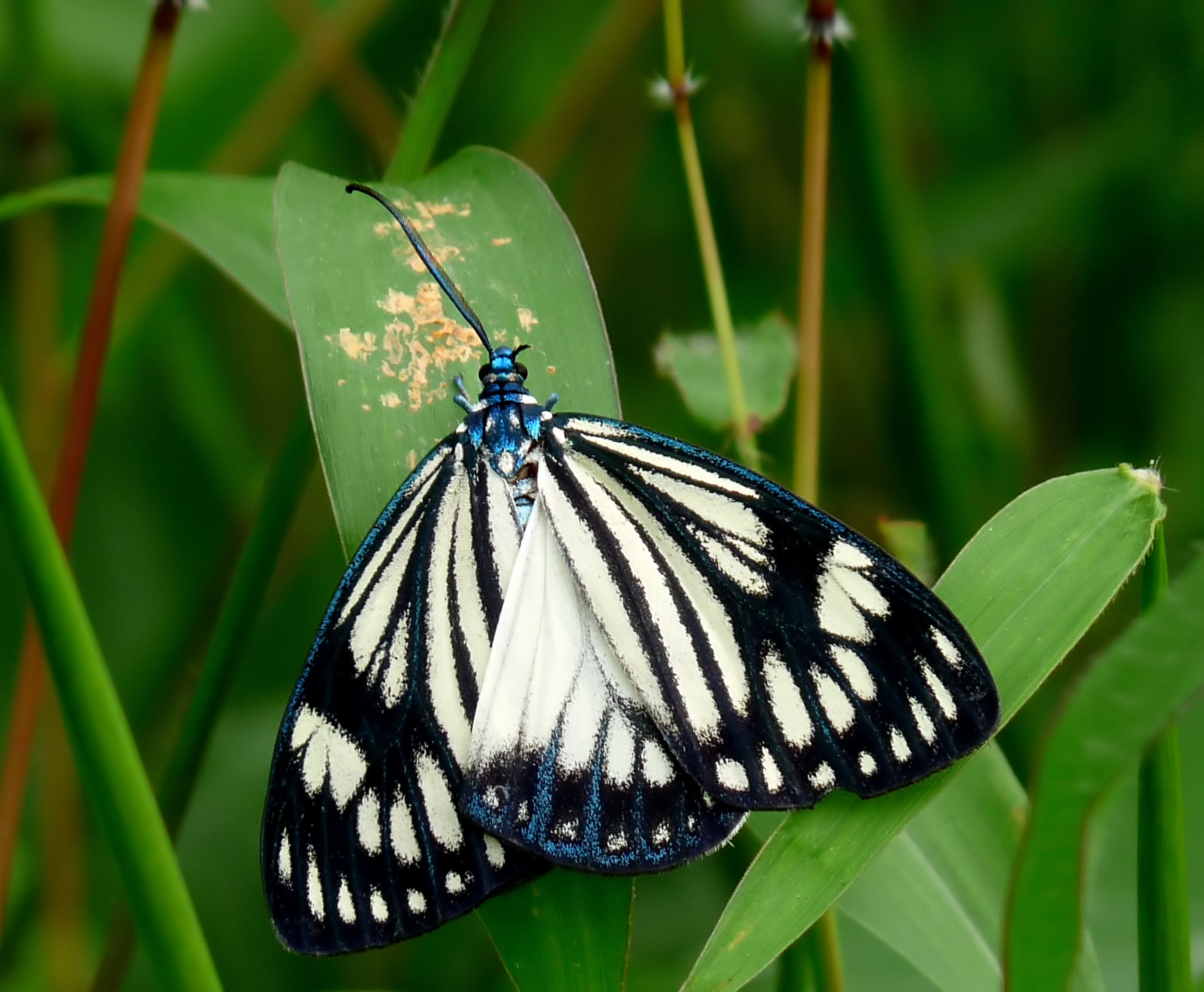
Cyclosia papilionaris feeding on a bird dropping

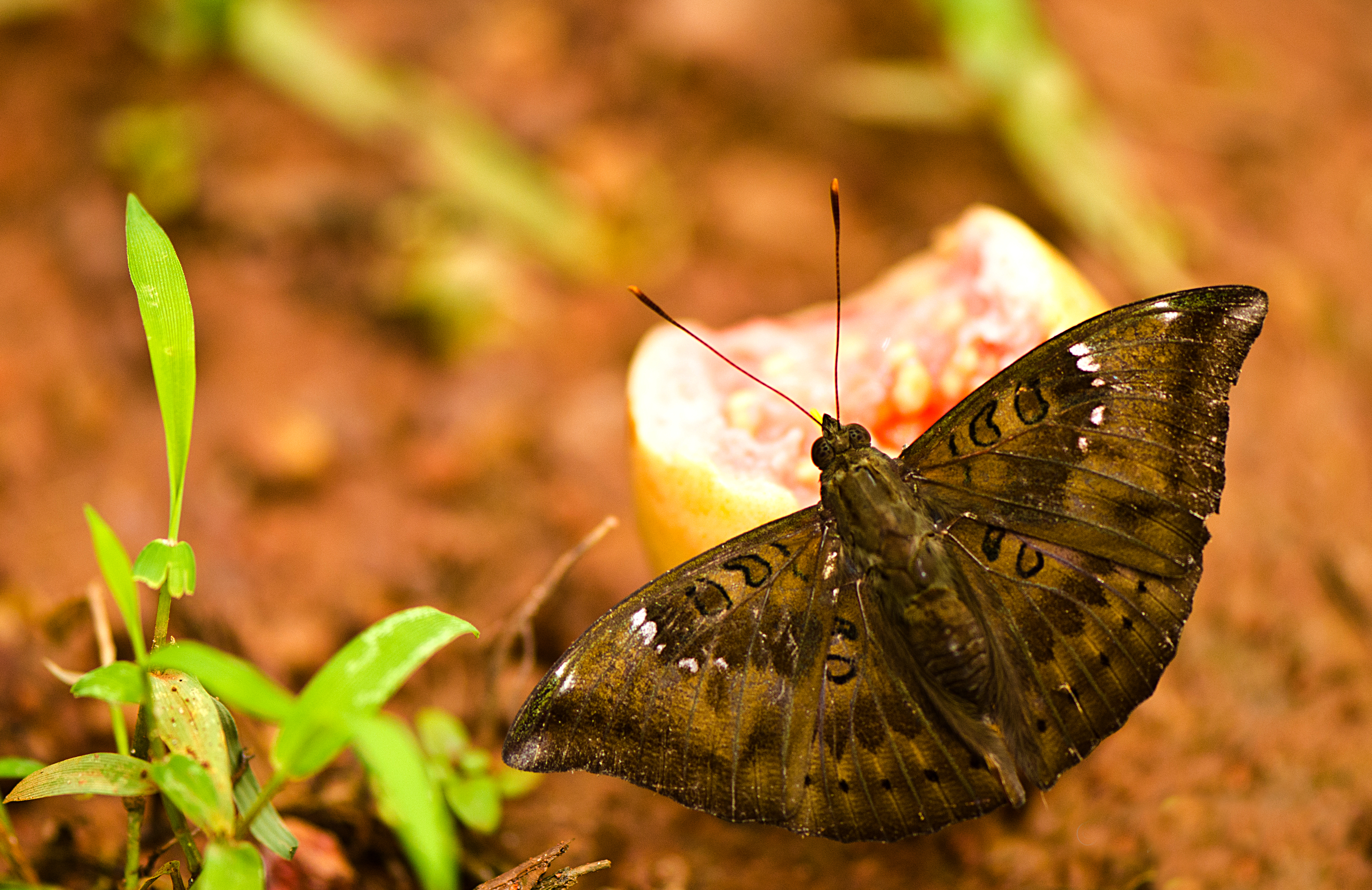
Common baron (Euthalia aconthea) sipping from a guava fruit

Catagramma pygas drinking from metal fence
