= Gluphisia septentrionis =

Conservation status
- Secure (NatureServe)

Scientific classification
- Kingdom: Animalia
- Phylum: Arthropoda
- Clade: Pancrustacea
- Class: Insecta
- Order: Lepidoptera
- Superfamily: Noctuoidea
- Family: Notodontidae
- Genus: Gluphisia
- Species: G. septentrionis

Binomial name
- Gluphisia septentrionis Walker, 1855

Synonyms
- List: Gluphisia septentrionalis Walker, 1855; Gluphisia septentrionalis f. opaca Barnes & Benjamin, 1927; Dasychira clandestina Walker, 1861; Gluphisia quinquelinea Dyar, 1892; Gluphisia ridenda Edwards, 1886; Gluphisia rupta Edwards, 1886; Gluphisia trilineata Packard, 1890

Species of moth

Gluphisia septentrionis, the common gluphisia moth, (Note: Also known as the common gluphisia, or common pebble moth.) is a species of moth in the family Notodontidae. It is pepper-gray to brown, with darker cross-stripes. It can be found throughout much of North America, but is most commonly found in montane coniferous or mixed forests where its host plants grow. Its larvae primarily feed on species of poplar, as well as willows. Adults are active throughout the summer, with two generations produced each year. Caterpillars born towards the end of the summer will over winter in the pupal stage, before emerging the following spring.

== Description ==
The common gluphisa moth has mottled peppery gray to brown forewings with darker, toothed cross-stripes and a distinctive lighter white or pale-yellow patch near its costa, as well as lighter hindwings. Wingspan typically ranges from 35–45 mm (1.4–1.8 in), and total length (from head to tail) ranges from 14–17 mm (0.55–0.67 in). Much of its abdomen and thorax are covered in short white hairs matching the rest of its coloration. Like many other species in its family, it holds its wings in a triangle or tent-like shape when at rest. They have pectinate antenna, with females having shorter branches than males.

Caterpillars measure up to 50 mm (2.0 in), with most being a pale green with yellow stripes running down the length of their body, and thicker red stripes crosswise, although some may be partially or entirely lacking the red ones. They have a prominent hump behind their head, followed by smaller humps along the length of their body. They develop through five instars, with their features being most prominent as they mature.

Pupae range from green to brown, and are flattened at the back and front like many other members of its family.

Eggs are small and slightly flattened at the bottom, they are initially green, but darken with age until they are more cream colored.

Forewing color, dark and toothed lines, a central lighter white or yellow patch, and pectinate antennae are used to distinguish G. septentrionis from other species.

A caterpillar after feeding on a leaf.

== Range ==
In North America, the common gluphisia moth is widespread, found from Alaska and northern Canada, down through the Rockies, and across to the Atlantic coast. Broadly, it can be found anywhere in the United States and Canada, save for Nunavut and the Northwest Territories, although it will primarily be found in areas where their host plants are present.

== Human Interaction ==
A poplar plantation, of the sort that have been harmed by caterpillars

Common gluphisia caterpillars have caused significant damage to poplar farms through defoliation due to their preference for poplar trees as host plants, with late stage caterpillars being able to eat 95% of a leaf each day. Although specific biological control methods are not available, limited use of insecticides or the introduction of predatory or parasitoidal species have been found to have significant positive effects.

=== Threats ===
Although they may face some minor local threats due to logging and habitat degradation, it faces no broad threats across its range, and is listed as secure by NatureServe in addition to not being listed on any major federal endangered species database across its range.

== Host plants ==
Larvae will primarily feed on poplar, as well as sometimes willow species, especially quaking aspen and black cottonwood (both of which are poplars); the widespread nature of which lead to its proliferation across North America. Some less common host species are listed below:

- Alder (Alnus incana)
- Birch (Betula alleghaniensis and B. papyrifera)
- Butternut (Juglans cinerea)
- Sweetgum (Liquidambar styraciflua)
- Elm (Ulmus americana)
- Basswood (Tilia spp.).
Quaking aspen leaves, one on the species most common host plants

Black cottonwood trees in the flooded Columbia River

Black Willow leaves in Arkansas

== Ecology ==
=== Habitat ===
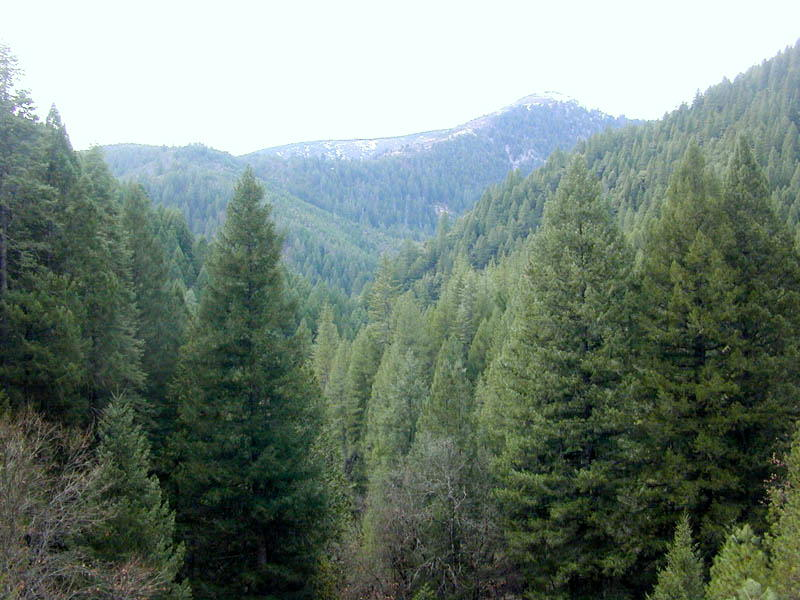
Conifer forests in the Sierra Nevadas, where common gluphisia moths can often be found.

Although it can be found anywhere within its range where its host plants grow, especially species of poplar, the common gluphisia moth prefers montane coniferous forests interspersed with poplar trees. Furthermore, these moths prefer mature stands and forest edges, especially regions with moderate to high canopy cover where they can easily access sources of water.

=== Behavior ===
Adults are active throughout the summer, from April to September in warmer regions; with a more restricted time further north, and with flight activity peaking in June and August. The species produces two generations per year, with females depositing eggs on the underside of the leaves of their host plant. Mature individuals are crepuscular, and live for 8–10 days, with males having shorter lifespans than females. During the summer, their life cycle takes 36–47 days, but it is much longer in the winter, as they will remain as pupae until the following spring.

Eggs are laid on the undersides of leaves, either alone or in groups of about 5–10. They darken with age, in total take about 4–6 days to hatch once laid.

==== Larvae and pupae ====
Caterpillars will spend most of their time resting on bark or in leaf litter, feeding primarily at night. They have five instars, with the first three developing in 3–4 days, and the later two taking 4 or 5. After hatching, the caterpillar will feed away from the egg, and early instars (1–3) will use small amounts of silk to attach themselves to their leaf. Larvae in the first two instars will skeletonize leaves, causing significant damage. After a brief pre-pupal stage lasting 2–3 days, they will enter their pupal stage in the leaf litter as well, which lasts 6–8 days in the summer, whereas during the fall caterpillars will overwinter as pupae before emerging the following spring.

A caterpillar in the leaf litter, where they are most often found during the day.

A skeletonized leaf, showing the type of damage caused by common gluphisia caterpillars.

==== Puddling ====
Like many other lepidopterans, common gluphisia moths will puddle to gain necessary nutrients, especially sodium. Furthermore, males of the species, which puddle more frequently, will give much of the sodium they have taken in to mates, allowing for stronger and healthier offspring. The common gluphisia moth was the first insect this behavior was observed in.

=== Predators and Parasites ===
An eastern yellow-jacket attacking a common gluphisia moth.

A wide number of species will predate or parasitize common gluphisia moths. Stink bugs, and, like other members of its genus, wasps, are common predators, especially of their larvae. Eulophus orgyiae, a small wasp, Trichogramma species, and tachinid flies are parasatoids of the species' larvae, eggs, and pupae respectively.

== See also ==
- List of moths of North America (MONA 7649–8321)
- List of moths of Canada (Notodontidae)
