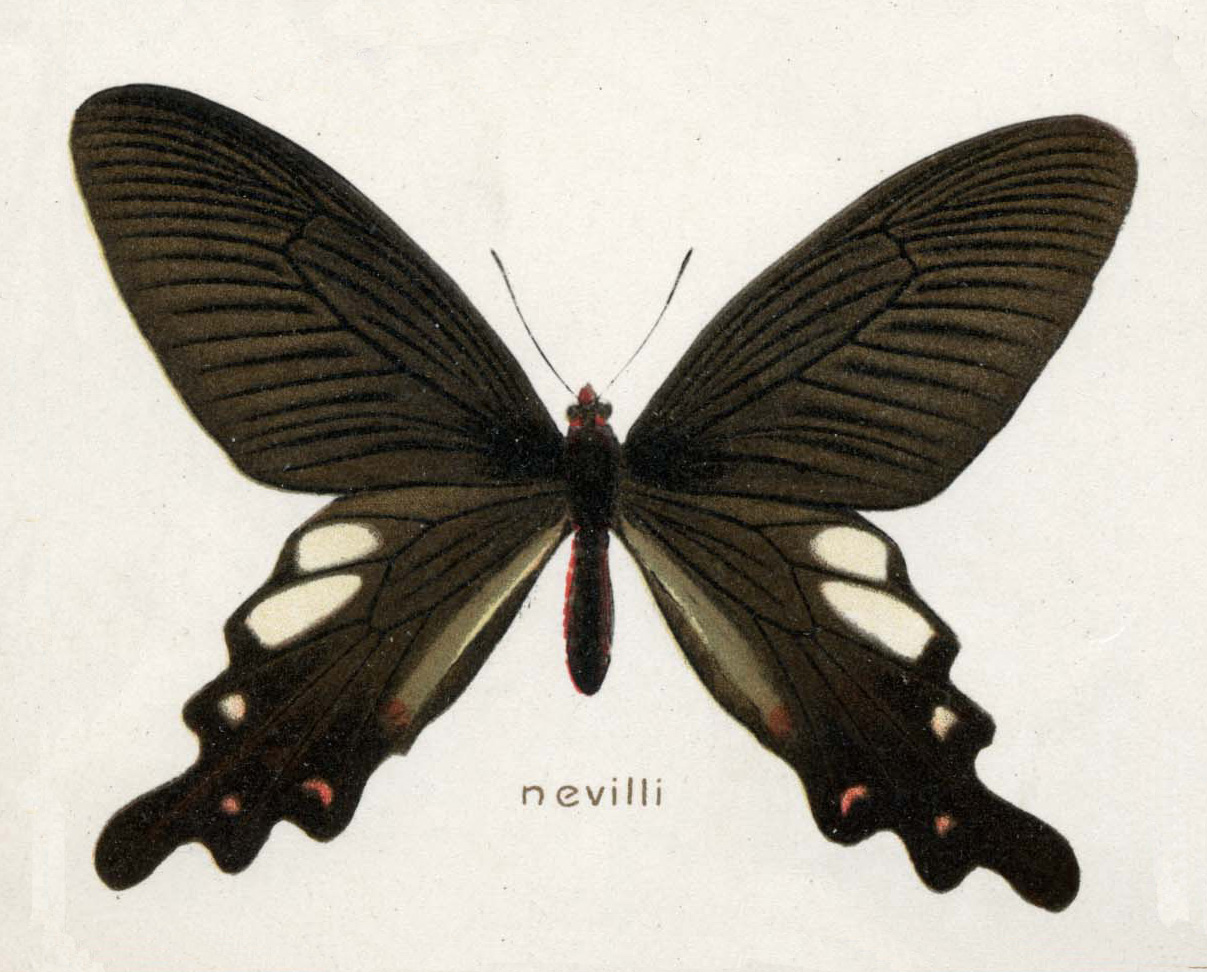

Scientific classification
- Domain: Eukaryota
- Kingdom: Animalia
- Phylum: Arthropoda
- Class: Insecta
- Order: Lepidoptera
- Family: Papilionidae
- Genus: Byasa
- Species: B. nevilli

Binomial name
- Byasa nevilli Wood-Mason, 1882

Synonyms
- Atrophaneura nevilli

= Byasa nevilli =

Nevill's windmill

Species of butterfly

Byasa nevilli, the Nevill's windmill, is a butterfly found in India that belongs to the windmills genus (Byasa), comprising tailed black swallowtail butterflies with white spots and red submarginal crescents.

== Range ==
North east India (Assam), Myanmar (Shan states) and western China.

== Status ==
It is very common in western China and very rare in India. This butterfly is protected in India though it is not known to be threatened.

== Taxonomy ==
No separate subspecies have been described.

== Description ==
The wingspan is 100–120 mm. In appearance it is similar to the great windmill (Byasa dasarada), but is smaller. The tail is not red-tipped. It also resembles the great windmill subspecies B. d. ravana, Moore, but is smaller, with the markings also proportionately smaller. The male differs as follows: the subterminal series of lunules on the hindwing are crimson or vermilion red, never white or partly white as in B. d. ravana; sexual abdominal fold within white, not blackish brown; the subterminal red lunule in interspace 3 very often missing. Female resembles the male rather than the female of B. d. ravana but the white rectangular markings in interspaces 5 and 6 are whiter. From B. d. ravana female it differs in the complete absence of the white discal spots in interspaces 1, 2, 3 and 4. In both sexes the tail is black without any red spot.

== See also ==
- Papilionidae
- List of butterflies of India
- List of butterflies of India (Papilionidae)
