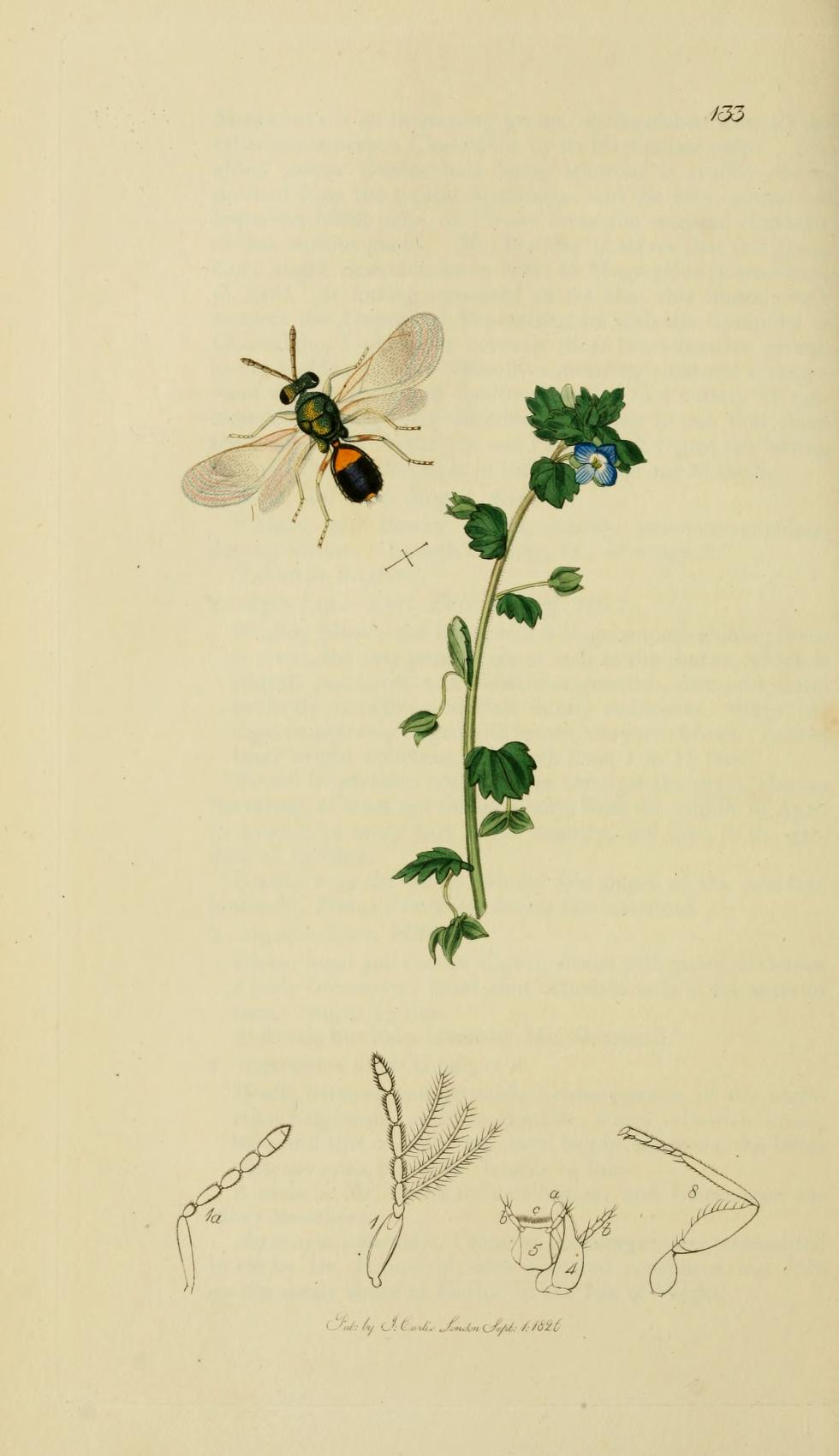
- Eulophus ramicornis

Scientific classification
- Kingdom: Animalia
- Phylum: Arthropoda
- Clade: Pancrustacea
- Class: Insecta
- Order: Hymenoptera
- Family: Eulophidae
- Subfamily: Eulophinae
- Genus: Eulophus; Geoffroy, 1762

Type species
- Eulophus ramicornis (Fabricius, 1781)

Species
- see text, 70 species

= Eulophus =

Genus of wasps

Eulophus is a genus of wasps of the family Eulophidae.

== Species ==
List of species
- Eulophus abdominalis
- Eulophus aepulo
- Eulophus agathyllus
- Eulophus albitarsus
- Eulophus almoriensis
- Eulophus anomocerus
- Eulophus basalis
- Eulophus bifasciatus
- Eulophus binotatus
- Eulophus blancardellae
- Eulophus boeotus
- Eulophus breviramulis
- Eulophus callidius
- Eulophus carbo
- Eulophus cecidomyiarum
- Eulophus cemiostomatis
- Eulophus cephalotes
- Eulophus cervus
- Eulophus chennaicus
- Eulophus chrysomelae
- Eulophus citripes
- Eulophus coccorum
- Eulophus crinicornis
- Eulophus cyanescens
- Eulophus depressus
- Eulophus dubitabilis
- Eulophus elegantulus
- Eulophus emicans
- Eulophus entheus
- Eulophus eucritus
- Eulophus femoralis
- Eulophus foveolatus
- Eulophus gummiferae
- Eulophus iapetus
- Eulophus idrieus
- Eulophus inconspicuus
- Eulophus incubitor
- Eulophus kirbii
- Eulophus koebelei
- Eulophus larvarum
- Eulophus magnisulcatus
- Eulophus mortuorum
- Eulophus mundus
- Eulophus nebulosa
- Eulophus nemati
- Eulophus neomexicanus
- Eulophus nigritor
- Eulophus nitidulus
- Eulophus orgyiae
- Eulophus orientalis
- Eulophus orsinus
- Eulophus osmiarum
- Eulophus pennicornis
- Eulophus pimpinellae
- Eulophus polycerus
- Eulophus polydrosis
- Eulophus pythodorus
- Eulophus ramicornis
- Eulophus ramosus
- Eulophus razaki
- Eulophus rhamnius
- Eulophus rupicapra
- Eulophus sancus
- Eulophus semicupreus
- Eulophus senegalensis
- Eulophus smerinthi
- Eulophus smerinthicida
- Eulophus stenostigma
- Eulophus stygius
- Eulophus tabidus
- Eulophus tardescens
- Eulophus thespius
- Eulophus trachalus
- Eulophus vagus
- Eulophus velosus
- Eulophus veturius
