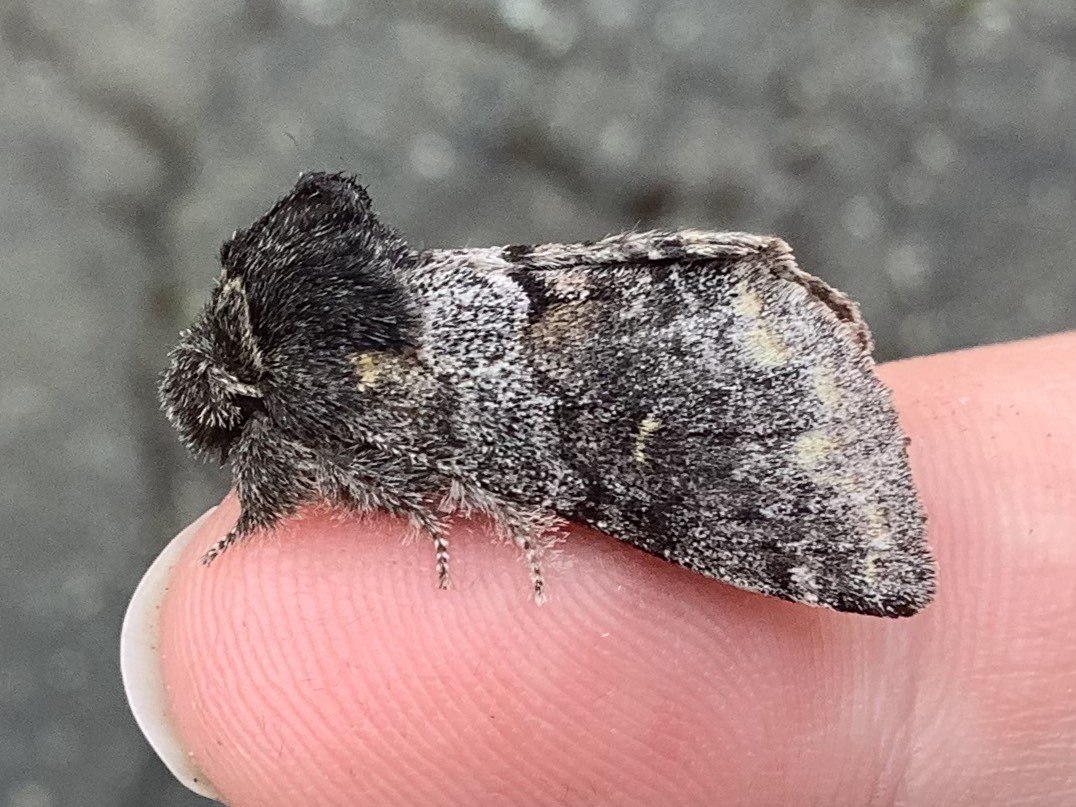

Scientific classification
- Domain: Eukaryota
- Kingdom: Animalia
- Phylum: Arthropoda
- Class: Insecta
- Order: Lepidoptera
- Superfamily: Noctuoidea
- Family: Notodontidae
- Genus: Gluphisia
- Species: G. severa

Binomial name
- Gluphisia severa H. Edwards, 1886

= Gluphisia severa =

Species of moth

Gluphisia severa, the banded pebble, is a species of moth in the family Notodontidae (the prominents). It was first described by Henry Edwards in 1886 and it is found in North America.

The MONA or Hodges number for Gluphisia severa is 7935.
