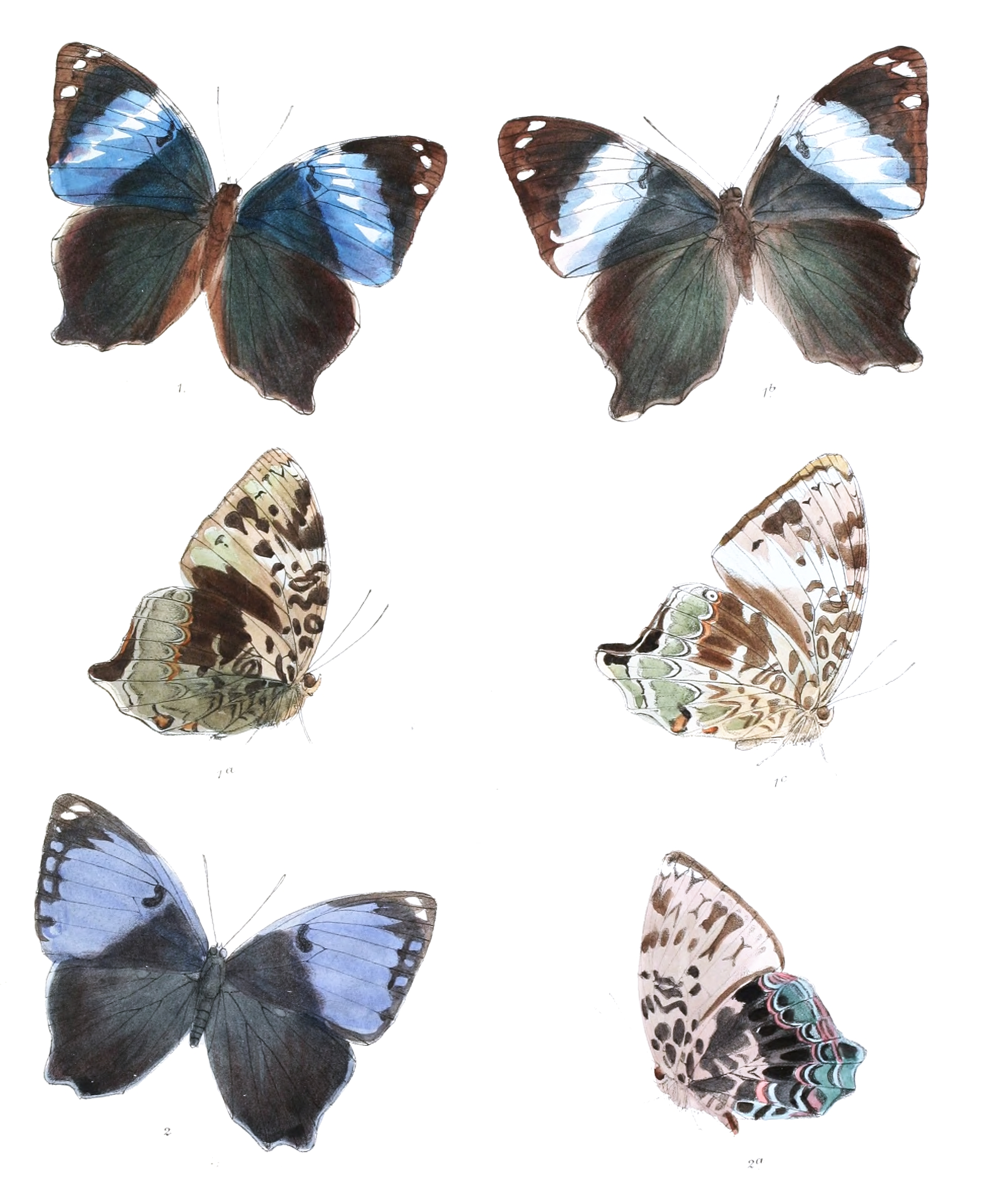
- Prothoe franck

Scientific classification
- Domain: Eukaryota
- Kingdom: Animalia
- Phylum: Arthropoda
- Class: Insecta
- Order: Lepidoptera
- Family: Nymphalidae
- Tribe: Prothoini
- Genus: Prothoe; Hübner, [1824]

Species
- Three, see text

= Prothoe =

Genus of insects

Prothoe is a genus of charaxine butterflies in the family Nymphalidae. Two of the three species are virtually restricted to western and central Melanesia, but the most widespread species, P. franck, occurs throughout a large part of South-East Asia and as far northwest as Assam in India.

== Taxonomy ==
Species in this genus are:

- Prothoe australis (Guérin-Méneville, [1831])
- Prothoe ribbei Rothschild, 1895
- Prothoe franck (Godart, [1824])
