= Gluphisia wrightii =

Scientific classification
- Domain: Eukaryota
- Kingdom: Animalia
- Phylum: Arthropoda
- Class: Insecta
- Order: Lepidoptera
- Superfamily: Noctuoidea
- Family: Notodontidae
- Genus: Gluphisia
- Species: G. wrightii

Binomial name
- Gluphisia wrightii H. Edwards, 1886

Species of moth

Gluphisia wrightii is a species of moth in the family Notodontidae (the prominents). It was first described by Henry Edwards in 1886 and it is found in North America.

The MONA or Hodges number for Gluphisia wrightii is 7932.
