= Eulophus orgyiae =

Scientific classification
- Kingdom: Animalia
- Phylum: Arthropoda
- Clade: Pancrustacea
- Class: Insecta
- Order: Hymenoptera
- Family: Eulophidae
- Genus: Eulophus
- Species: E. orgyiae

Binomial name
- Eulophus orgyiae Fitch, 1856

Synonyms
- List: Comedo orgyiae (Fitch, 1856); Cratotechus orgyiae (Fitch, 1856); Trichogramma orgyiae Fitch, 1856; Tetrastichus orgyiae (Fitch, 1856)

Species of wasp

Eulophus orgyiae is a species of parasitic wasp in the family Eulophidae. It is a parasitoid of certain moths, such as Gluphisia septentrionis and Orthosia hibisci and has been used as a method of biological control to prevent the spread of their larvae and defoliation of their host plants. It can be found throughout the United States and Canada.
