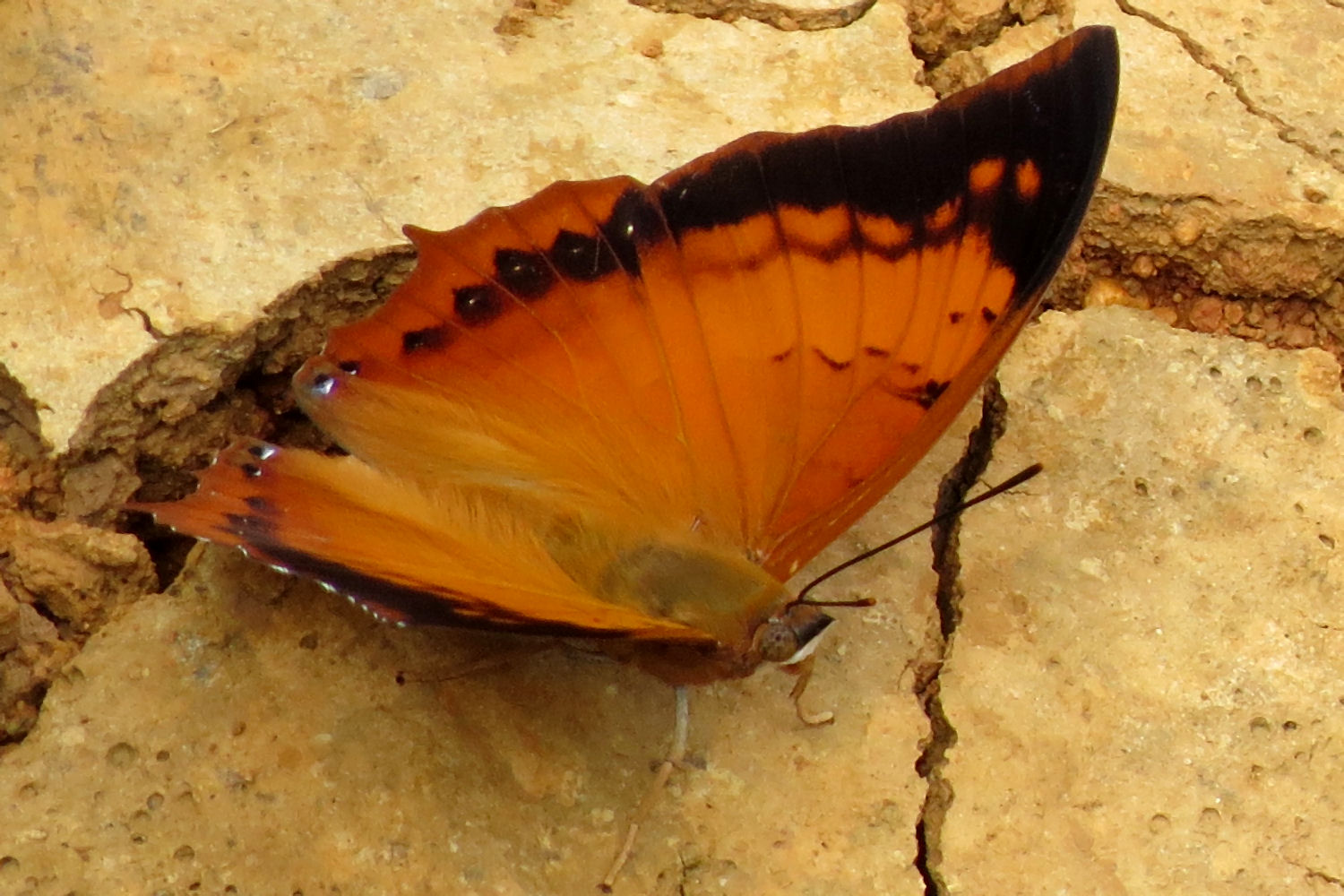
- Upperside
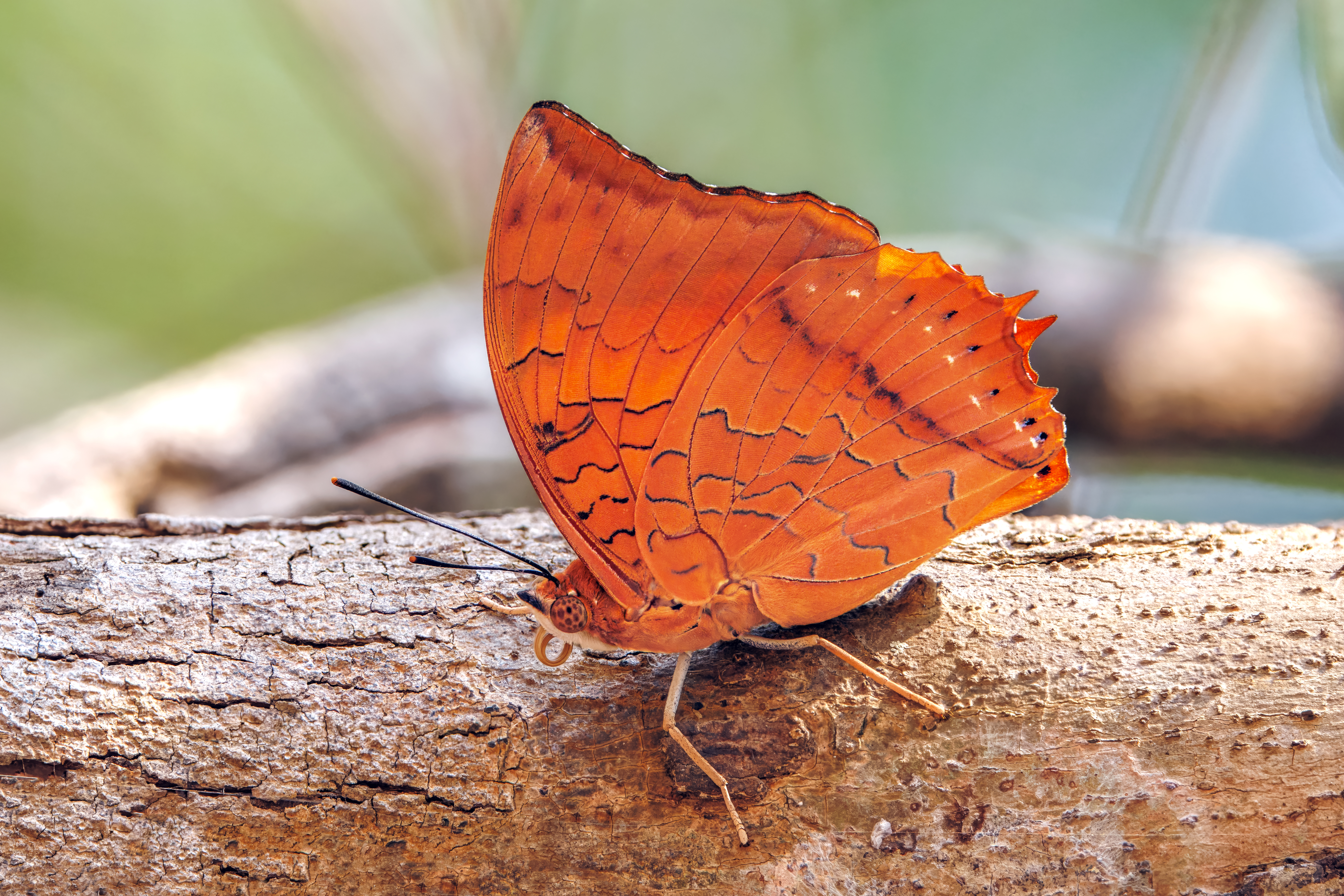
- Underside of male C. b. hierax

Scientific classification
- Kingdom: Animalia
- Phylum: Arthropoda
- Clade: Pancrustacea
- Class: Insecta
- Order: Lepidoptera
- Family: Nymphalidae
- Genus: Charaxes
- Species: C. bernardus

Binomial name
- Charaxes bernardus (Fabricius), 1793

= Charaxes bernardus =

Tawny rajah

Species of butterfly

Charaxes bernardus, the tawny rajah, is a butterfly that belongs to the rajahs and nawabs group, that is, the Charaxinae group of the brush-footed butterflies family. This species can be found in India, China, Indomalaya, and onwards to Indonesia.

== Description ==
Charaxes bernardus has a wingspan of about 7–9 centimetres (2.8–3.5 in). The upperside of wings is reddish brown or pale brown-orange, with dark brown/black speckles at the wings tips and small black marks at the margin of the hindwings. On the underside of the wings there are irregular wavy or tawny brown speckles and whitish zigzag bands. Males and females are very similar in appearance.

== Habits ==
It has been recorded as a migrant in South India and is known to mud-puddle.

== Food plants ==
Known food plants of this species include: Aglaia lawii, Aglaia roxburghiana (Meliaceae), Cinnamomum camphora, Litsea glutinosa, Litsea populifolia (Lauraceae), Sapium sebiferum (Euphorbiaceae), Adenanthera pavonina, Paraserianthes falcataria (= Falcataria moluccana), Tamarindus indica (Leguminosae), and Acronychia penduculata (Rutaceae).

== Subspecies ==
- Charaxes bernardus bernardus – present in China and Hong Kong
- Charaxes bernardus acolus Fruhstorfer – eastern Sumatra
- Charaxes bernardus agna Moore, 1878 – in Thailand and Burma
- Charaxes bernardus ajax Fawcett, 1897 – western Sumatra
- Charaxes bernardus bajula Staudinger, 1889 – Palawan
- Charaxes bernardus baliensis Joicey & Talbot, 1922 – Bali
- Charaxes bernardus basilisae Schröder & Treadaway, 1982 – Philippines
- Charaxes bernardus baya (Moore, 1857) – Java and Bali
- Charaxes bernardus crepax Fruhstorfer, 1914 – Malaysia and Singapore
- Charaxes bernardus cybistia Fruhstorfer
- Charaxes bernardus enganicus Fruhstorfer, 1904
- Charaxes bernardus hainanus Gu, 1994 – Hainan
- Charaxes bernardus hemana Butler, 1870 – Nepal
- Charaxes bernardus hierax C. & R. Felder, [1867] – Assam, Cambodia and southern Yunnan.
- Charaxes bernardus hindia Butler, 1872
- Charaxes bernardus kangeanensis Hanafusa, 1990
- Charaxes bernardus mahawedi Fruhstorfer – northern Indochina
- Charaxes bernardus mirabilis Hanafusa, 1989
- Charaxes bernardus mitschkei Lathy, 1913 – Nias
- Charaxes bernardus phlegontis Fruhstorfer
- Charaxes bernardus repetitus Butler, 1896 – Borneo
- Charaxes bernardus siporanus Hanafusa, 1992
- Charaxes bernardus siporaensis (Hanafusa, 1992)
- Charaxes bernardus varenius Fruhstorfer
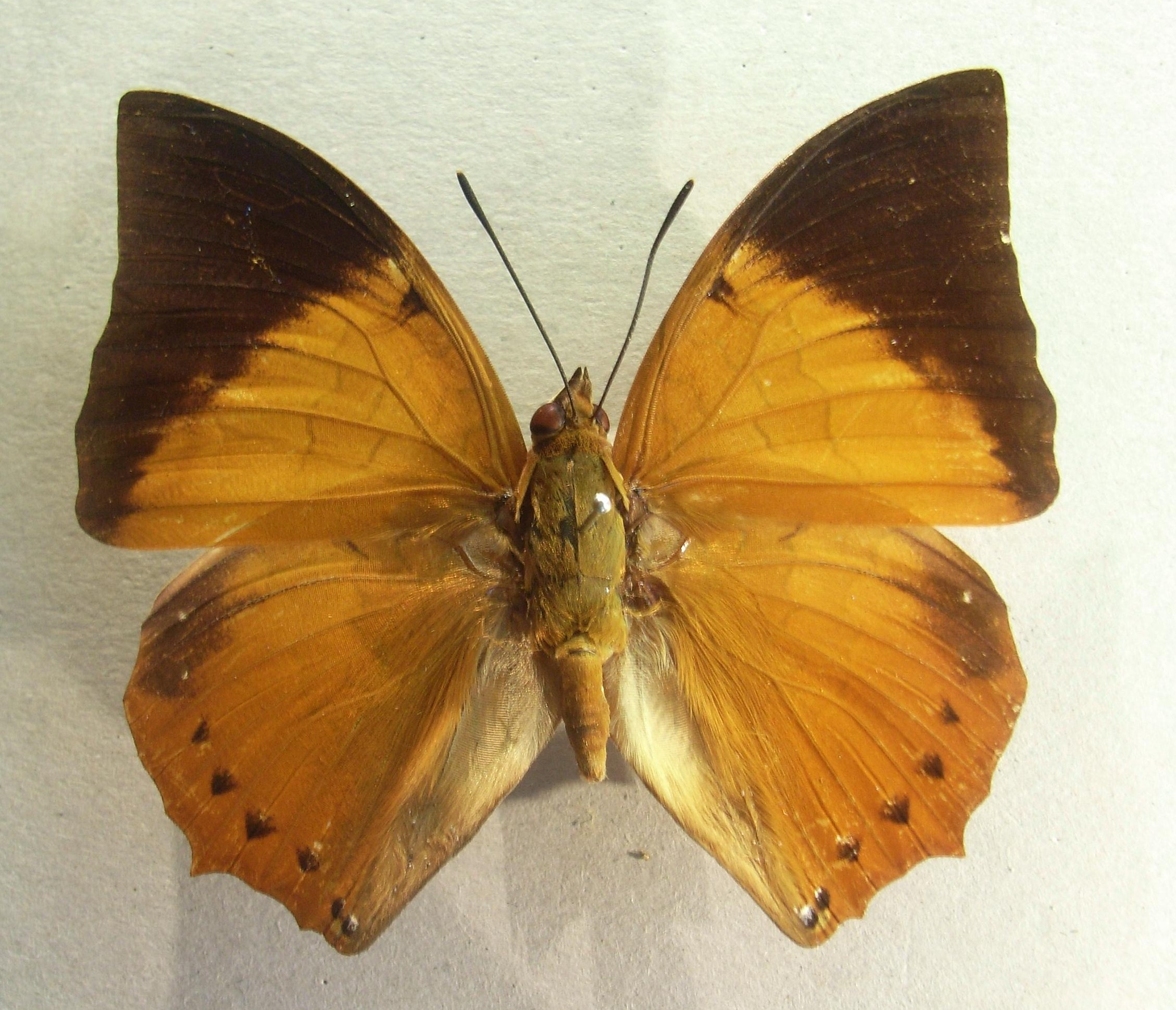
C. b. phlegontis

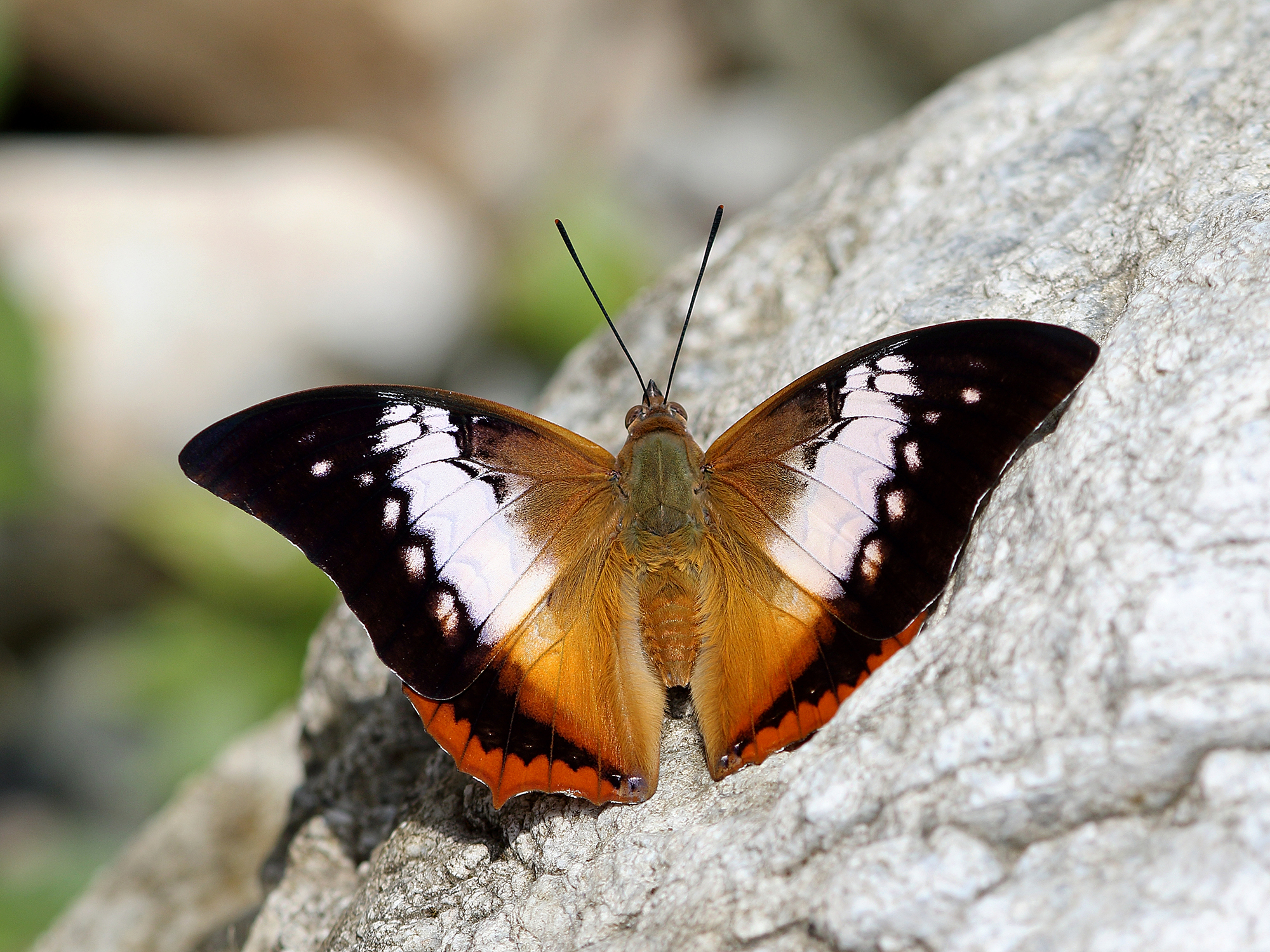
C. b. hierax (upperside)

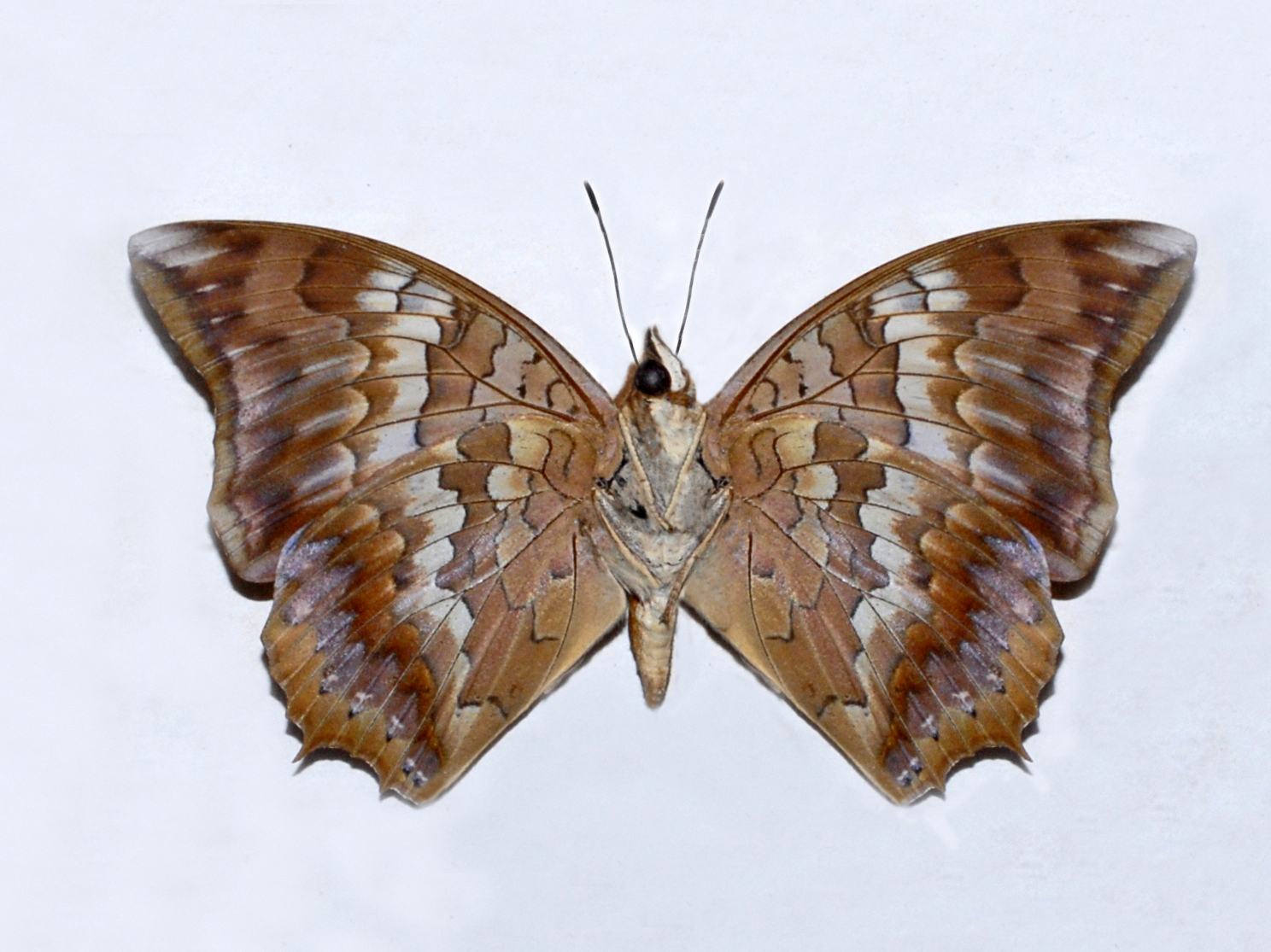
C. b. hierax (underside)

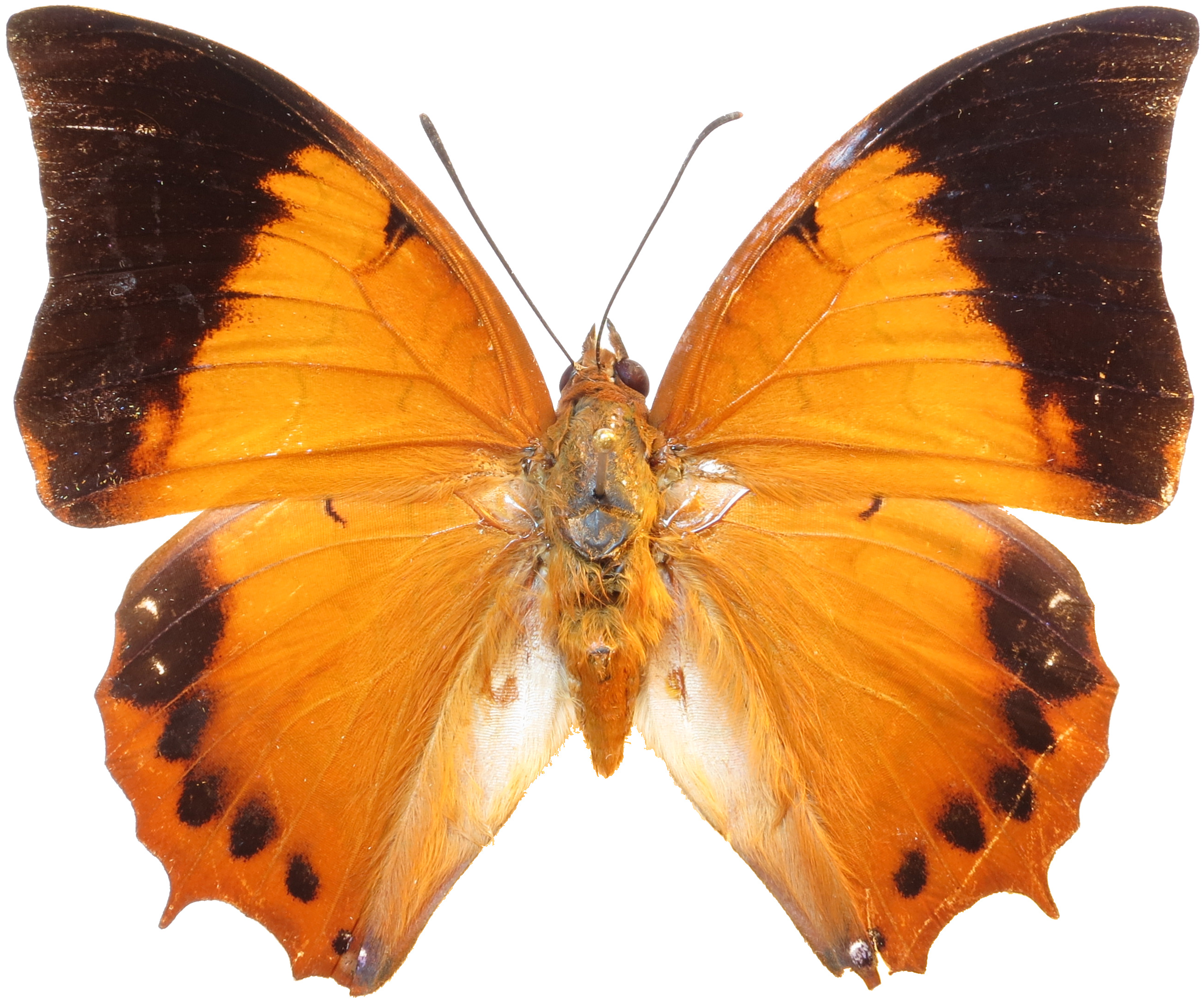
C. b. mahawedi

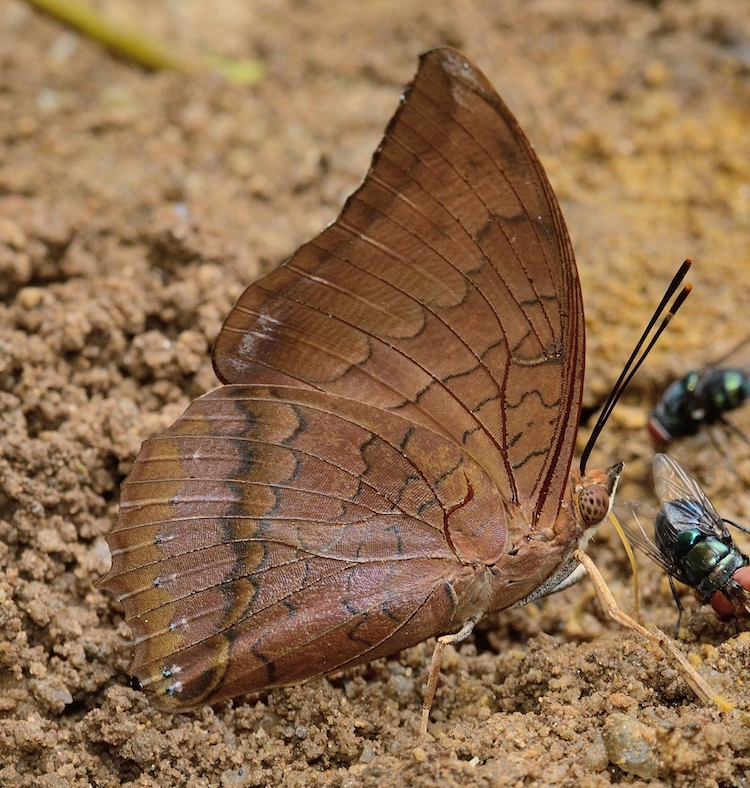
Gua Tempurung, Malaysia

== See also ==
- Charaxinae
- Nymphalidae
- List of butterflies of India
- List of butterflies of India (Nymphalidae)
