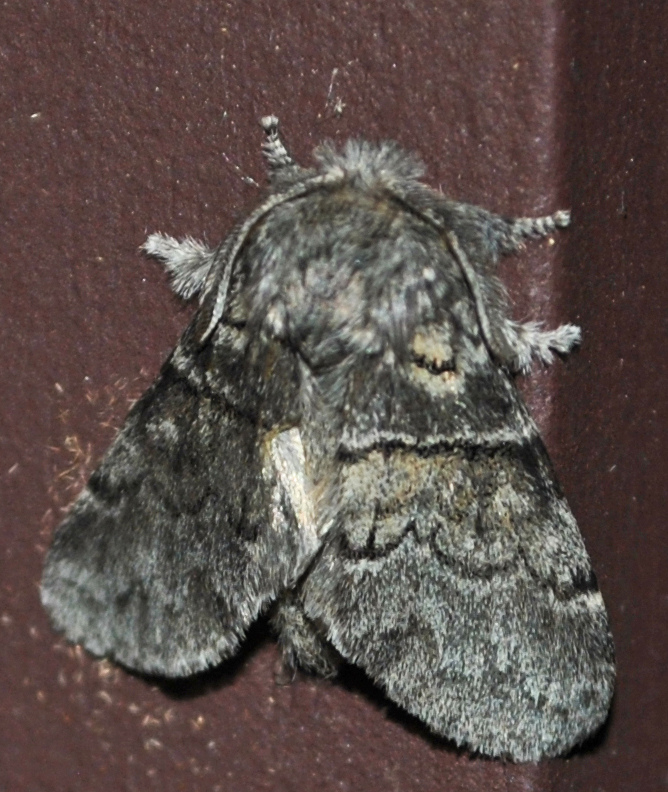
- Gluphisia septentrionis

Scientific classification
- Kingdom: Animalia
- Phylum: Arthropoda
- Clade: Pancrustacea
- Class: Insecta
- Order: Lepidoptera
- Superfamily: Noctuoidea
- Family: Notodontidae
- Tribe: Dicranurini
- Genus: Gluphisia; Boisduval, 1828

Synonyms
- Eumelia Neumoegen, 1893; Ceruridia Dyar, 1893; Glyphidia Agassiz, 1847 (unjust. emend); Melia Neumoegen, 1892 (preocc. Bosc, 1813); Paragluphisia Djakonov, 1927

= Gluphisia =

Genus of moths

Gluphisia is a genus of moths of the family Notodontidae.

== Species ==
- Gluphisia avimacula Hudson, 1891
- Gluphisia crenata (Esper, 1785)
- Gluphisia lintneri (Grote, 1877)
- Gluphisia oxiana (Djakonov, 1927)
- Gluphisia septentrionis (Walker, 1855)
- Gluphisia severa H. Edwards, 1886
- Gluphisia wrightii H. Edwards, 1886
