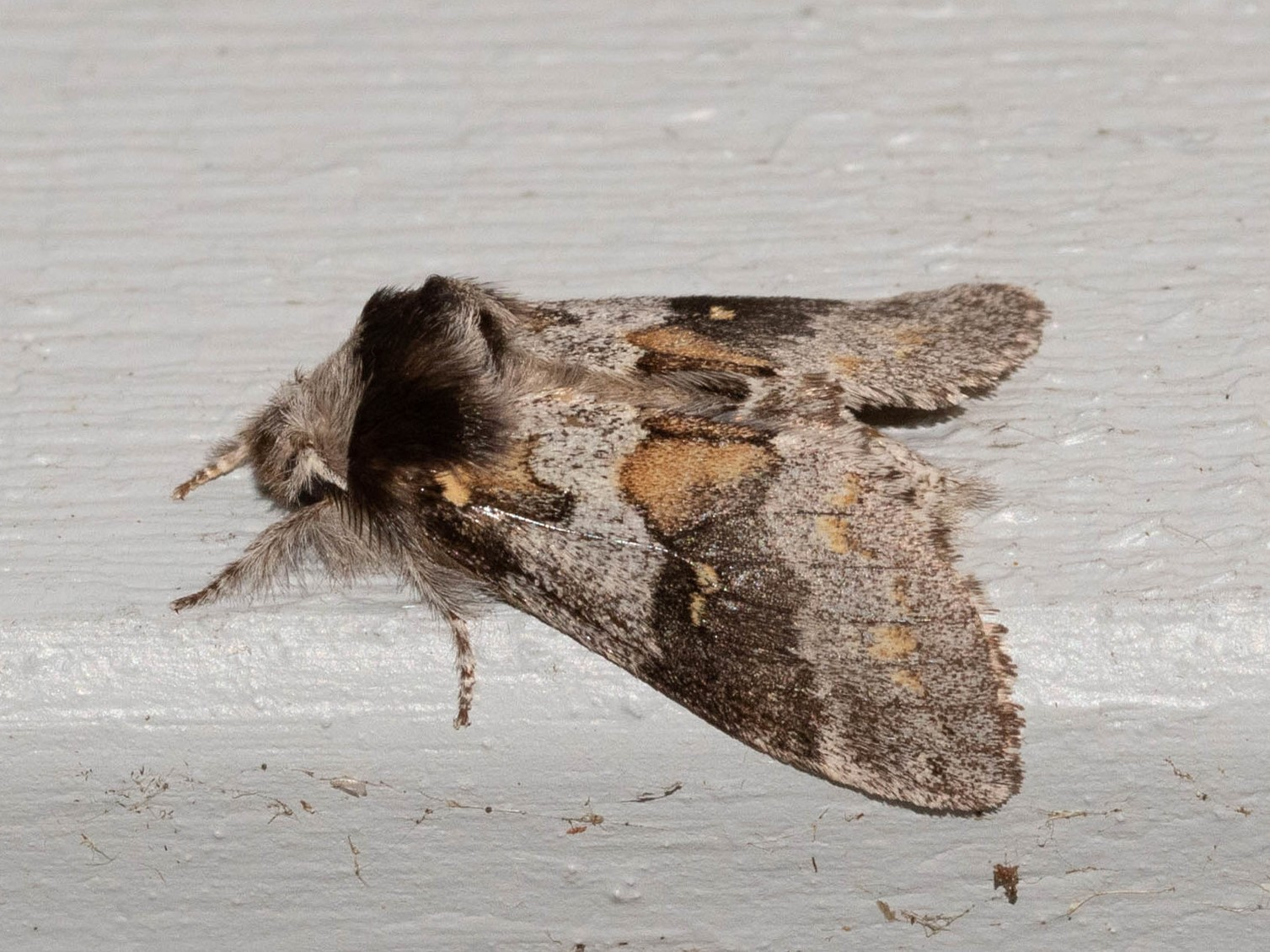

Scientific classification
- Domain: Eukaryota
- Kingdom: Animalia
- Phylum: Arthropoda
- Class: Insecta
- Order: Lepidoptera
- Superfamily: Noctuoidea
- Family: Notodontidae
- Tribe: Dicranurini
- Genus: Gluphisia
- Species: G. avimacula

Binomial name
- Gluphisia avimacula Hudson, 1891

= Gluphisia avimacula =

Species of moth

Gluphisia avimacula, the four-spotted gluphisium or avimacula pebble, is a species of moth in the family Notodontidae (the prominents). It was first described by George H. Hudson in 1891 and it is found in North America.
