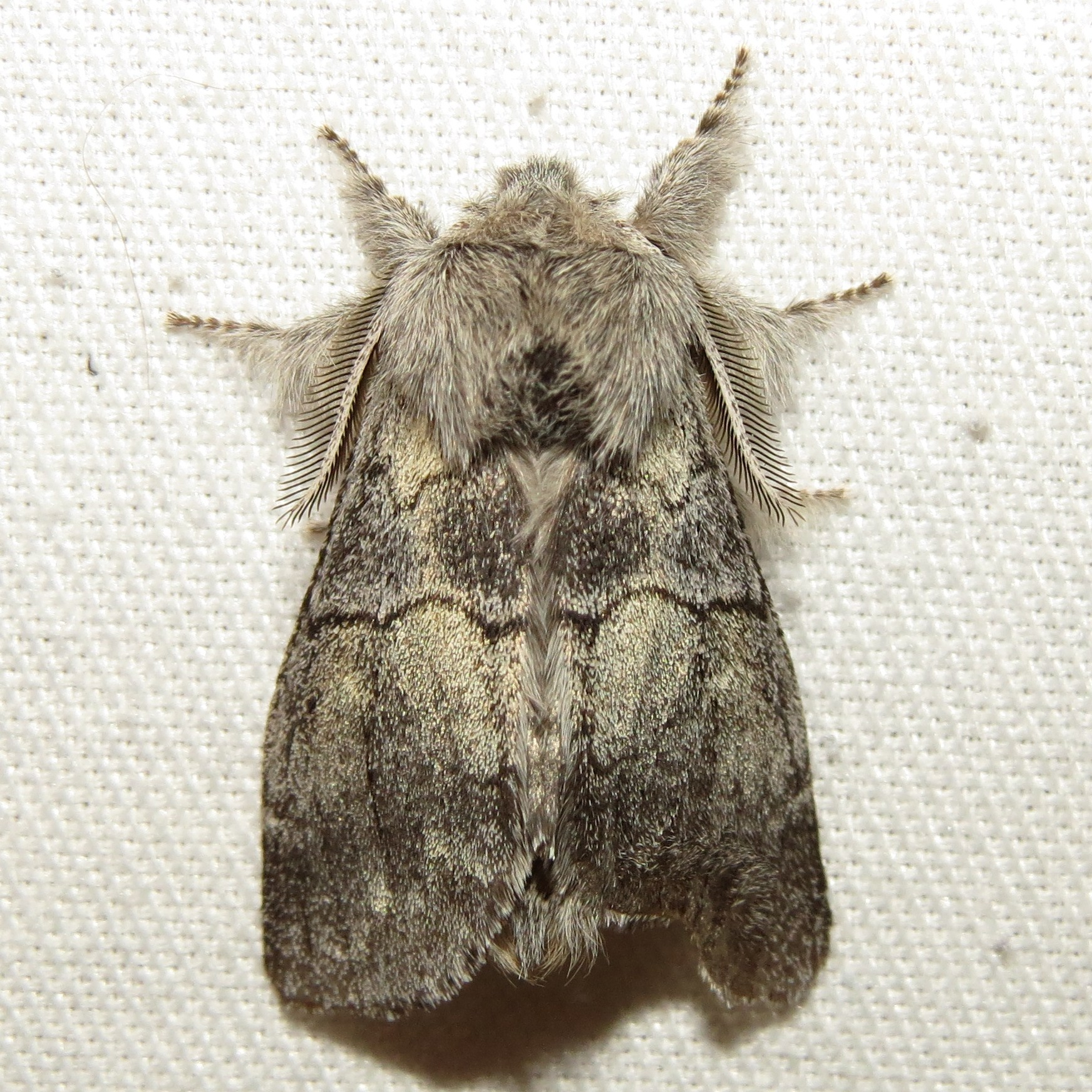

Scientific classification
- Kingdom: Animalia
- Phylum: Arthropoda
- Class: Insecta
- Order: Lepidoptera
- Superfamily: Noctuoidea
- Family: Notodontidae
- Genus: Gluphisia
- Species: G. lintneri

Binomial name
- Gluphisia lintneri (Grote, 1877)

= Gluphisia lintneri =

Species of moth

Gluphisia lintneri, the Lintner's gluphisia moth or Lintner's pebble, is a species of moth in the family Notodontidae (the prominents). It was first described by Augustus Radcliffe Grote in 1877 and it is found in North America.

The MONA or Hodges number for Gluphisia lintneri is 7934.
