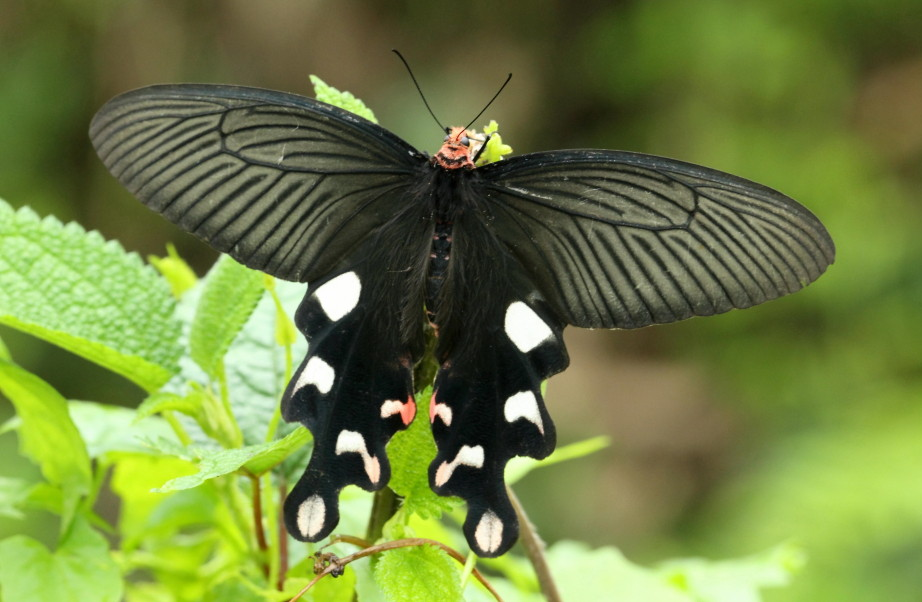
- from Arunachal Pradesh

Scientific classification
- Kingdom: Animalia
- Phylum: Arthropoda
- Class: Insecta
- Order: Lepidoptera
- Family: Papilionidae
- Genus: Byasa
- Species: B. dasarada

Binomial name
- Byasa dasarada (Moore, 1857)

Subspecies
- 5; see text

Synonyms
- Atrophaneura dasarada (Moore, 1857); Papilio dasarada Moore, 1857

= Byasa dasarada =

Great windmill

Species of butterfly

Byasa dasarada, the great windmill, is a large butterfly found in India that belongs to the windmills genus, Byasa, comprising tailed black swallowtail butterflies with white spots and red submarginal crescents.

== Range and status ==
Northern India, Northern Pakistan, Nepal, Bhutan, Myanmar, south-eastern China (including Hainan island (Guangdong province)).

The great windmill is not rare or threatened.

== Subspecies ==
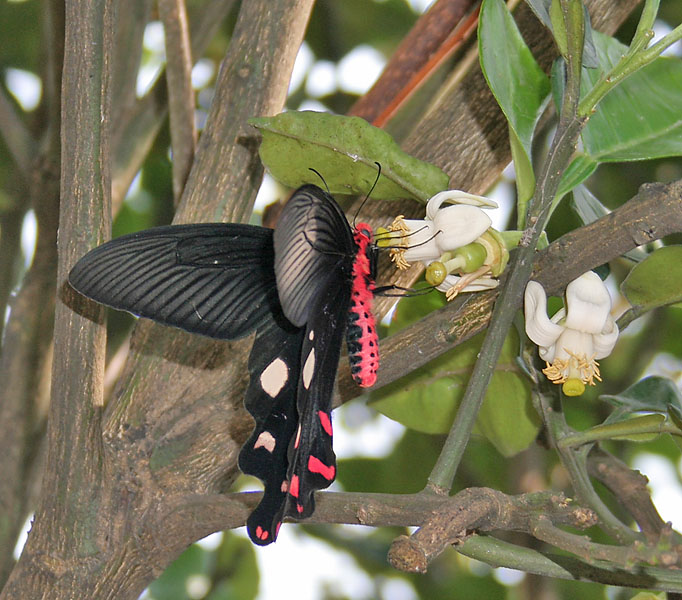
At Samsing in Darjeeling district, West Bengal, India

There are five subspecies. The following occur in the Indian neighbourhood:

- B. d. dasarada Moore. Sikkim to Assam. Not rare.
- B. d. ravana Moore. Kashmir to Kumaon. Not rare.
- B. d. barata Rothschild. Myanmar. Rare.

== Description ==
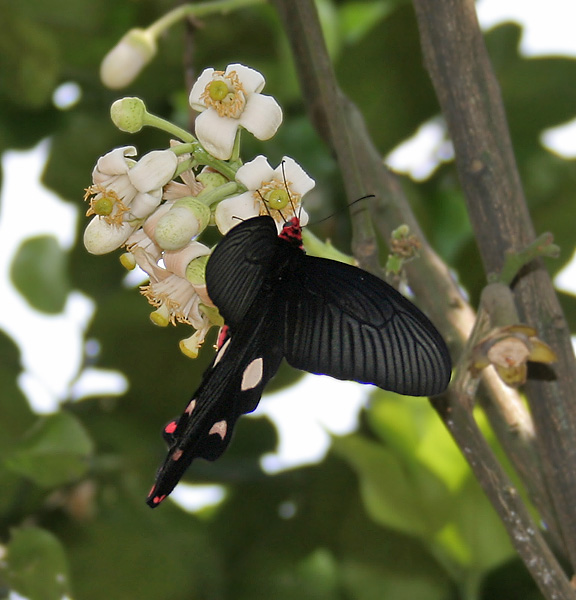
B. d. dasarada at Samsing in Darjeeling district of West Bengal, India

- Wingspan: 100 to 140 mm.
- The butterflies resemble the common windmill but are usually larger with broader tails.
- The upper hindwing marginal crescent is white or cream-coloured.
- Sexes similar. The female often has a complete discal band of white spots on the hindwing.

The butterfly is considered to be beautiful in appearance.

== Habits ==
The great windmill is a woodland butterfly. It can often be spotted slowly and gracefully flying across clearings. It flies between 4,000 and 9,000 feet (1,200 and 2,700 m) in the spring and summer. Its habits resemble those of the common windmill.

== Life cycle ==
=== Egg ===
Not described.

=== Larva ===
The ground colour of the larva varies in shades of grey and has a pattern of black lines. It has an orange osmeterium. The larva has a large number of tubercles arranged in two lateral and two sub-dorsal rows. The third and fourth segments have an additional pair of tubercles. The tubercles all have red tips, except those on the seventh and eighth segments which are almost entirely dirty white and the eleventh segment which has the same colour on just the tips of the tubercles.

=== Pupa ===
Pupa is yellow green with blue bands. It has an orange protuberance on its back. It is attached to its support by a black body and anal pad. The pupa emits a squeak when touched.

== Food plant ==
- Aristolochia griffithi

== Gallery ==
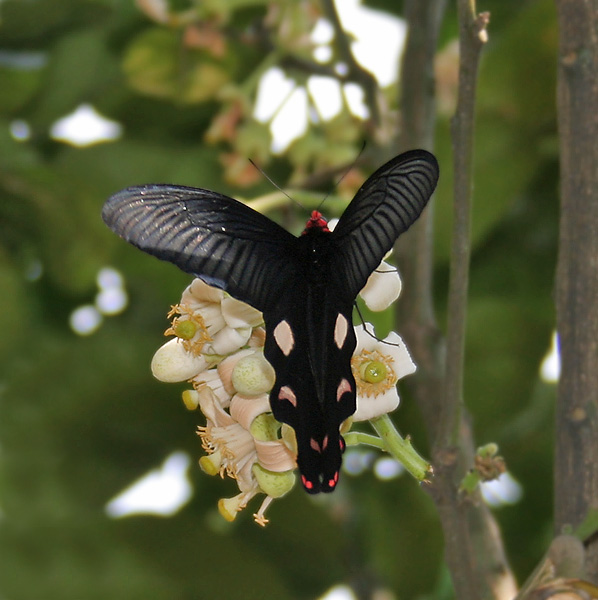
B. d. dasarada at Samsing in Darjeeling district of West Bengal, India

== See also ==
- Byasa
- Papilionidae
- List of butterflies of India
- List of butterflies of India (Papilionidae)
