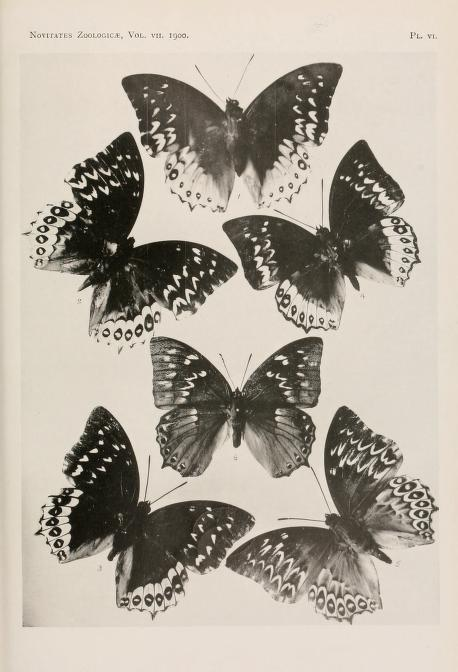
- Figs. 1-5 Novitates Zoologicae

Scientific classification
- Kingdom: Animalia
- Phylum: Arthropoda
- Class: Insecta
- Order: Lepidoptera
- Family: Nymphalidae
- Genus: Charaxes
- Species: C. durnfordi

Binomial name
- Charaxes durnfordi Distant, 1884

= Charaxes durnfordi =

Chestnut rajah

Species of butterfly

Charaxes durnfordi, the chestnut rajah, is a butterfly found in India that belongs to the rajahs and nawabs group, that is, the Charaxinae group of the brush-footed butterflies family.

== Description ==
Male upperside brown, the basal third of fore and nearly the basal half of the hindwing chestnut-brown, the remainder of the forewing dark brown, of the hindwing white suffused inwardly with pale greenish yellow. Forewing with a very incomplete discal and a more complete postdiscal transverse series of more or less crescentic white markings, followed by a few terminal white specks. Hindwing: the inner margin of the white area irregularly and deeply crenulate, the brown on the basal half projecting along the veins into the white area; a sub-terminal row of white-centred brown ocelli without outer rings, increasing in size anteriorly, and a terminal series, often absent, of slender sagittate brown markings on the veins, the points outwards, followed by an anteciliary exceedingly slender brown line. Cilia, forewing and hindwing, white alternated with brown. Underside. purplish brown; a broad discal irregular black-edged darker purple-brown sinuous band across both wings, paler on the hindwing than on the fore, followed by a more or less continuous line of dark lunules, and beyond it a postdiscal series of slightly yellowish-brown lunular markings, bordered outwardly on forewing by pale purple, on hindwing by the series of ocelli of the upperside showing faintly through. Antennae blackish brown finely annulated with white; head, thorax and abdomen chestnut-brown; purplish brown beneath.

== Range ==
Myanmar and parts of Southeast Asia.

== See also ==
- Charaxinae
- Nymphalidae
- List of butterflies of India
- List of butterflies of India (Nymphalidae)
