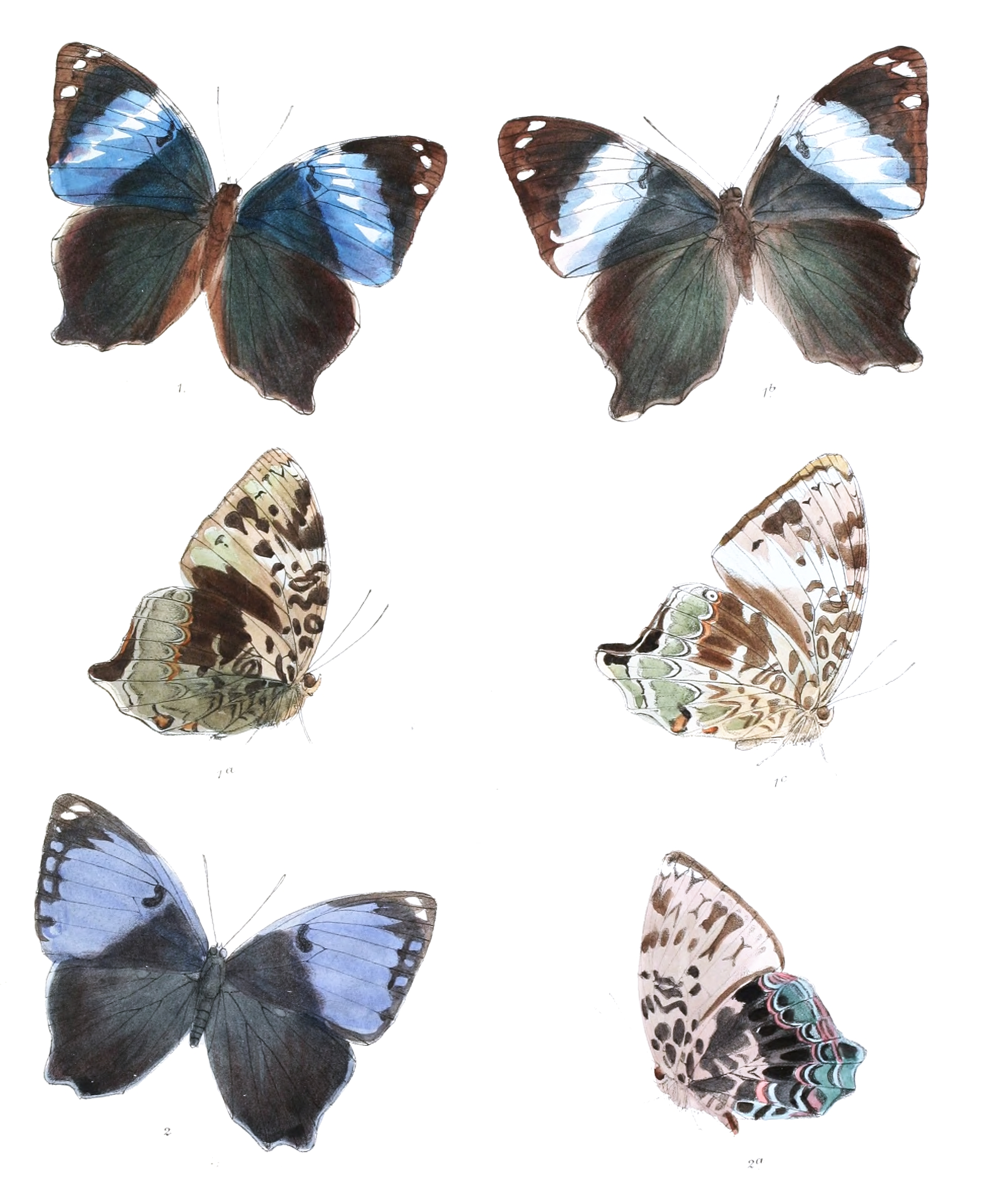

Scientific classification
- Kingdom: Animalia
- Phylum: Arthropoda
- Clade: Pancrustacea
- Class: Insecta
- Order: Lepidoptera
- Family: Nymphalidae
- Genus: Prothoe
- Species: P. franck

Binomial name
- Prothoe franck (Godart, 1824)

= Prothoe franck =

Blue begum

Species of butterfly

Prothoe franck, the blue begum, is a butterfly species found in Assam in north-eastern India and throughout a large part of South-East Asia.

It belongs to the leafwings (Charaxinae) in the brush-footed butterflies family.
