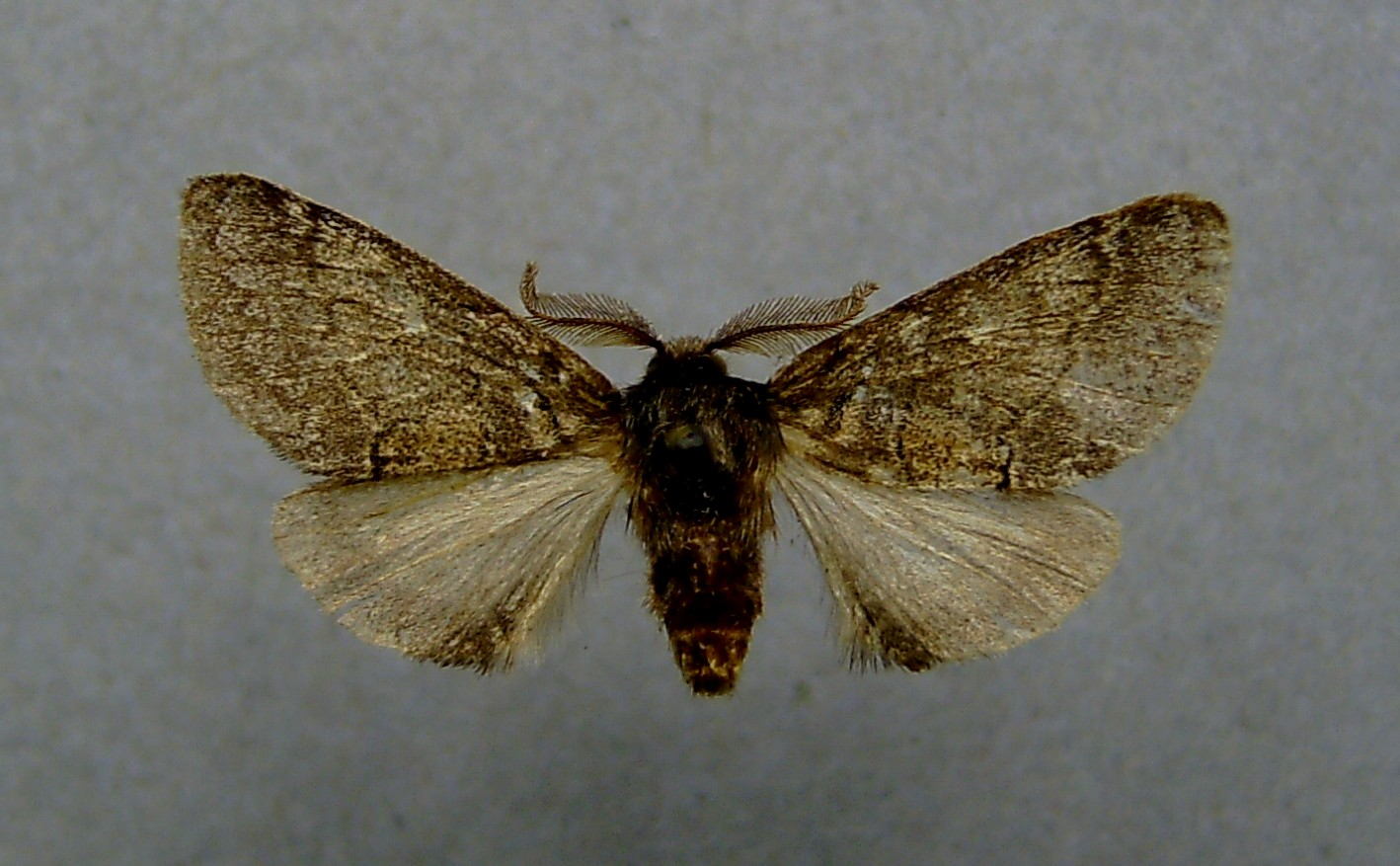

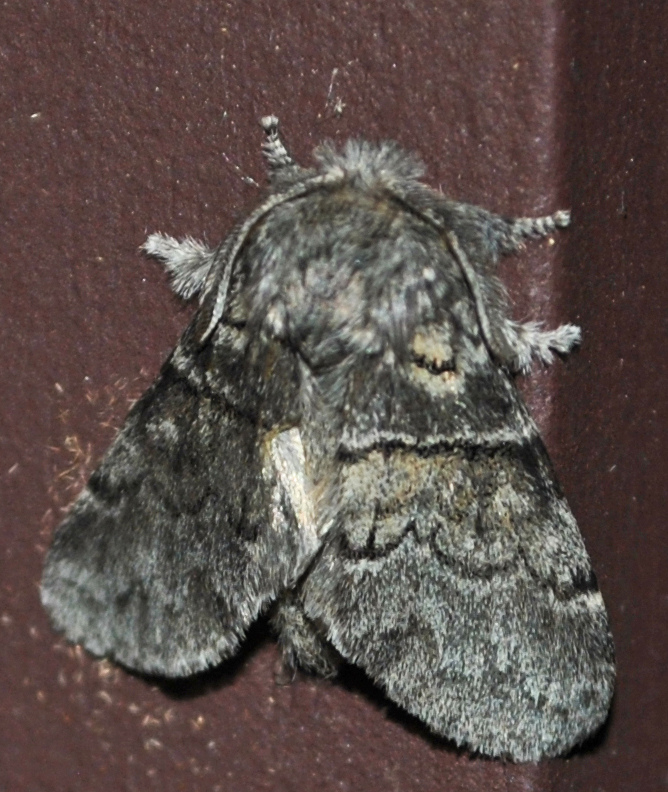

Scientific classification
- Kingdom: Animalia
- Phylum: Arthropoda
- Clade: Pancrustacea
- Class: Insecta
- Order: Lepidoptera
- Superfamily: Noctuoidea
- Family: Notodontidae
- Genus: Gluphisia
- Species: G. crenata

Binomial name
- Gluphisia crenata (Esper, 1785)

Synonyms
- List: Bombyx crenata Esper, 1785; Gluphisia rurea Fabricius, 1787; Bombyx crenosa Hubner, 1796; Gluphisia crenata danieli Kobes, 1970; Gluphisia septentrionis Walker, 1855; Dasychira clandestina Walker, 1861; Gluphisia trilineata Packard, 1864; Gluphisia ridenda Edwards, 1886; Gluphisia formosa Edwards, 1886; Gluphisia albofascia Edwards, 1886; Gluphisia rupta Edwards, 1886; Gluphisia quinquelinea Dyar, 1892; Gluphisia japonica Wileman, 1911; Gluphisia crenata ab. amurensis Grunberg, 1912; Gluphisia crenata ab. tartarus Schawerda, 1919; Gluphisia crenata ab. vertunea Derenne, 1920; Gluphisia crenata ab. infuscata Matsumura, 1924; Gluphisia septentrionis f. opaca Barnes & Benjamin, 1927; Gluphisia crenata ab. albina Lucas, 1955; Gluphisia crenata f. variegata Lempke, 1959

= Gluphisia crenata =

Dusky marbled brown

Species of moth

Gluphisia crenata, the dusky marbled brown, is a moth of the family Notodontidae. The species was first described by Eugenius Johann Christoph Esper in 1785. It is found in Europe, east over parts of Russia and China up to Japan. It is also found in North America, where it was traditionally treated as a separate species, Gluphisia septentrionis.

The wingspan is 28–34 mm. The moth flies from April to August in two generations depending on the location.

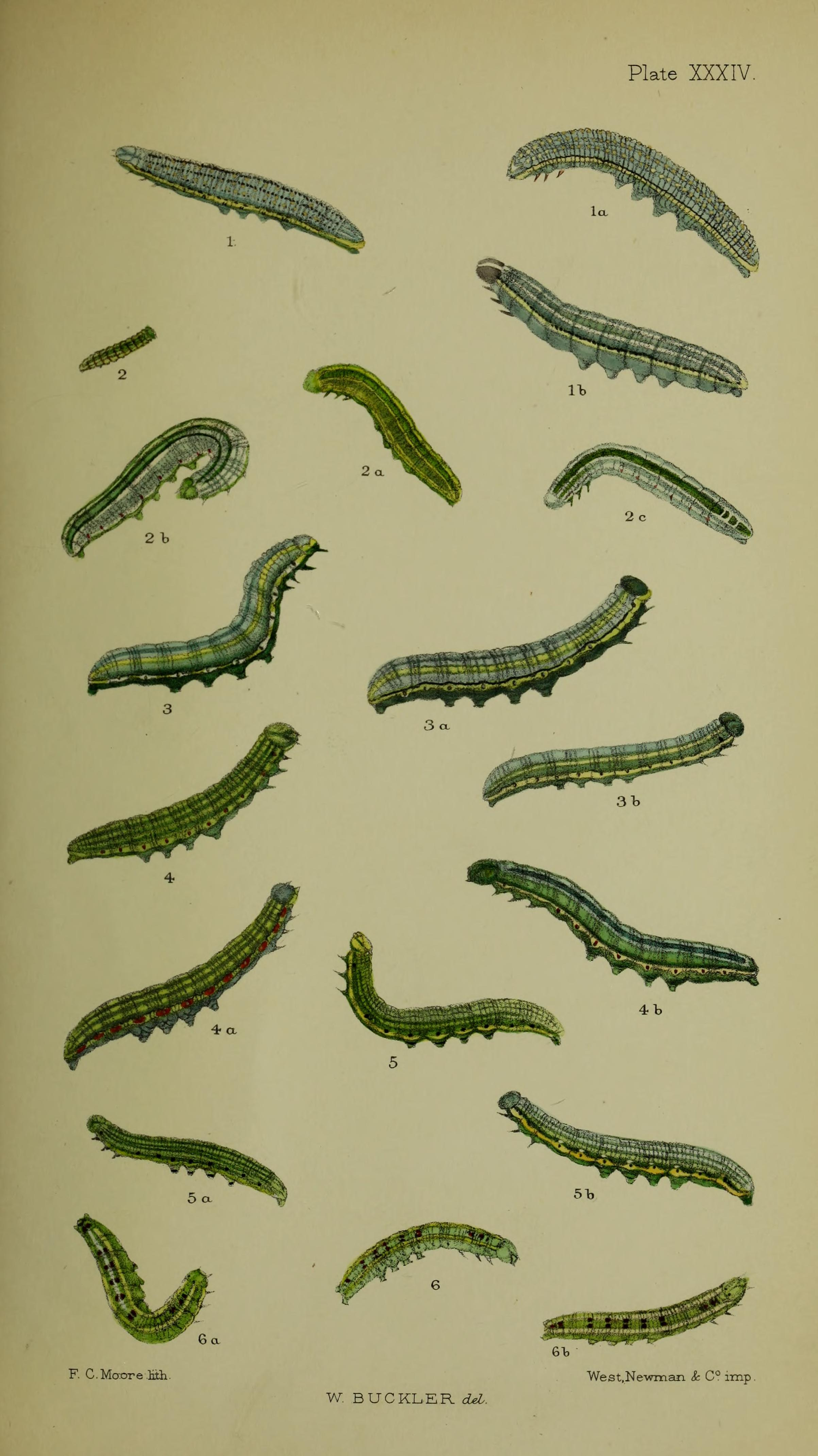
6, 6a. 6b larvae after last molt

The larvae feed on Populus species, such as P. nigra, P. balsamifera and P. tremula, but also on Salix purpurea.

Gluphisia crenata exhibit a puddling behavior, sucking up fluid from puddles, pumping it through the digestive tract, and excreting it at 3 second intervals.

== Subspecies ==
- Gluphisia crenata crenata
- Gluphisia crenosa crenosa (Hubner, 1796)
- Gluphisia crenata tristis Gaede, 1933 (China: Sichuan)
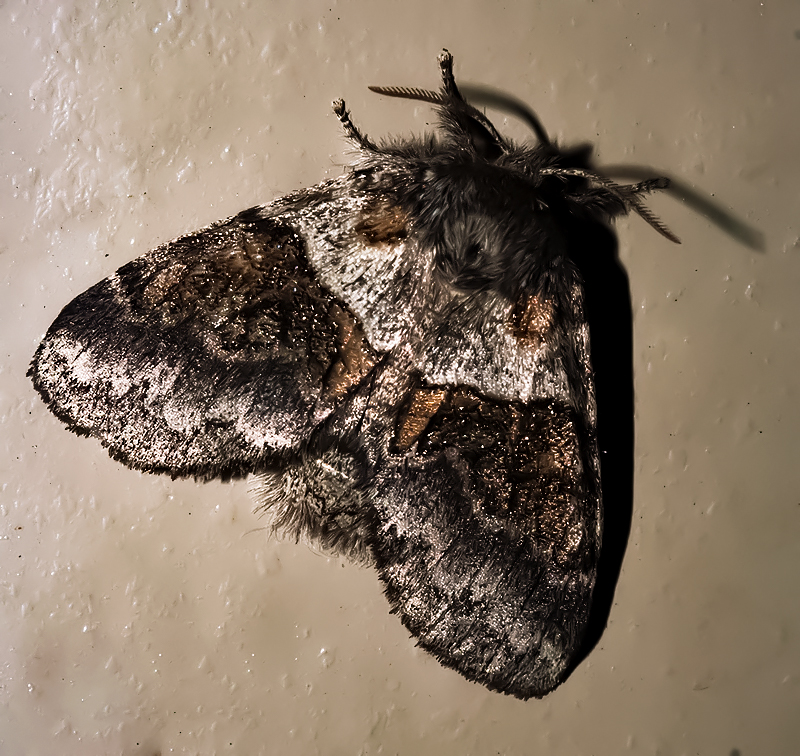
- Common Gluphisia Moth
  Gluphisia crenata meridionalis Kiriakoff, 1964 (China: Yunnan)
