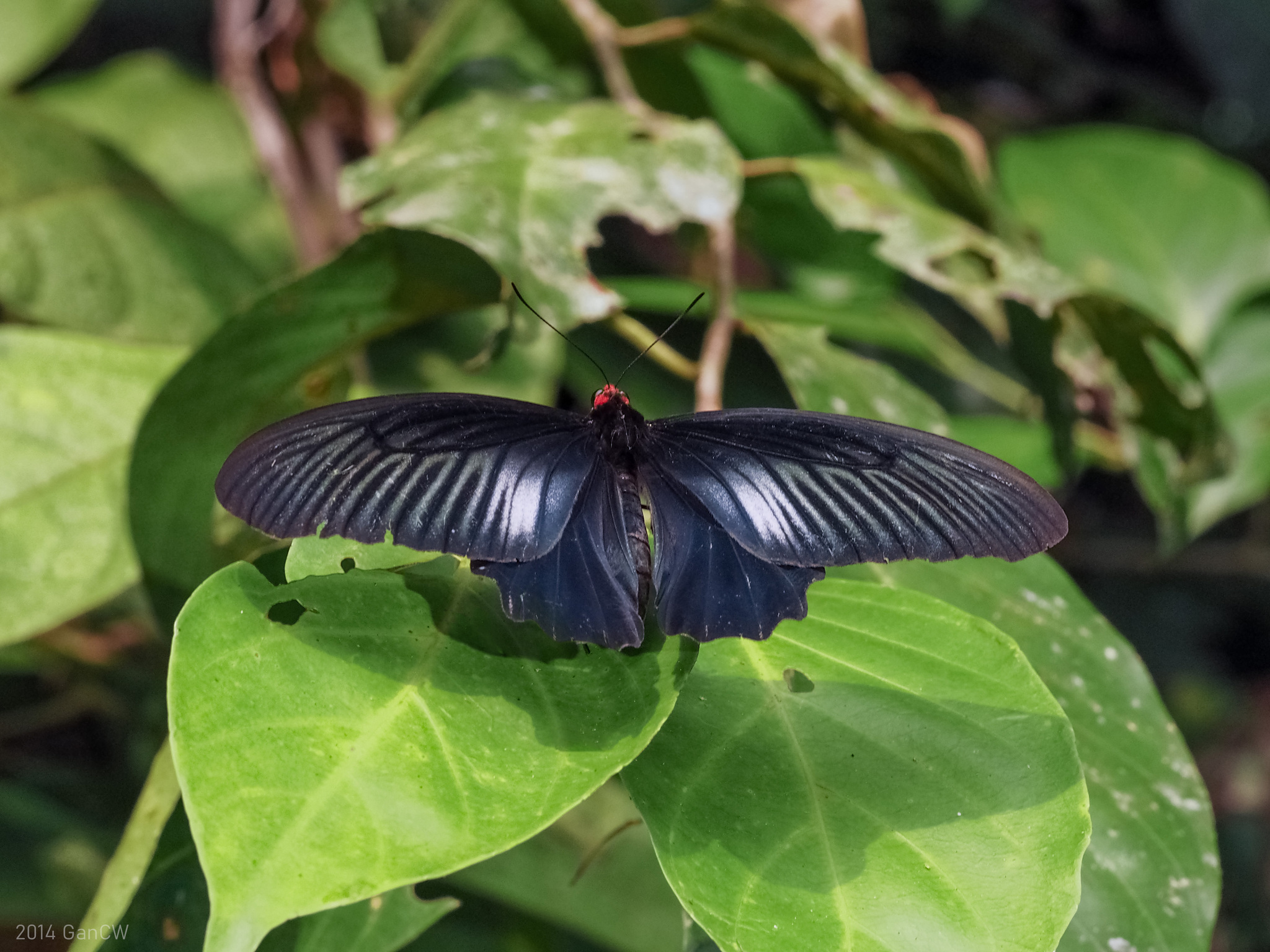
- Upperside
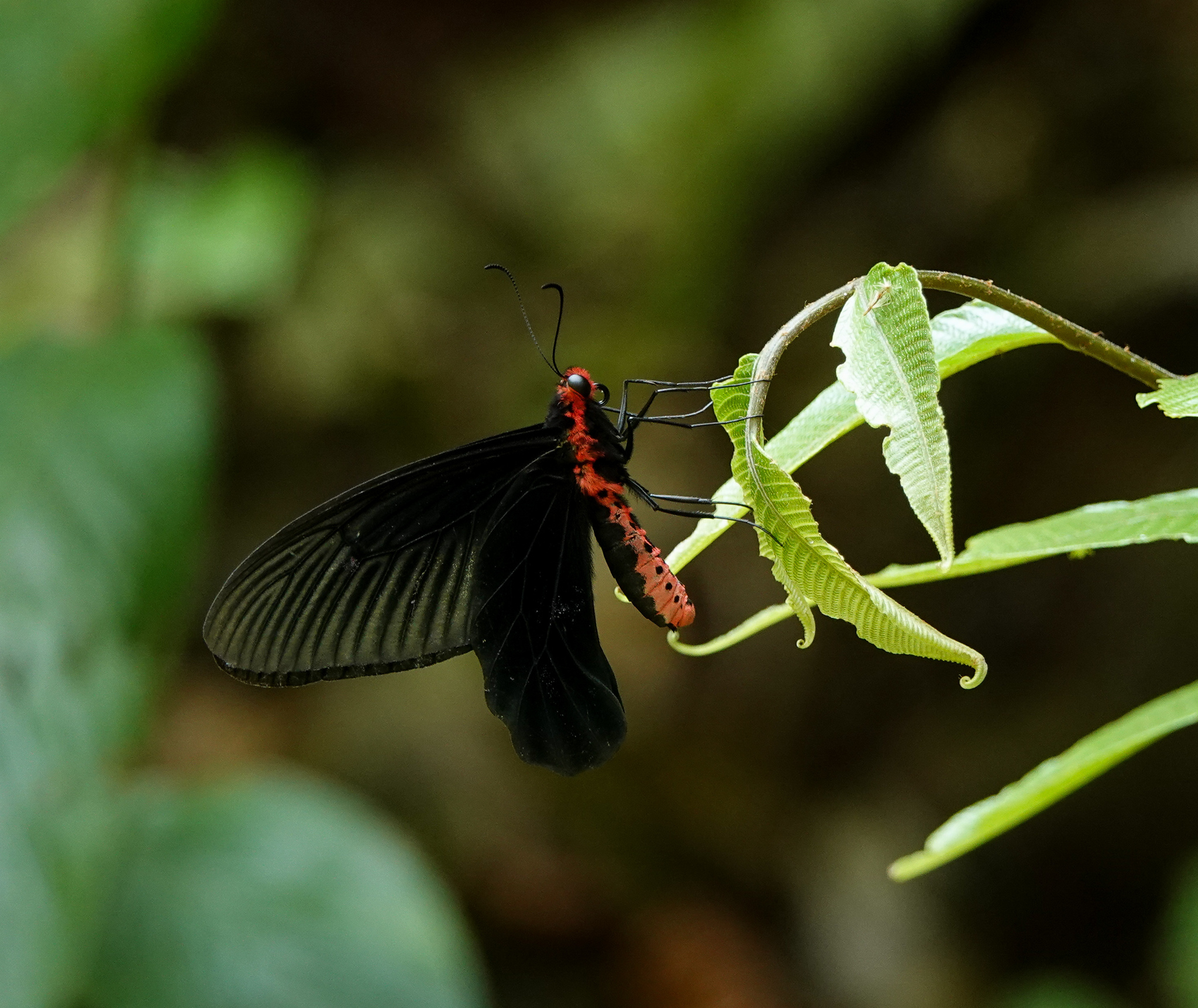
- Underside

Scientific classification
- Kingdom: Animalia
- Phylum: Arthropoda
- Clade: Pancrustacea
- Class: Insecta
- Order: Lepidoptera
- Family: Papilionidae
- Subfamily: Papilioninae
- Tribe: Troidini
- Genus: Atrophaneura
- Species: A. astorion

Binomial name
- Atrophaneura astorion (Westwood, 1842)

Synonyms
- Atrophaneura varuna astorion

= Atrophaneura astorion =

Species of butterfly

Atrophaneura astorion, also known as the common batwing, is a butterfly in the family Papilionidae. It is found from Uttarakhand in India to Singapore.

== Description ==
The wings are spotless and are blue-black in colour. The head, sides of neck and the thorax is crimson in colour. This species is best separated from Atrophaneura aidoneus by the colour of the dorsal wing folds.

== Subspecies ==
There are three recognized subspecies -

- Atrophaneura astorion astorion (Westwood, 1842) - Bangladesh, India (Uttarakhand, Sikkim) [in some schemes also Vietnam, Laos, Cambodia, even China (Hainan)]
- Atrophaneura astorion varuna (White, 1842) - Thailand, Malaysia (Malay Peninsula), Singapore
- Atrophaneura astorion zaleucus (Hewitson, 1865) - Myanmar, Thailand, Laos
