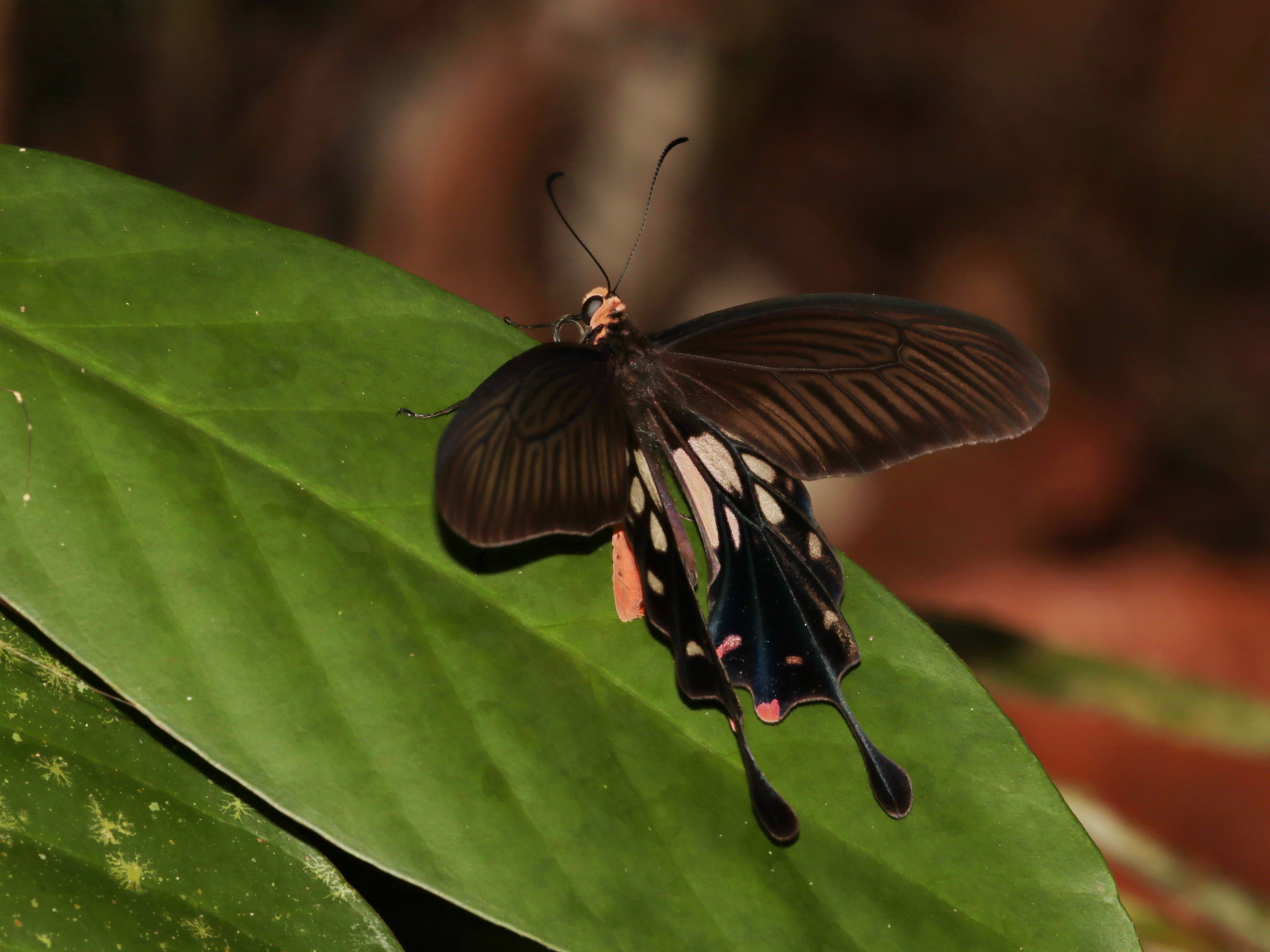
- Upperside
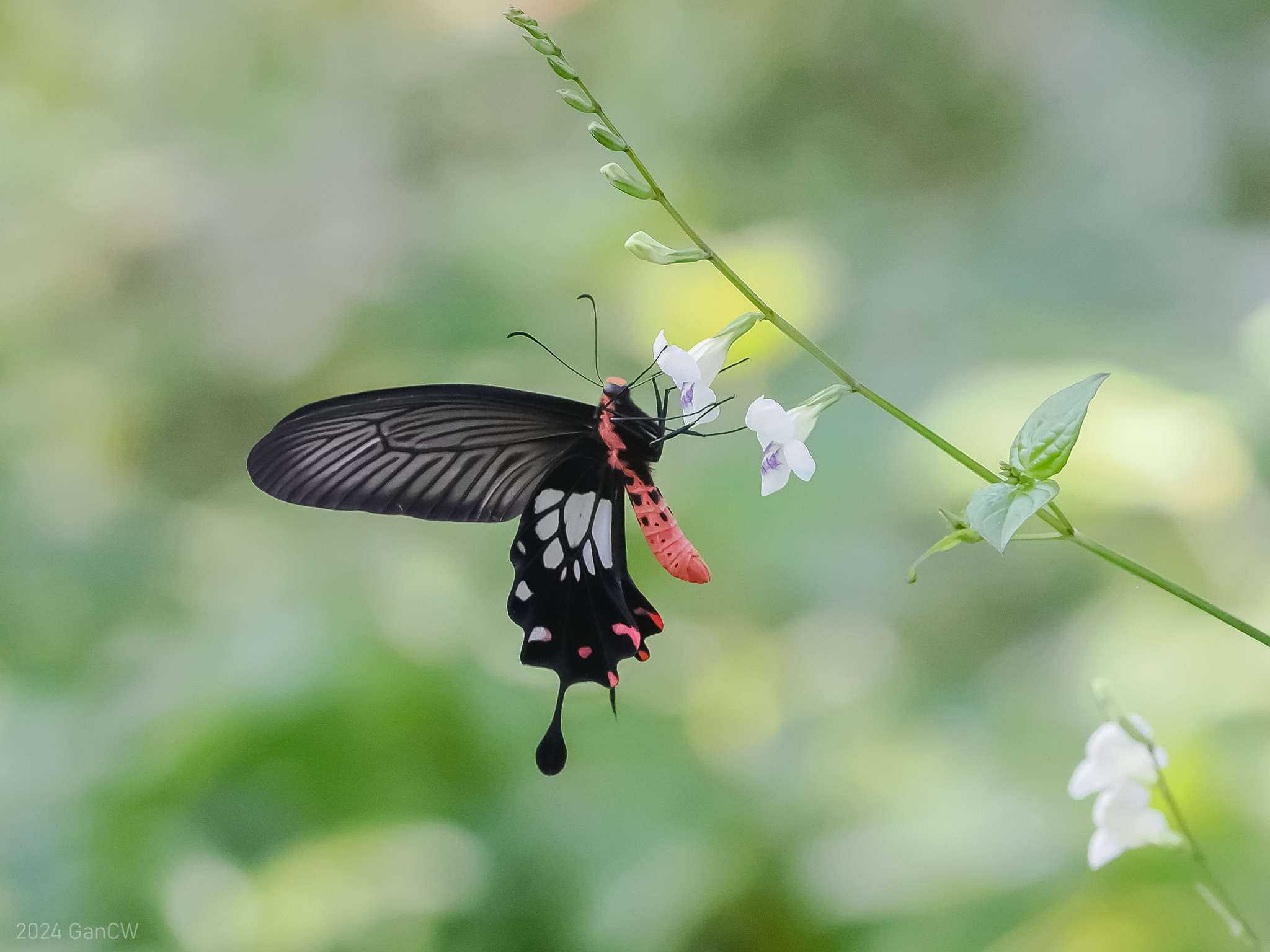
- Underside

Scientific classification
- Kingdom: Animalia
- Phylum: Arthropoda
- Clade: Pancrustacea
- Class: Insecta
- Order: Lepidoptera
- Family: Papilionidae
- Subfamily: Papilioninae
- Tribe: Troidini
- Genus: Losaria
- Species: L. doubledayi

Binomial name
- Losaria doubledayi Wallace, 1865

= Losaria doubledayi =

Species of butterfly

Losaria doubledayi, the red-marked clubtail, is a butterfly in the family Papilionidae. It is found from North-east India to the Malay Peninsula.

== Description ==
The upperside is similar to Losaria coon, but the base is darker. The underside is broader than coon and has the white spot in the cell toothed below. The rings on the abdomen are red instead of yellow, hence giving its common name.

== Subspecies ==
There are six recognized subspecies -

- Losaria doubledayi cacharensis (Butler, 1885) - Northeast India
- Losaria doubledayi putaoa (Tytler, 1939) - North Myanmar
- Losaria doubledayi sambilanga (Doherty, 1886) - Nicobar Islands
- Losaria doubledayi delianus (Fruhstorfer, 1895) - Sumatra
- Losaria doubledayi doubledayi (Wallace, 1865) - Southeast Asia
- Losaria doubledayi insperatus (Joicey and Talbot, 1921) - Hainan
