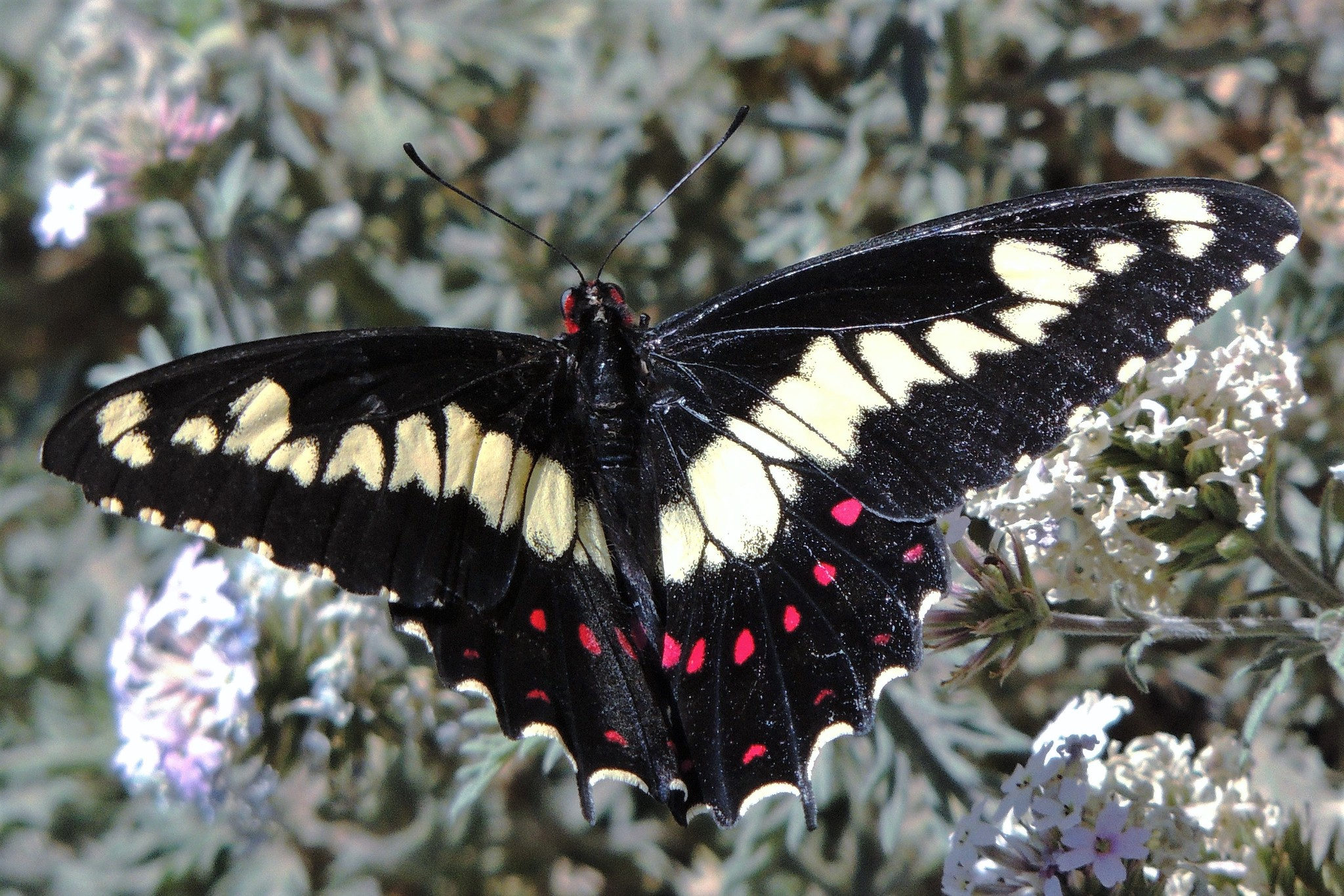

Conservation status
- Near Threatened (IUCN 3.1)

Scientific classification
- Kingdom: Animalia
- Phylum: Arthropoda
- Clade: Pancrustacea
- Class: Insecta
- Order: Lepidoptera
- Family: Papilionidae
- Genus: Euryades
- Species: E. duponchelii

Binomial name
- Euryades duponchelii (H. Lucas, 1839)

Synonyms
- Papilio duponchelii H. Lucas, 1839; Euryades reevii Westwood, 1872

= Euryades duponchelii =

Species of butterfly

Euryades duponchelii is a species of butterfly from the family Papilionidae first described by Hippolyte Lucas in 1839. It is found in Brazil, Argentina, Paraguay, Uruguay, and Bolivia. It is a woodland species and not threatened.

Euryades duponchelii unlike Euryades corethrus is tailed. The male is velvety black, with a yellow band of large patches in the middle and on the hindwing also two rows of red spots, of which the submarginal row is only indicated above. The female is yellow brown, black distally and in the cell of the forewing, the macular band above is only indicated by two subcostal patches, which are situated on the forewing; the red spots of the hindwing above are vivid red. The under surface for the most part is grey yellow.

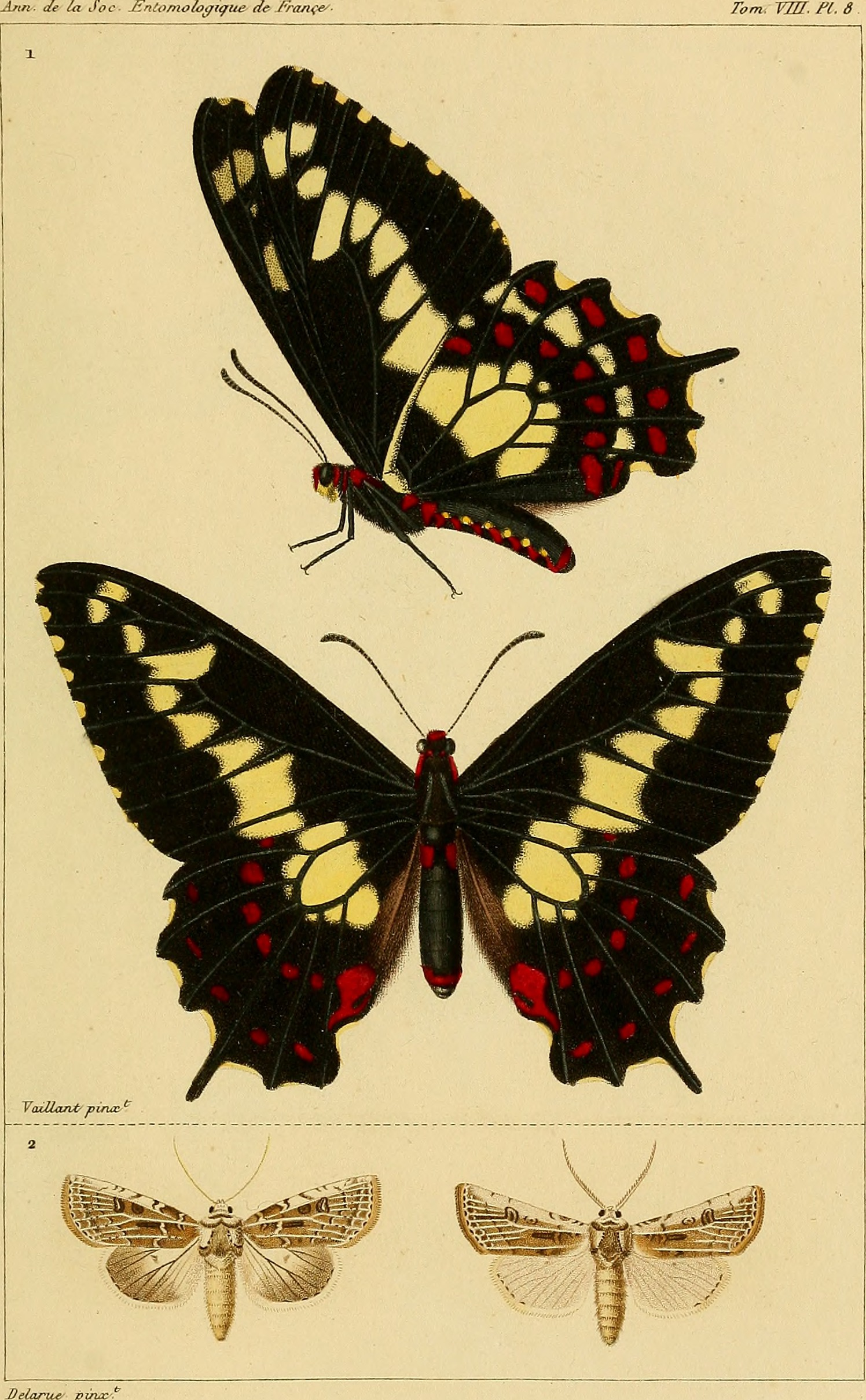
Annales de la Société entomologique de France (1839)

The larvae feed on Aristolochia species.

The two species in the genus Euryades are more closely related to the Australasian clearwing swallowtail (Cressida cressida) than to other South American Papilionidae with larvae that feed on Aristolochia.
