= Aristolochia meridionalis =

Scientific classification
- Kingdom: Plantae
- Clade: Embryophytes
- Clade: Tracheophytes
- Clade: Spermatophytes
- Clade: Angiosperms
- Clade: Magnoliids
- Order: Piperales
- Family: Aristolochiaceae
- Genus: Aristolochia
- Species: A. meridionalis

Binomial name
- Aristolochia meridionalis E.M.Ross

Synonyms
- Aristolochia sp. (D'Aguilar Range L.H.Bird+ AQ520943) Jessup in Henderson, 1997; Aristolochia sp. (Mt Coot-tha S.T.Blake 17388) Ross in Henderson 1994; Aristolochia sp. (south-east Qld) Jones & Gray 1988

Species of flowering plant

Aristolochia meridionalis is a species of sprawling vine native to Australia, specifically within the states of South-eastern Queensland and North-eastern New South Wales. It is a host plant for the troidine butterfly Cressida cressida.

== Taxonomy ==
There are currently two accepted subspecies:

- Aristolochia meridionalis subsp. centralis
- Aristolochia meridionalis subsp. meridionalis
