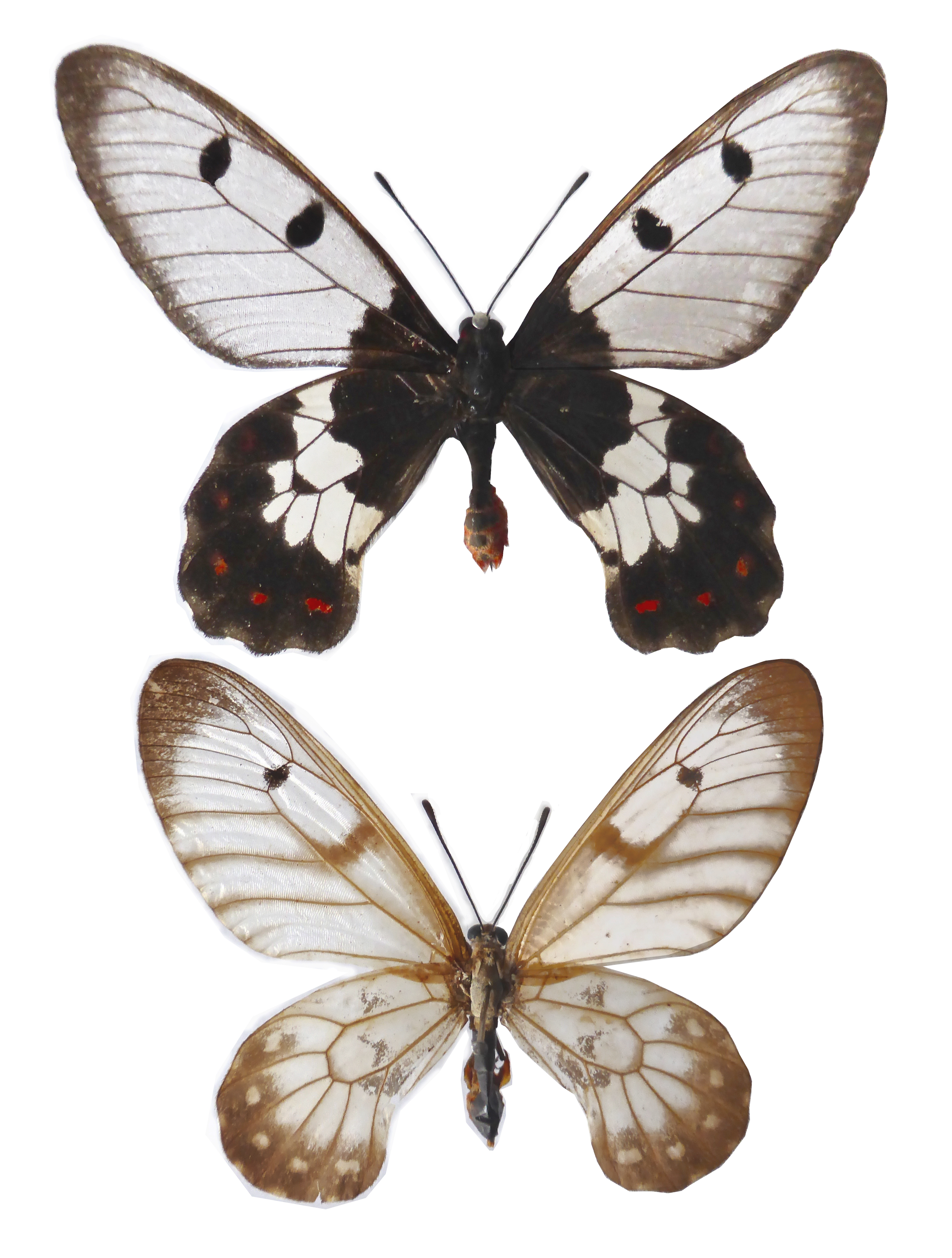
- Dorsal perspective of male (above) and female (below) C. c. cressida mounted specimens. A sphragis is partially visible on the female.

Scientific classification
- Kingdom: Animalia
- Phylum: Arthropoda
- Clade: Pancrustacea
- Class: Insecta
- Order: Lepidoptera
- Family: Papilionidae
- Subfamily: Papilioninae
- Tribe: Troidini
- Genus: Cressida; Swainson, 1832
- Species: C. cressida

Binomial name
- Cressida cressida (Fabricius, 1775)

Subspecies
- See text
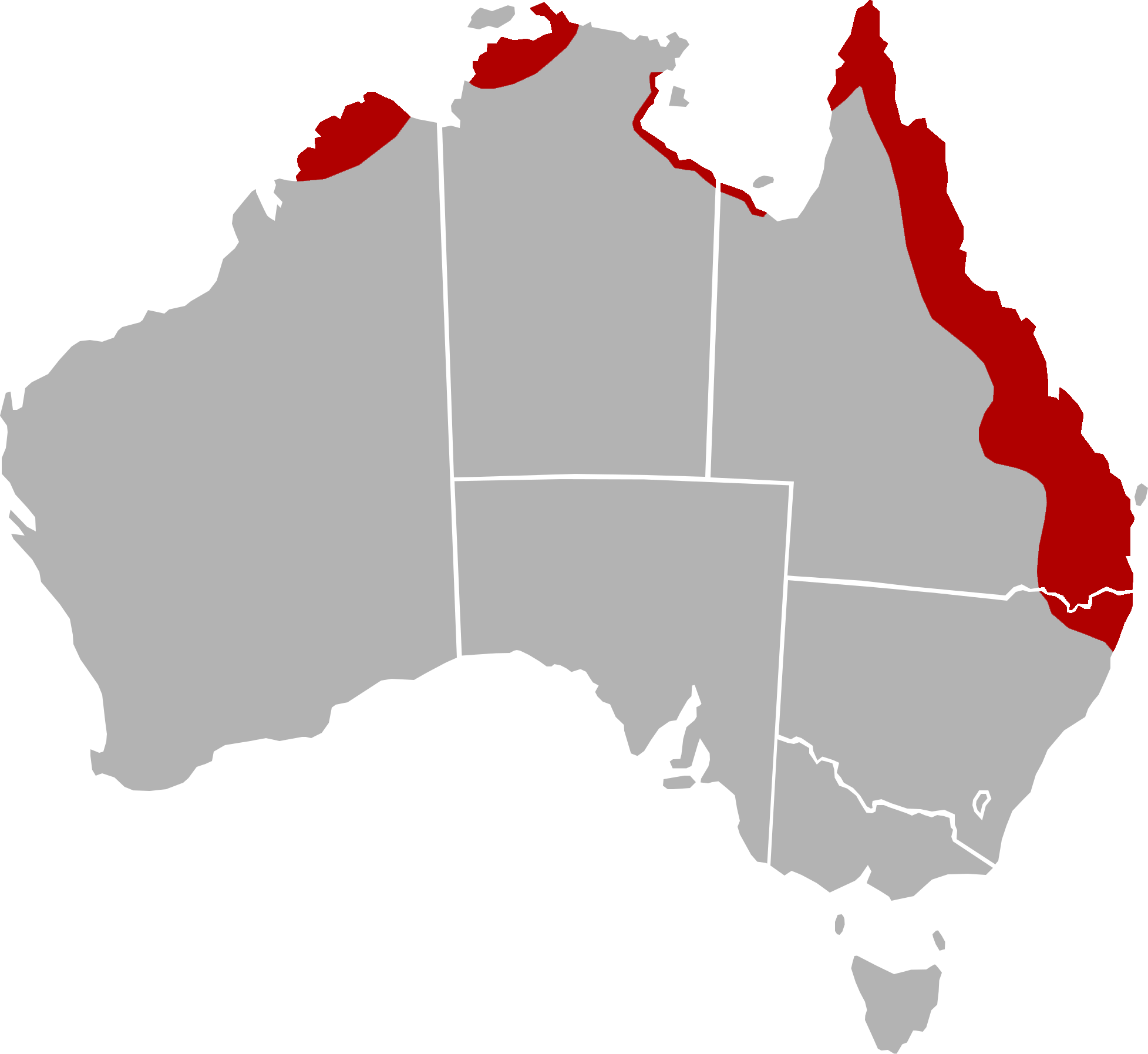
- Distribution map of Cressida cressida in Australia. Note: distribution is not limited to Australia.

Synonyms
- See text

= Cressida cressida =

Species of butterfly

Cressida cressida, the clearwing swallowtail or big greasy, is a Troidine swallowtail butterfly found in northern Australia, New Guinea, Maluku, and Timor. It is in the monotypic genus Cressida.

Remarkably, this species is not particularly closely related to other Asian swallowtails, but instead seems to be the closest living relative of the peculiar South American swallowtails of genus Euryades.

== Taxonomy ==
Johann Fabricius acquired the first specimens of this species from Joseph Banks, who collected them at the site of present-day Cooktown in 1770. Fabricius described the male and female as Papilio cressida and P. harmonia respectively, under the premise that the two were different species. The original specimens now reside in the Natural History Museum, London. Both male and female now possess the same name, cressida, however, this species is no longer placed in the genus Papilio, but in the genus Cressida. The systematics of the genus is as follows:

- Genus Cressida Swainson, 1832

Junior synonym: Eurycus Boisduval, [1836]

- Species Cressida cressida (Fabricius, 1775)

Basionym: Papilio cressida Fabricius, 1775
Junior synonym: Papilio harmonia Fabricius, 1793
Junior synonym: Papilio harmonides Godart, 1819
Junior synonym: Cressis heliconides Swainson, 1832

- Subspecies Cressida cressida cressida (Fabricius, 1775) – Australia and Maluku

Junior synonym: Eurycus cressida intermedius Rothschild, 1918
Junior synonym: Eurycus cressida kühni Rothschild, 1918
Junior synonym: Eurycus cressida cassandra Waterhouse & Lyell, 1914

- Subspecies Cressida cressida insularis (Fruhstorfer, 1909) – Timor

Basionym: Eurycus cressida insularis Fruhstorfer, 1909

- Subspecies Cressida cressida troilus (Butler, 1876) – New Guinea

Basionym: Eurycus cressida troilus Butler, 1876

== Description ==
For terms see External morphology of Lepidoptera

=== Life history ===
The eggs vary greatly in size. The caterpillars occur in several colour forms and possess yellow osmeteria that release a sweet smell. The caterpillars generally consume their entire food plant, and must travel along the ground to find another one. The chrysalis has a marble colouration, and is attached to dead grass or stones.

=== Adult ===
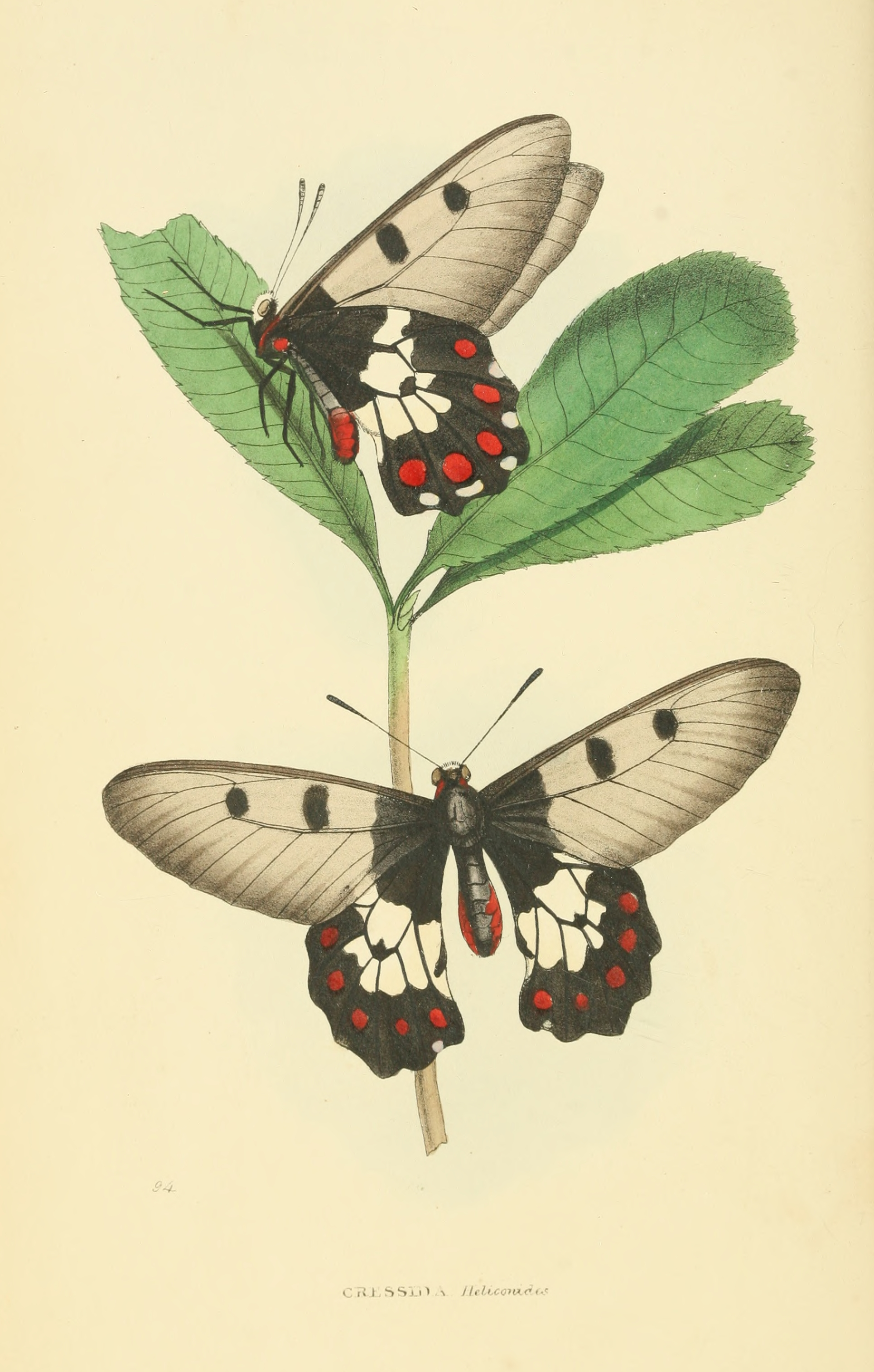
Plate from Zoological Illustrations, Volume 3, 2nd series

Adult males and females are quite dissimilar in appearance. However, both sexes have a black body marked with red scales and tough, transparent wings with limited scale covering. Both sexes have an unusually great range of size variation.

The spermatophore of Cressida cressida is modified into an external mating plug known as a sphragis (plural sphragides). The sphragis acts to increase the chance of individual males successfully producing offspring by preventing other males from inseminating already mated females. There is evidence that females have attempted to counter this strategy by evolving remarkably broad genitalia that makes it more difficult for sphragides to remain in place. The evolutionary incentive to counter the sphragis is likely the nutritional benefit females obtain from the spermatophore, hence multiple matings provide female butterflies with additional resources. The sphragis does not obstruct the passage of eggs as there are separate orifices for copulation and oviposition.

Males have a wingspan of 80 mm, wider than that of the female, an unusual trait among butterflies. The forewings are translucent with two black spots and a fine black border thickest at the apex of the wing. The hindwing has a thick black border surrounding a central white area with black veining. The black border encloses a series of red spots, whose size and number can vary; a warning colouration found in most butterflies that utilise the toxic Aristolochia as a larval food plant.

Females have a wingspan of 70 mm. The wings are a semi-translucent tawny colour, similar to aged greaseproof paper. This colouration is most intense immediately after the butterfly emerges, but soon fades and renders the wing almost totally transparent. Patterning of the female wing is similar to that of the male, but greatly reduced and diffused, with white areas on the hindwing extremely reduced and all red markings replaced by pale pink. The extent of the terminal band on the hindwing varies geographically.

== Ecology ==
The larvae feed on Aristolochia species, including A. tagala in the tropics. More commonly, it utilises smaller growing species such as A. thozetii and A. meridionalis ssp. centralis (formerly listed as A. pubera, A. sp. D'Aguilar Range and A. sp. Mt. Coot-tha) in southern Queensland. Having fed on these poisonous plants, the caterpillar is unpalatable to predators and remains so as an adult. Papilio anactus is a Batesian mimic of the male of this species in both appearance and style of flight, to achieve the same predator avoidance.

Cressida cressida occurs predominantly in drier forest throughout its range; in Australia, it is often encountered in dry Eucalyptus forest where its hosts grow as small scrambling vines in open areas. It is most common in forests bordering the Great Dividing Range. It is not a threatened species.

== Behaviour ==
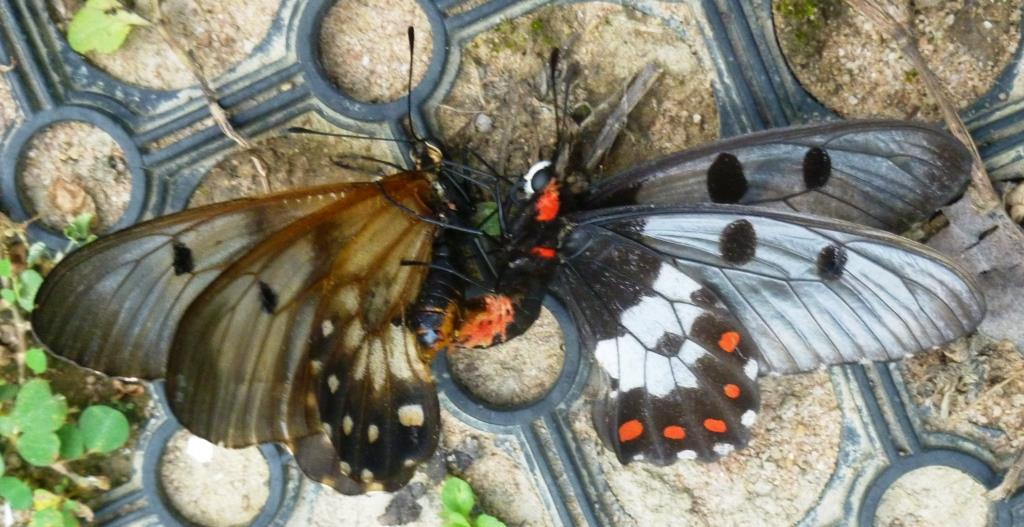
Copulating pair (female left, male right) of C. c. cressida on ground

Cressida cressida flies less erratically and more slowly than most other swallowtails, but may fly rapidly if disturbed.

Males tend to patrol breeding areas one to three meters above the ground in search of females, rarely landing. Areas where the larval food plant grows are defended aggressively by males, more often successfully by the larger males. Females are seized and forcibly mated in mid-air, but smaller males may carry the female to the ground. Females already bearing a sphragis are sometimes captured, but released soon after. Copulation lasts at least fourteen hours.

Females tend to fly closer to the ground in search of suitable larval food plants, and if already mated, will signal their unavailability in flight by raising the abdomen and lowering the wings to display the sphragis.

== Gallery ==
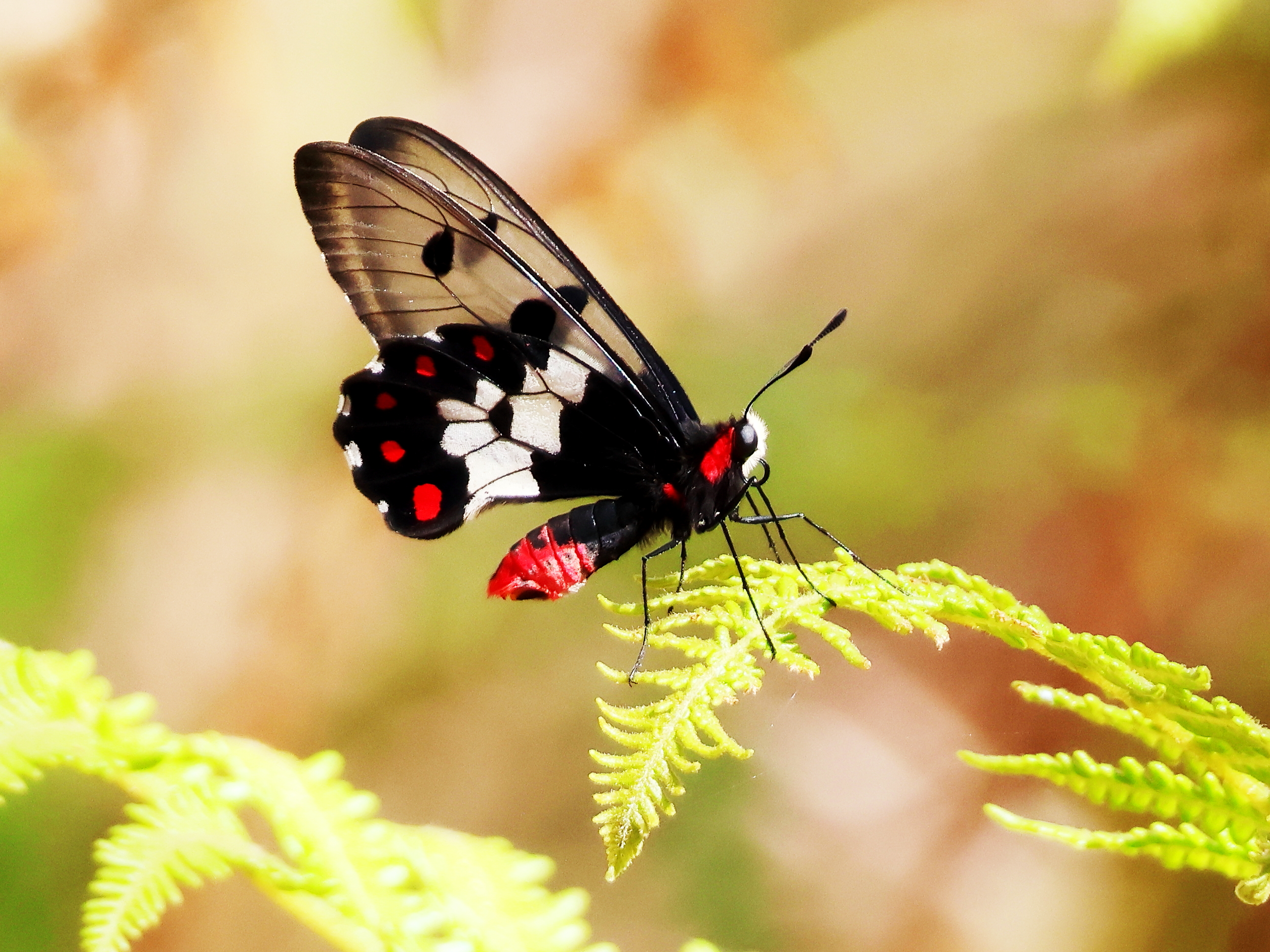
Male Clearwing swallowtail, Cairns, Queensland

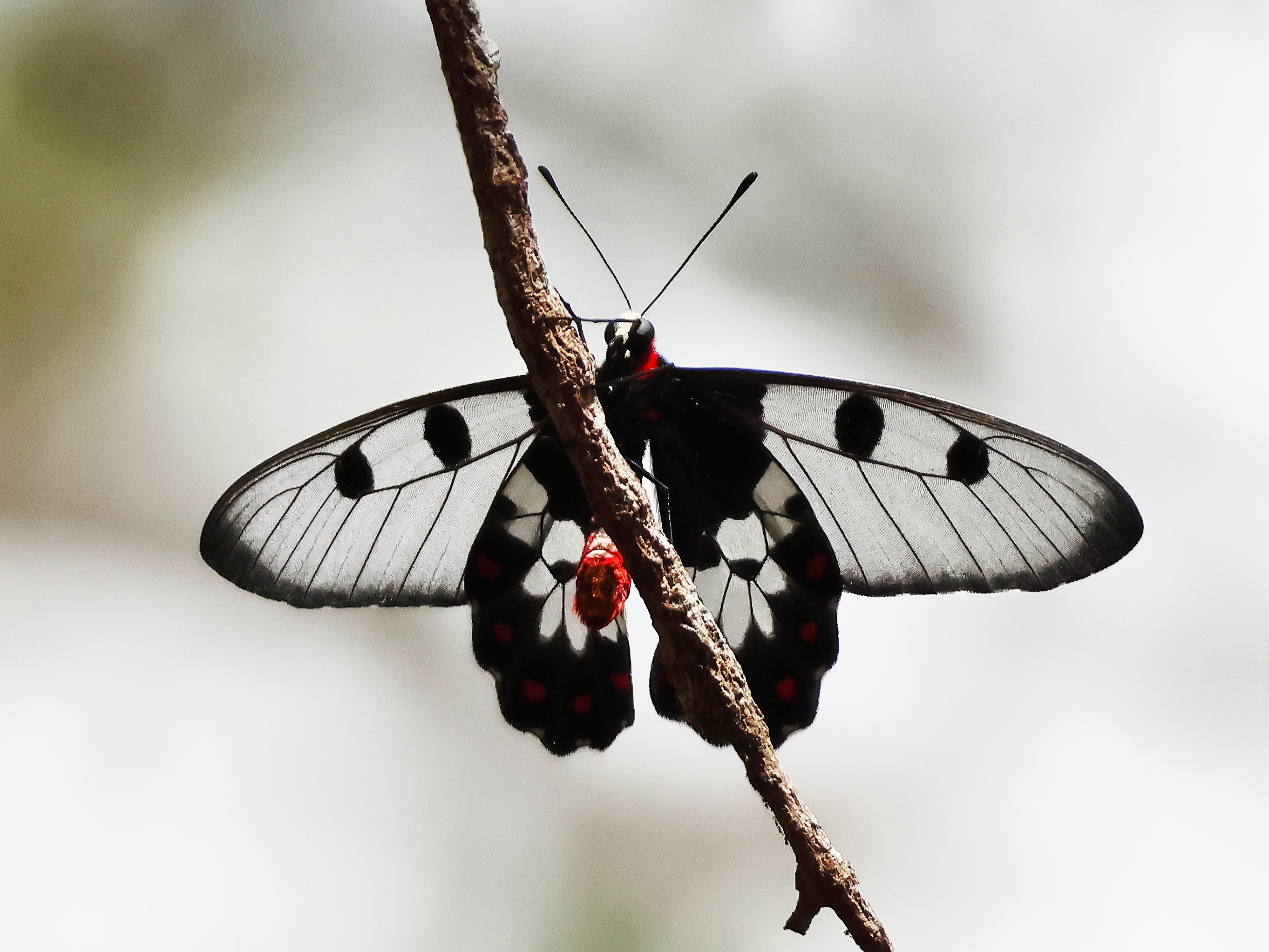
Male Clearwing swallowtail from below. Cairns
