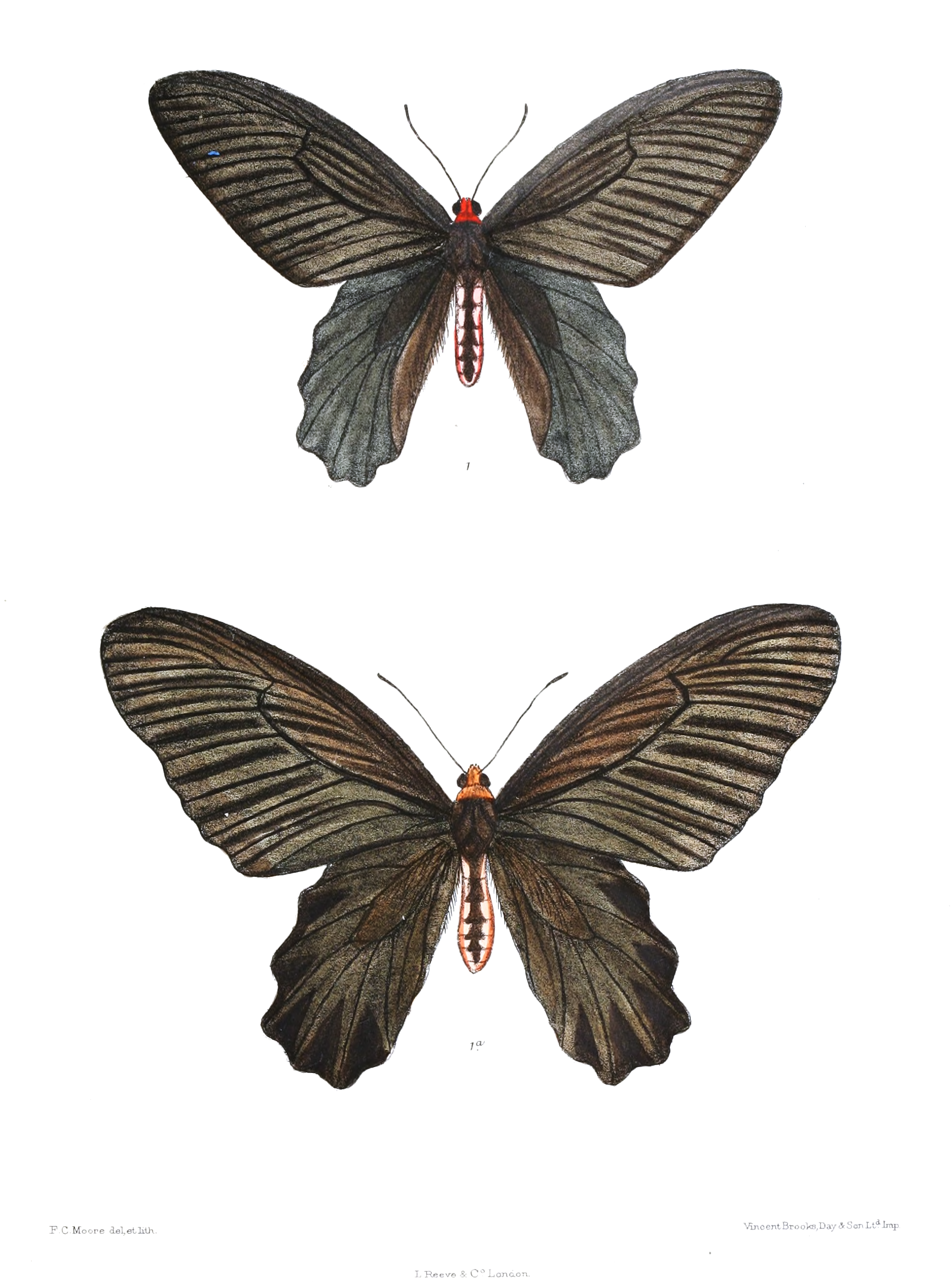
- Male (above) and female

Scientific classification
- Kingdom: Animalia
- Phylum: Arthropoda
- Clade: Pancrustacea
- Class: Insecta
- Order: Lepidoptera
- Family: Papilionidae
- Genus: Atrophaneura
- Species: A. aidoneus

Binomial name
- Atrophaneura aidoneus Doubleday, 1845

= Atrophaneura aidoneus =

Lesser batwing

Species of butterfly

Atrophaneura aidoneus, the lesser batwing, is an Asian species of butterfly that belongs to the batwings group of Atrophaneura, comprising tailless black swallowtail butterflies.

== Description ==
- Wingspan: 112–162 mm.
- Male: Tailless. Above, the butterfly is bluish black and unmarked. It has a white scent patch in a square dorsal fold, which is pink or red on its marginal edge. This white scent patch is smaller than that of the common windmill.
- Female: Tailless. Above, the butterfly is grey brown. It has dark stripes between the veins.

Resembles Atrophaneura varuna race astorion, but differs as follows: Cell of forewing proportionately not quite so long; abdominal fold to the hindwing in male not so broad, its lower margin not square, rounded; the specialized scales within the fold white, with an edging of pink. Female larger. Upperside: ground colour olivaceous brown, never black; abdomen with a broad white, not crimson, lateral stripe.

== Description in Seitz ==
Head red, the long hairs often almost all black;the sides of the breast and abdomen red, and the sides of the latter mostly white-red. Wings blue-black, in the female often brownish, the forewing lighter, with the usual black stripes at the veins and folds. Scent¬fold of the male as the preceding species [Atrophaneura hageni]with white area, posteriorly edged with pale salmon-colour. North-West India, Sikkim, Bhutan, Khassia Hills (very rare), Burma, Shan States, Tonkin and Hainan; in Sikkim not rare up to about 5000 ft. from April to November; according to Manders the butterfly flies by preference in the deep shadow of forest-trees which overhang rivers. Its flight is slow and graceful.Karl Jordan in Seitz (page 29)

== Range ==
Northern India, Bhutan, Burma, northern Vietnam, northern Laos, southern China (including Hainan (Guangdong province)).

In India, it is found in Uttarakhand, Sikkim, Assam, Meghalaya, Manipur and Nagaland.

== Status ==
The butterfly is not common but not regarded as threatened.

== Taxonomy ==
No subspecies.

== Habitat ==
The lesser batwing flies from April to November and frequents forests up to the altitude of 5,000 feet (1,500 m).

== Habits ==
The lesser batwing is a shade-loving forest butterfly. It has a slow and graceful flight. Both sexes frequent flowers, often Lantana.

== See also ==
- Swallowtail butterfly
- List of butterflies of India
- List of butterflies of India (Papilionidae)
