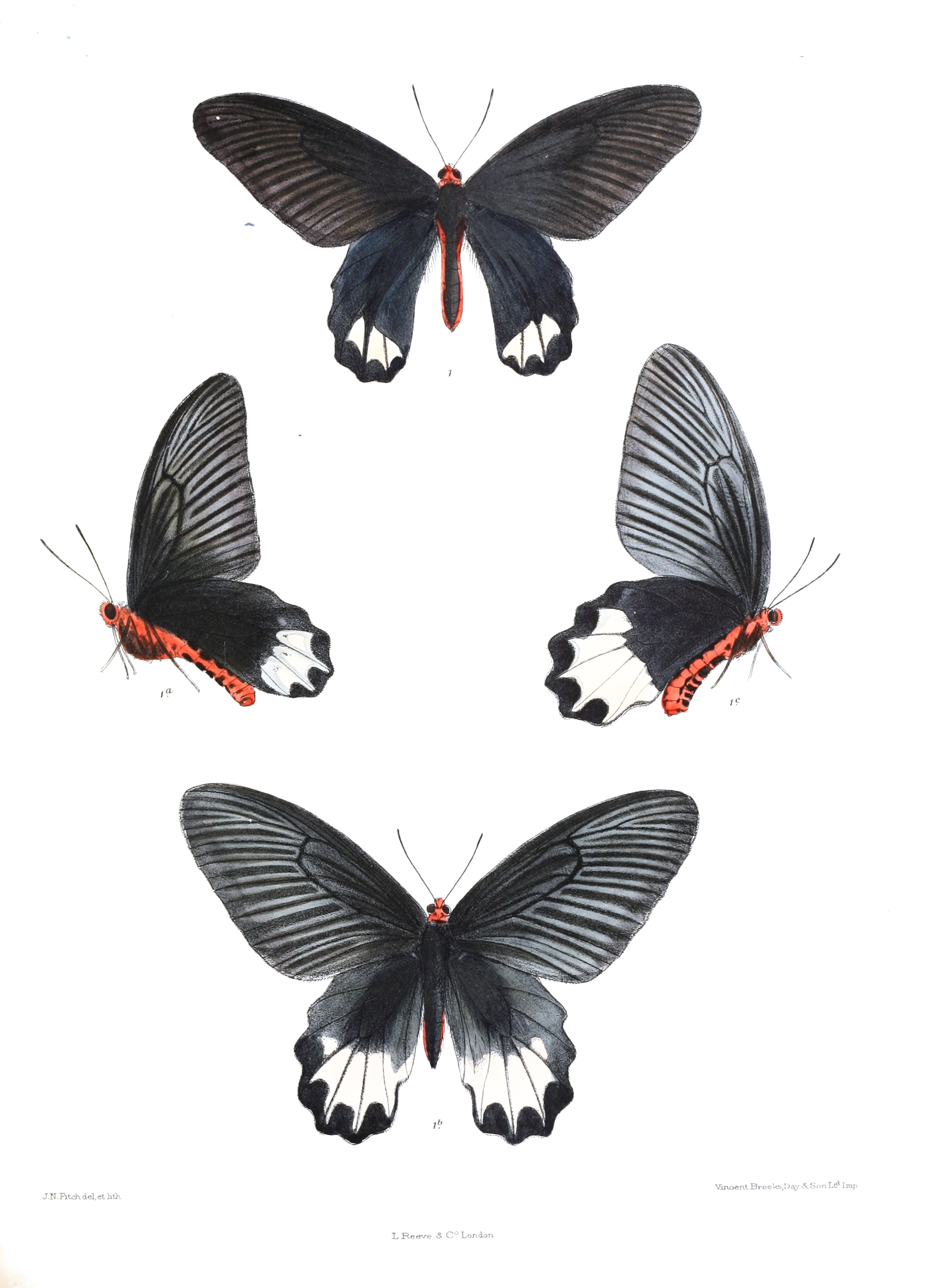

Scientific classification
- Kingdom: Animalia
- Phylum: Arthropoda
- Clade: Pancrustacea
- Class: Insecta
- Order: Lepidoptera
- Family: Papilionidae
- Genus: Atrophaneura
- Species: A. astorion
- Subspecies: A. a. zaleucus

Trinomial name
- Atrophaneura astorion zaleucus (Hewitson, [1865])

Synonyms
- Papilio zaleucus Hewitson, [1865]; Papilio nigricans Fruhstorfer, 1899; Atrophaneura varuna zaleucus [Yutaka Inayoshi]; Papilio zaleucus Rothschild, 1895; Atrophaneura zaleucus

= Atrophaneura astorion zaleucus =

Subspecies of butterfly

Atrophaneura astorion zaleucus is a subspecies of butterfly from the family Papilionidae that is found in Burma.

The wingspan is 100–110 mm. The wings are black. The body is covered in red hair. There are white markings on the hindwings.

== Etymology ==
It is named in the classical tradition. Zaleucus (ancient Greek: Ζάλευκος; fl. 7th century BC) was a Greek lawgiver.
