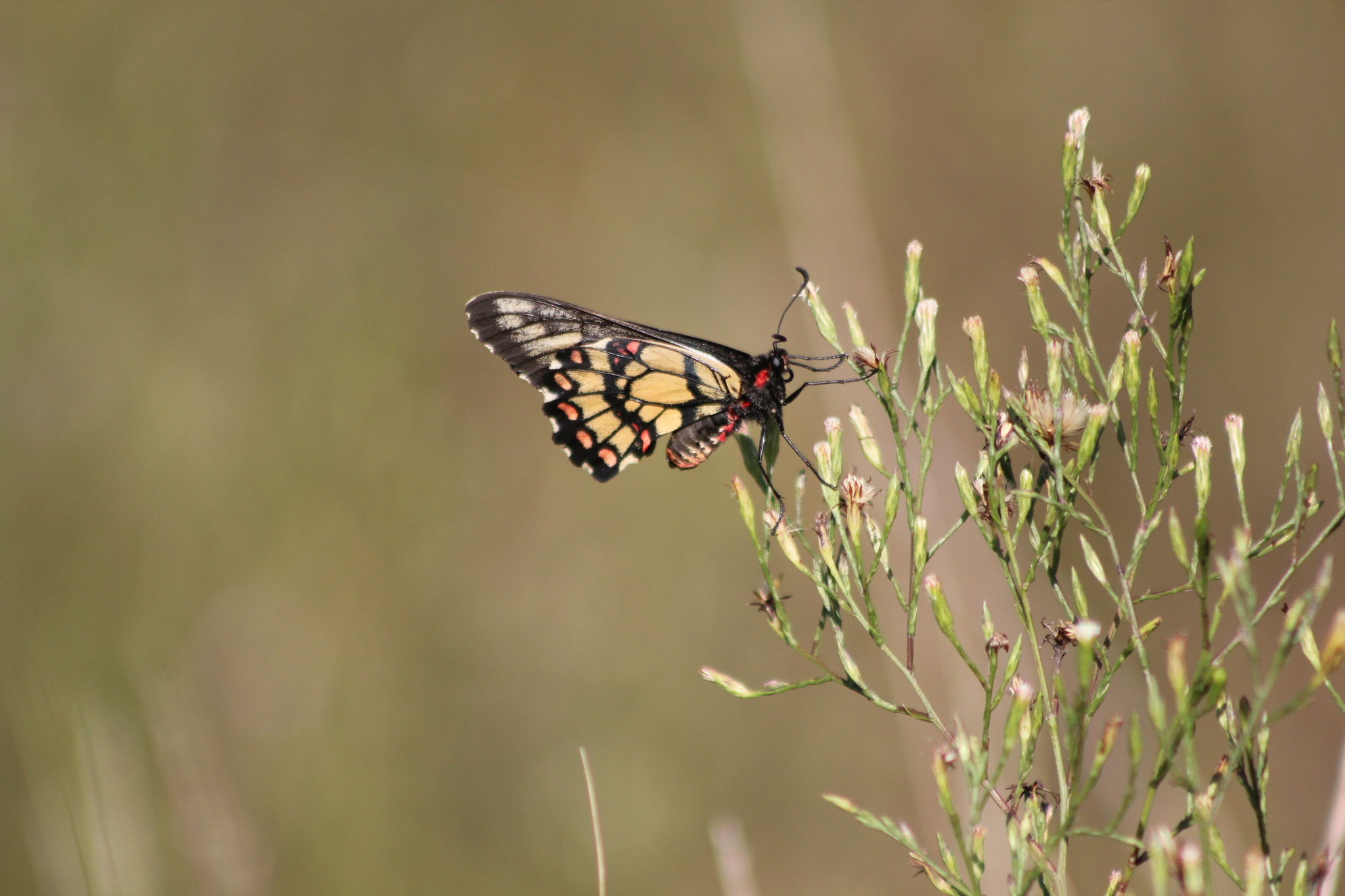
- Adult
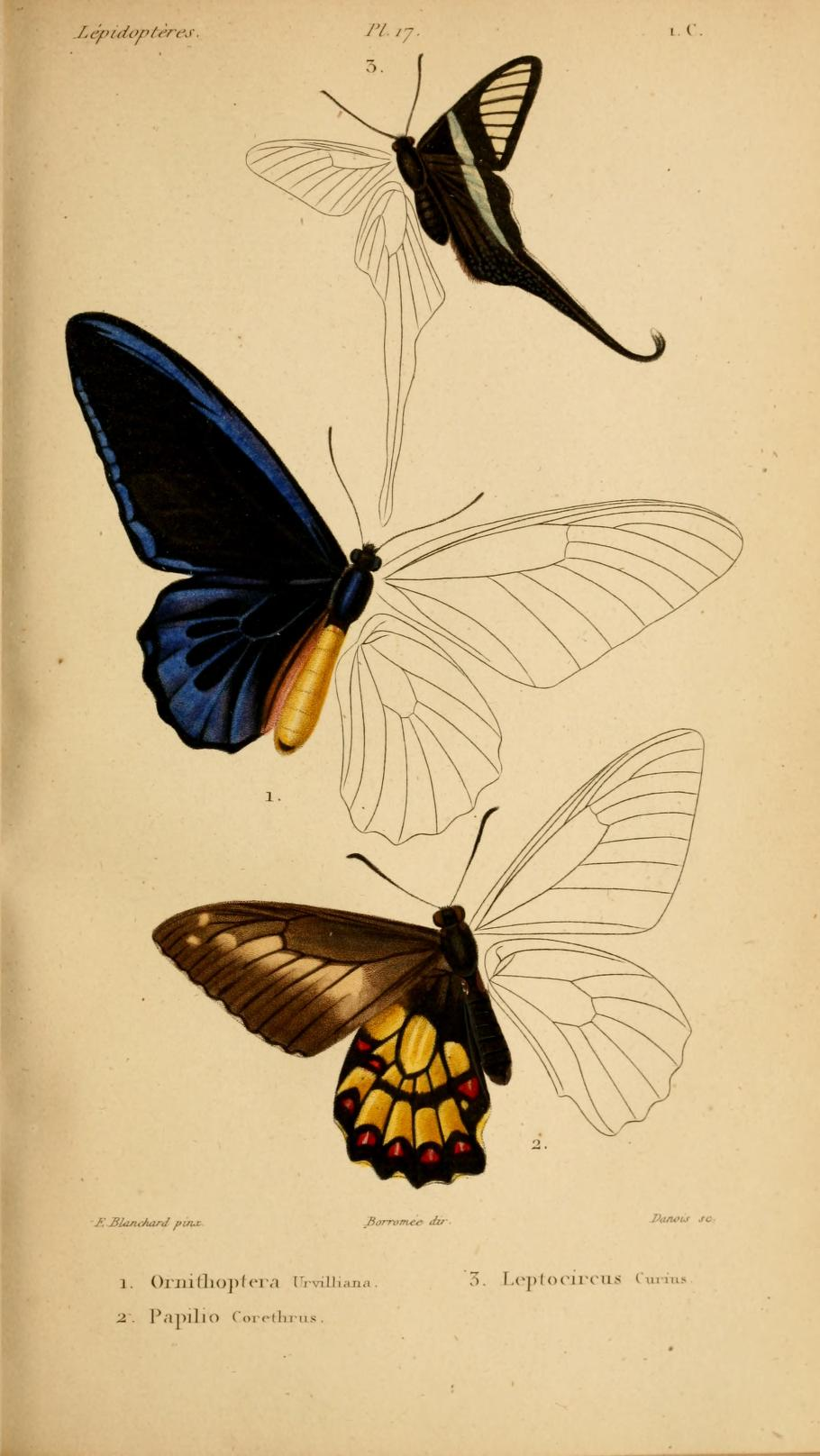

Conservation status
- Near Threatened (IUCN 3.1)

Scientific classification
- Kingdom: Animalia
- Phylum: Arthropoda
- Clade: Pancrustacea
- Class: Insecta
- Order: Lepidoptera
- Family: Papilionidae
- Genus: Euryades
- Species: E. corethrus

Binomial name
- Euryades corethrus (Boisduval, 1836)

Synonyms
- Papilio corethrus Boisduval, 1836

= Euryades corethrus =

Species of butterfly

Euryades corethrus is a species of butterfly from the family Papilionidae that is found in Brazil, Paraguay, Uruguay, and Argentina.

E. corethrus is a tailless swallowtail. The male is much paler than duponcheli and semitransparent. The hind wing upperside has a band of yellow spots outside the red discal spots. The female is likewise paler than duponcheli, the margin more narrowly black and the very pale red submarginal spots of the hindwing large, the discal row on the contrary replaced by black spots, only the last black spot is always dotted with reddish grey (often also the first and sometimes the next two as well).

Seitz

The larvae feed on Aristolochia sessilifolia, Aristolochia fimbriata, and other Aristolochia species.
