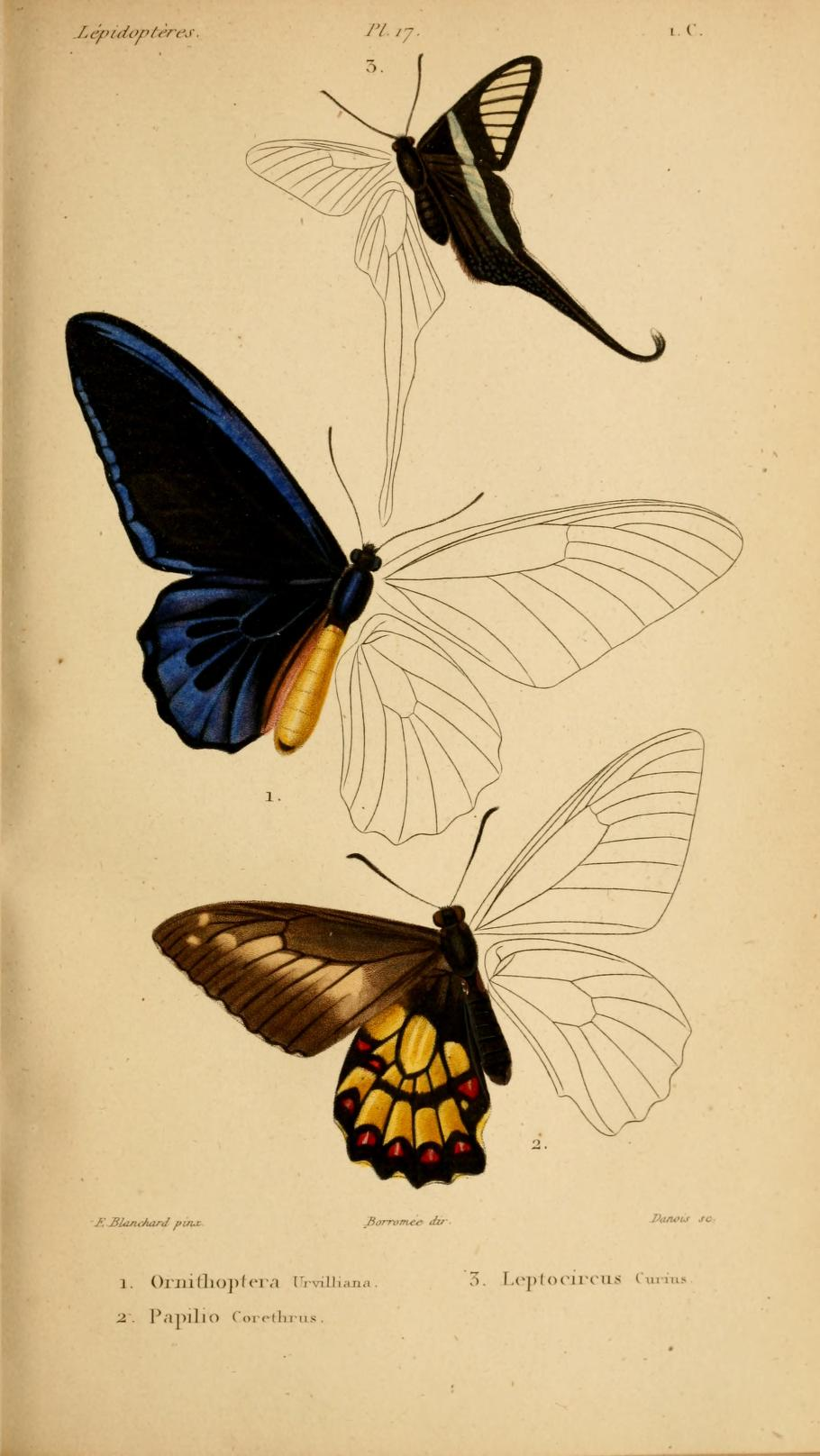

Scientific classification
- Kingdom: Animalia
- Phylum: Arthropoda
- Clade: Pancrustacea
- Class: Insecta
- Order: Lepidoptera
- Family: Papilionidae
- Tribe: Troidini
- Genus: Euryades; C. Felder & R. Felder, 1864

Species
- See text

= Euryades =

Genus of butterflies

Euryades is a genus of butterflies in the family Papilionidae. They are native to South America.

== Species ==
- Euryades corethrus (Boisduval, 1836)
- Euryades duponchelii (Lucas, 1839)
