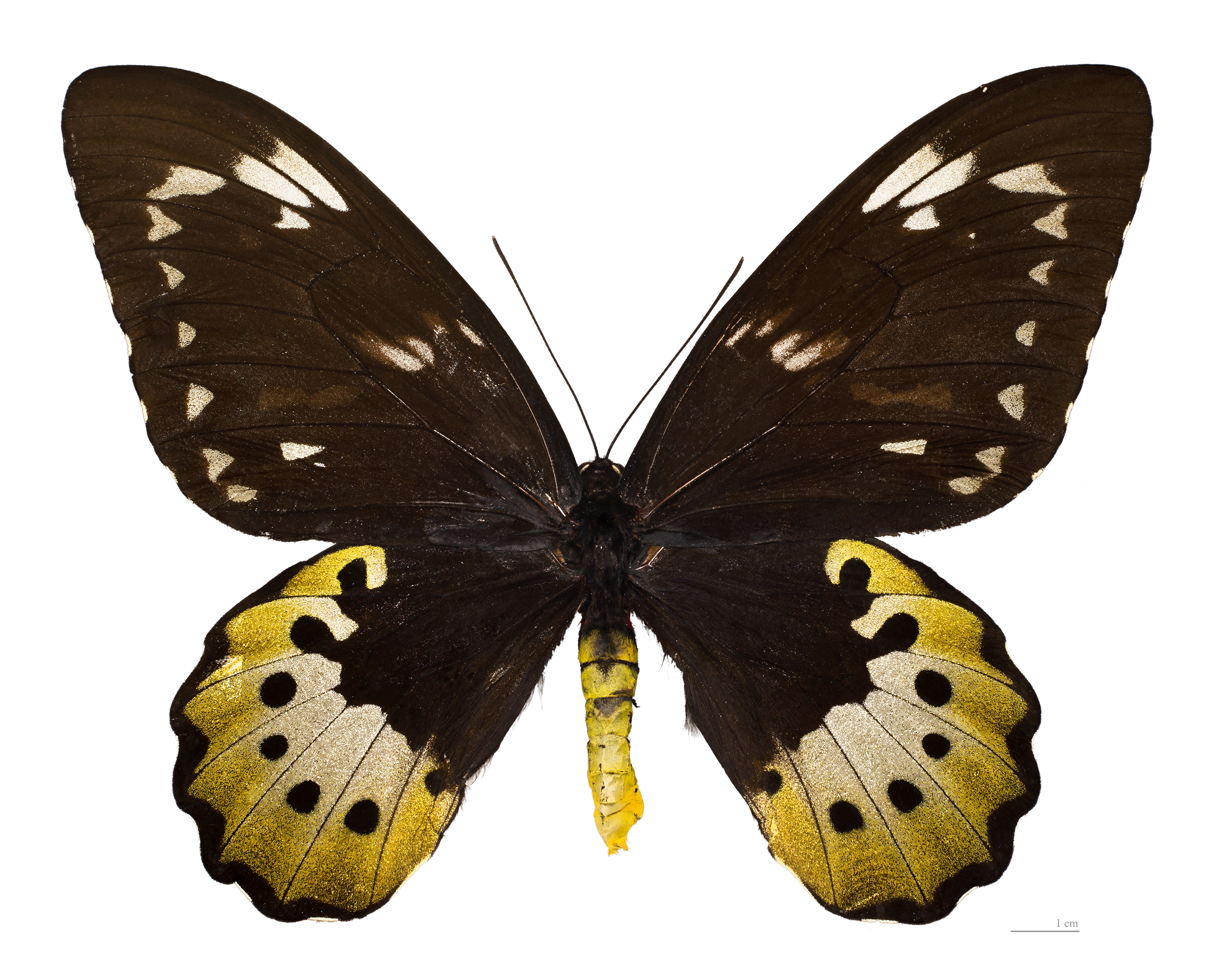
- Ornithoptera goliath female
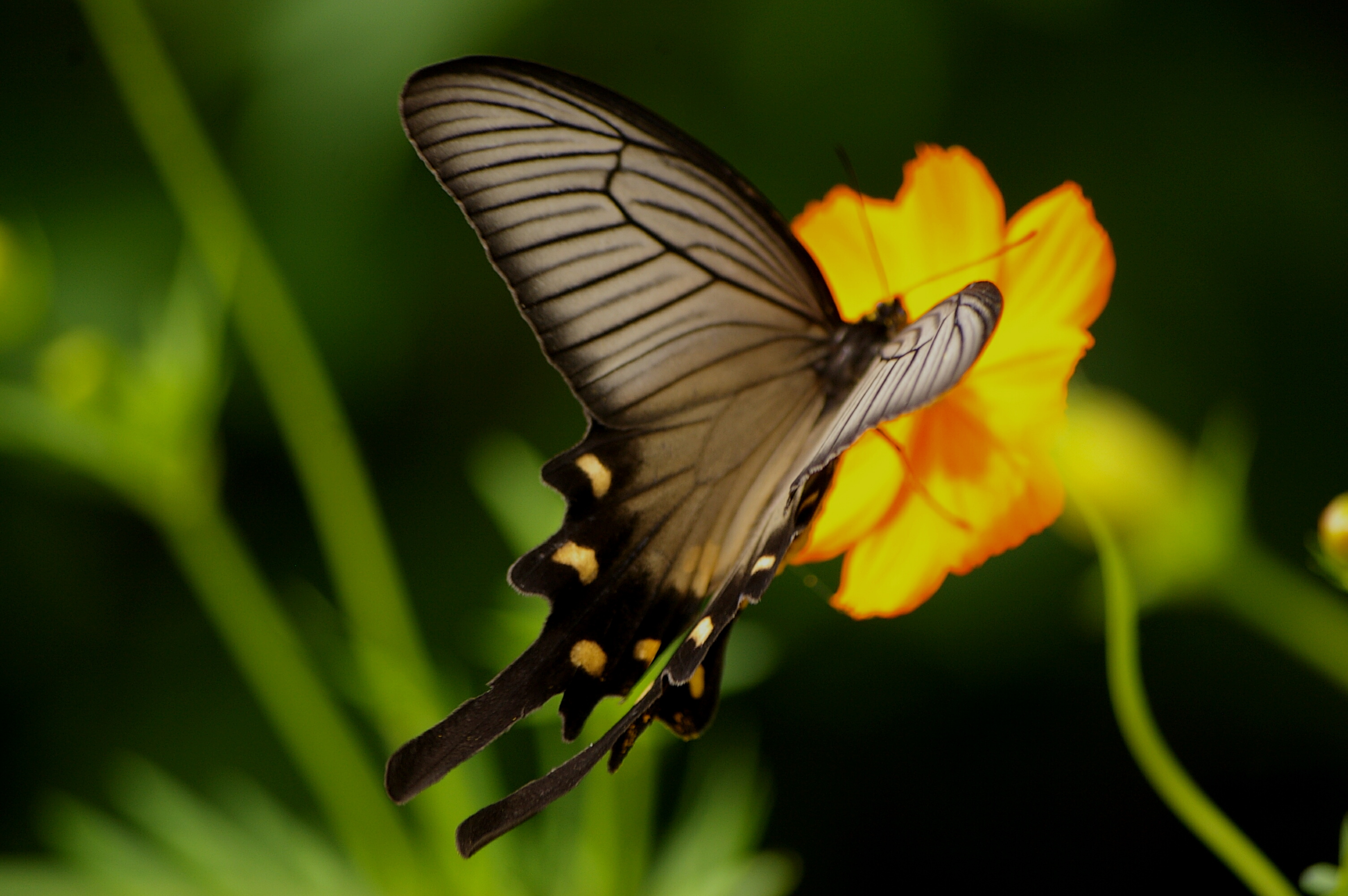
- Byasa alcinous

Scientific classification
- Kingdom: Animalia
- Phylum: Arthropoda
- Class: Insecta
- Order: Lepidoptera
- Family: Papilionidae
- Subfamily: Papilioninae
- Tribe: Troidini; Talbot, 1939

Genera
- See text

= Troidini =

Tribe of butterflies

Troidini is a tribe of swallowtail butterflies that consists of some 135 species in 12 genera. Members of this tribe are superlatively large among butterflies (in terms of both wingspan and surface area) and are often strikingly coloured.

== Genera ==
The tribe consists of the following genera:

- Atrophaneura
- Battus
- Byasa
- Cressida
- Euryades
- Losaria
- Ornithoptera
- Pachliopta
- Parides
- Pharmacophagus
- Trogonoptera
- Troides

== Ecology ==
Members of this tribe feed on poisonous pipevine plants, typically of the genus Aristolochia, as larvae. As a result, they themselves are poisonous and unpalatable to predators (Pinheiro 1986), like the pipevine swallowtail, and are mimicked by other butterflies (Scott 1986).

=== Examples of butterflies in Troidini ===
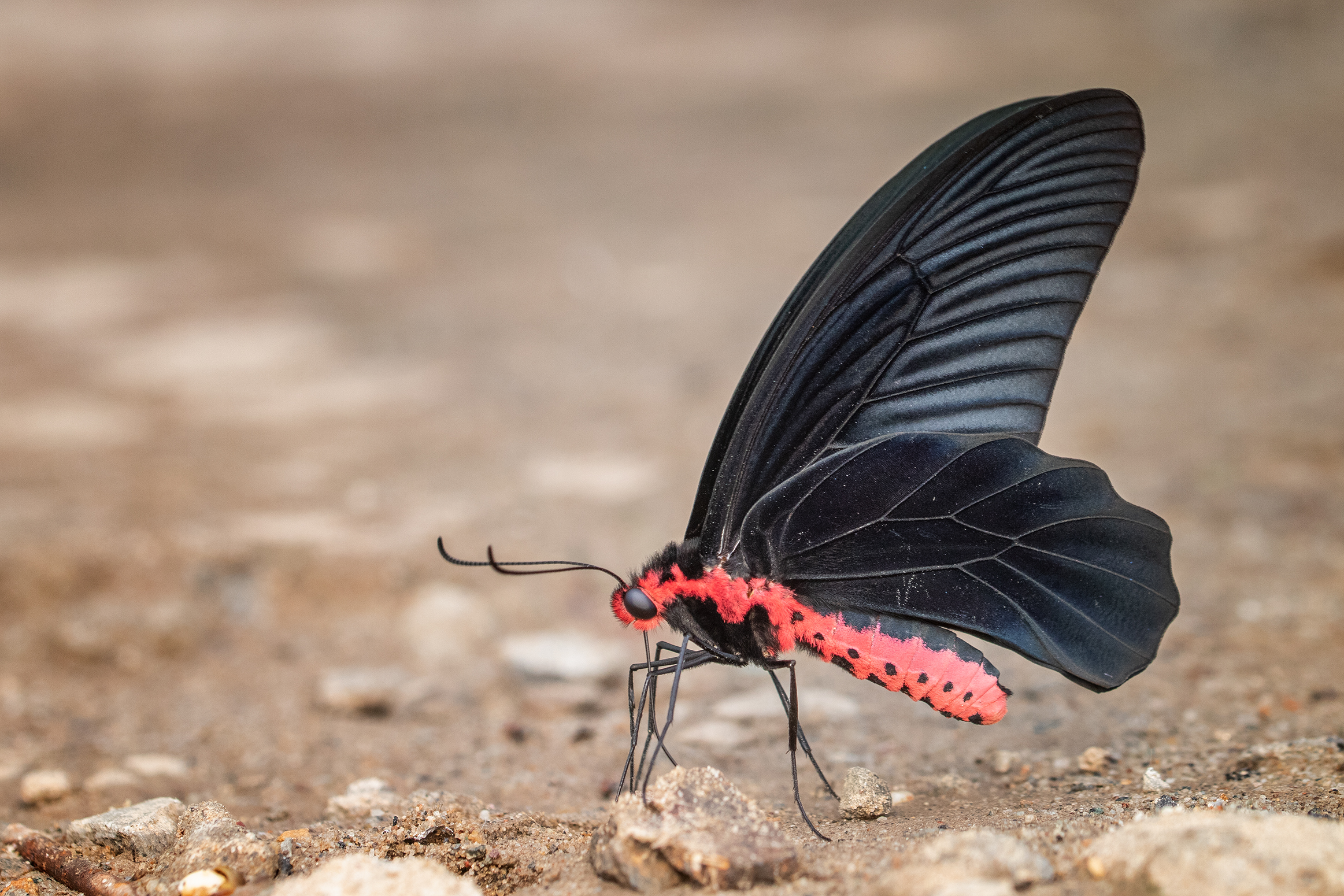
Atrophaneura varuna

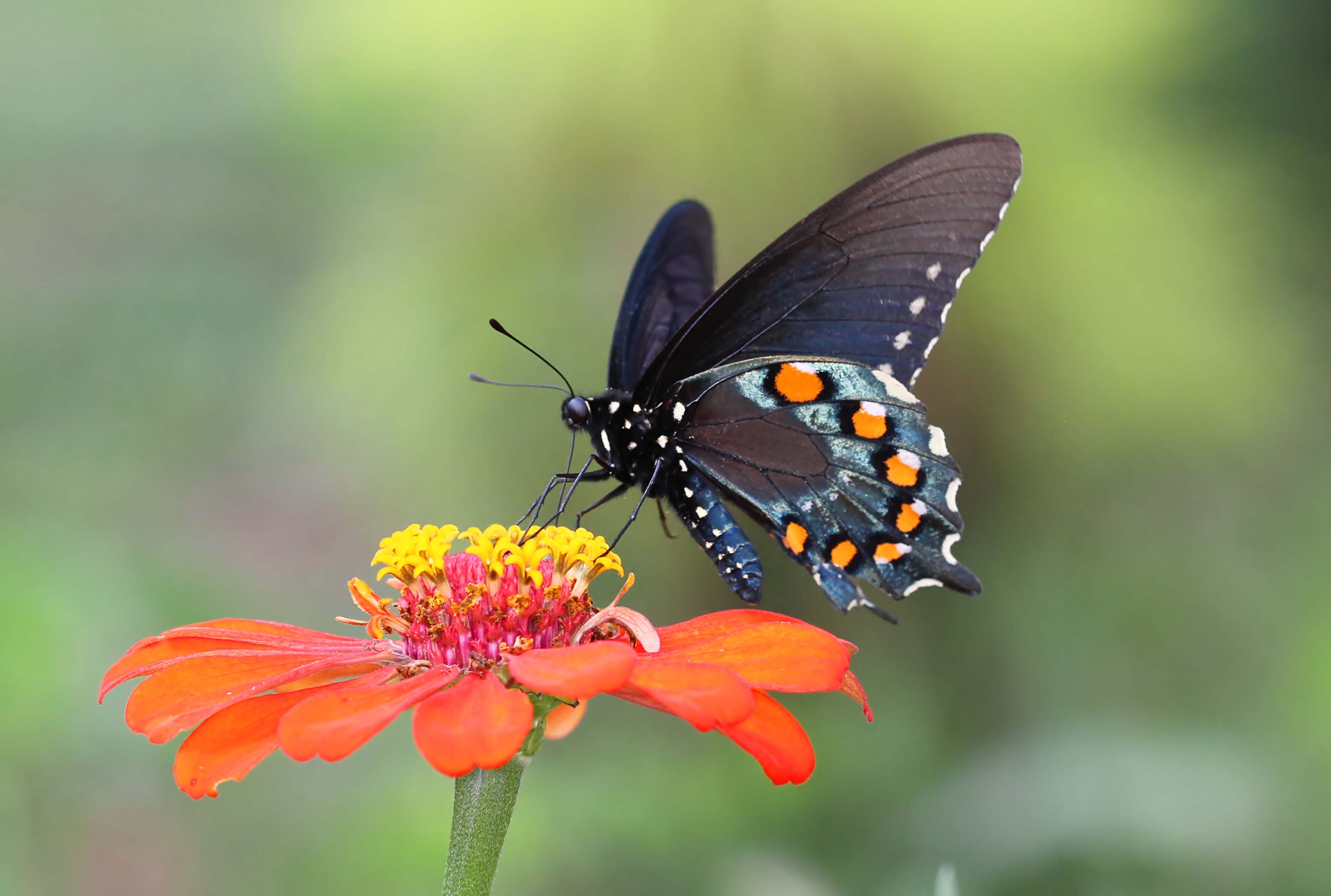
Battus philenor

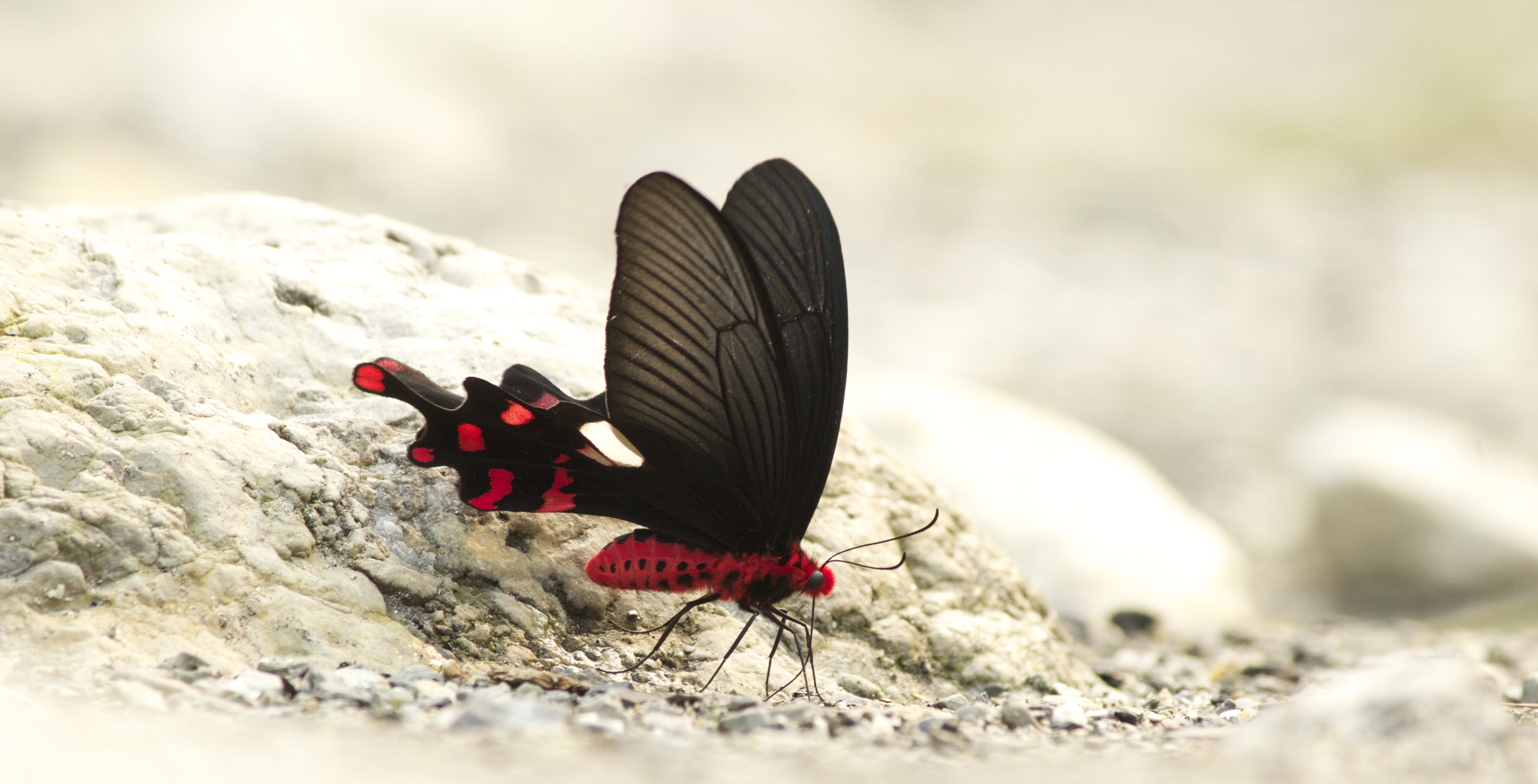
Byasa polyeuctes

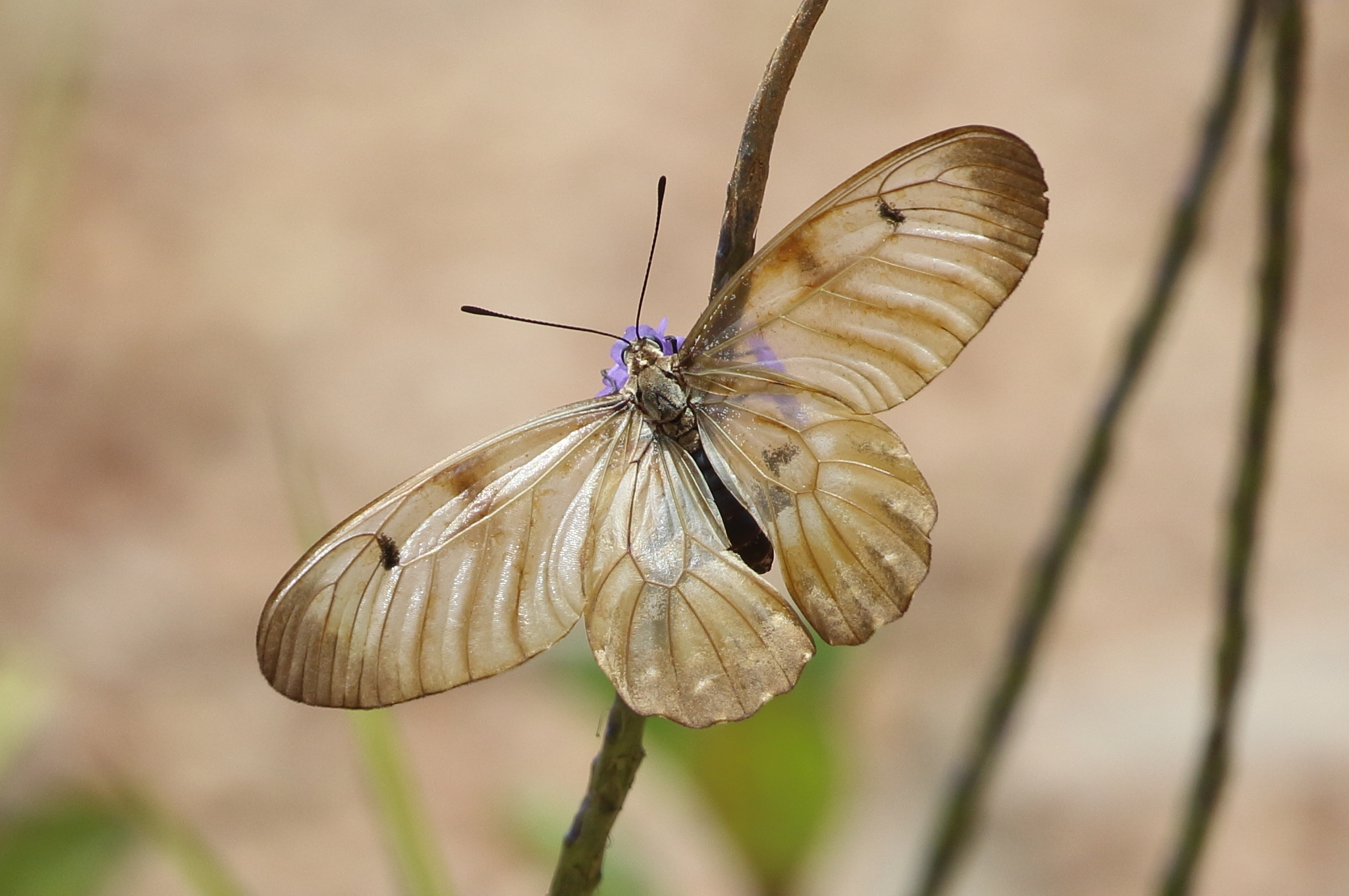
Cressida cressida

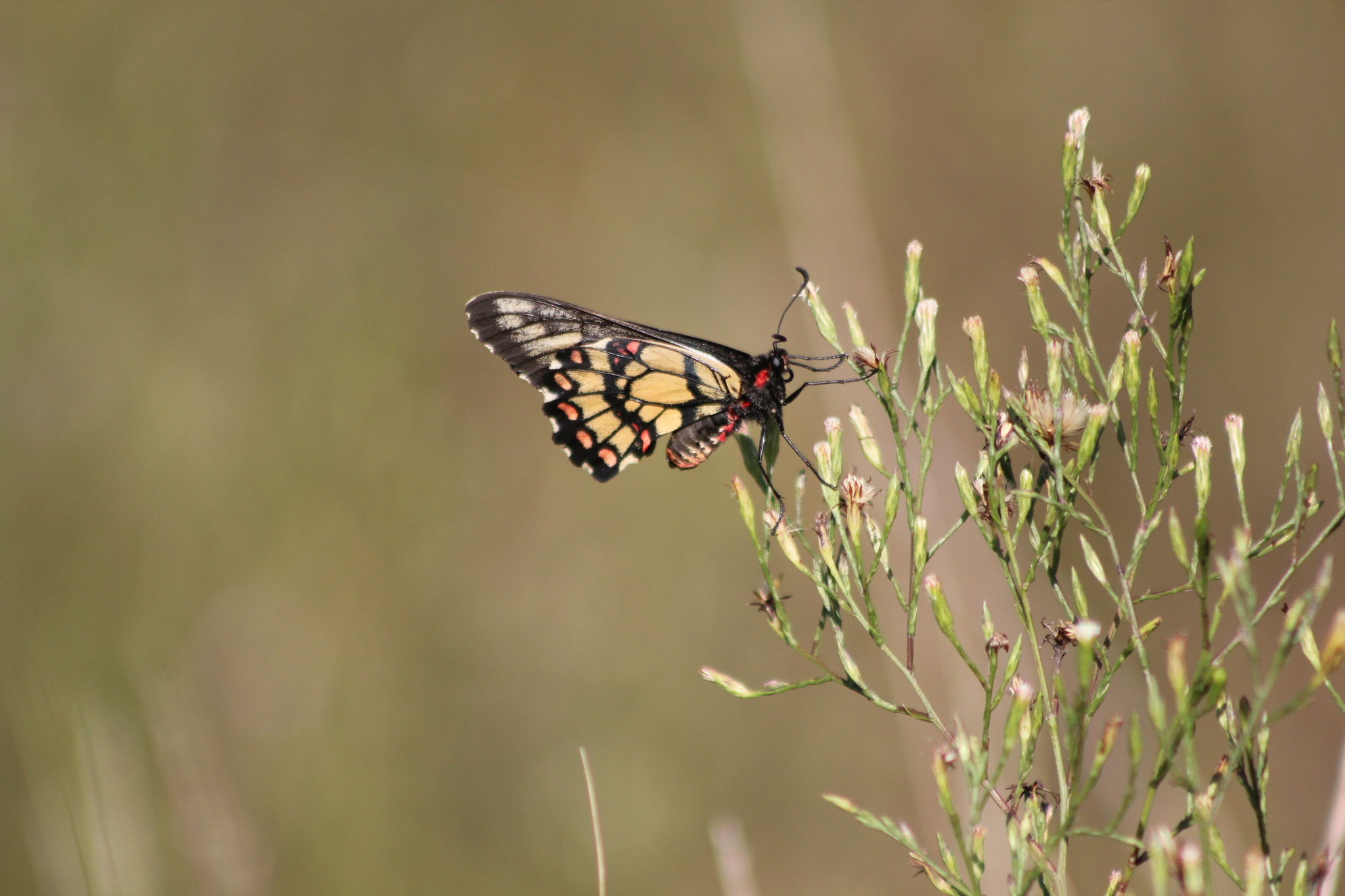
Euryades corethrus

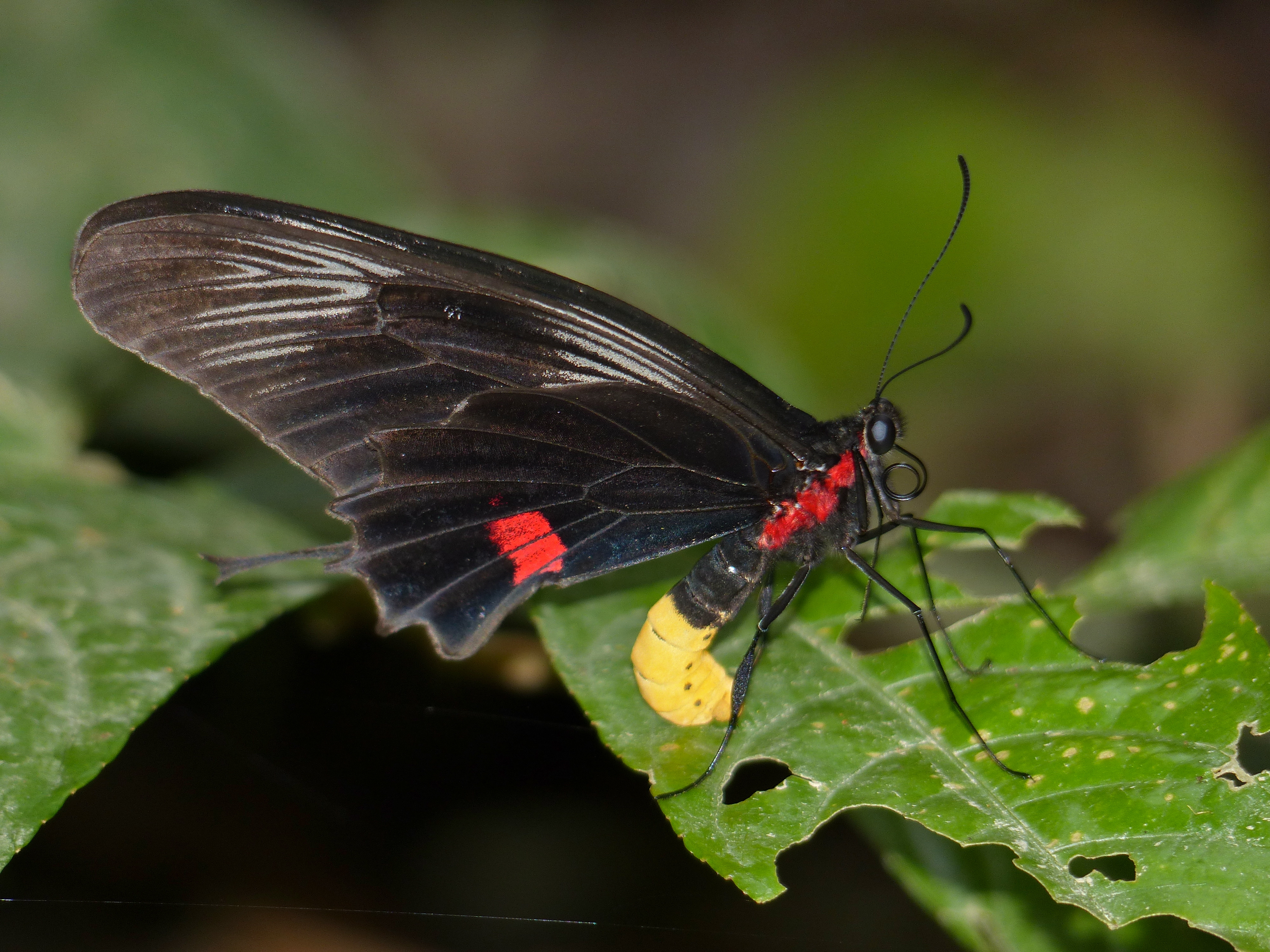
Losaria neptunus

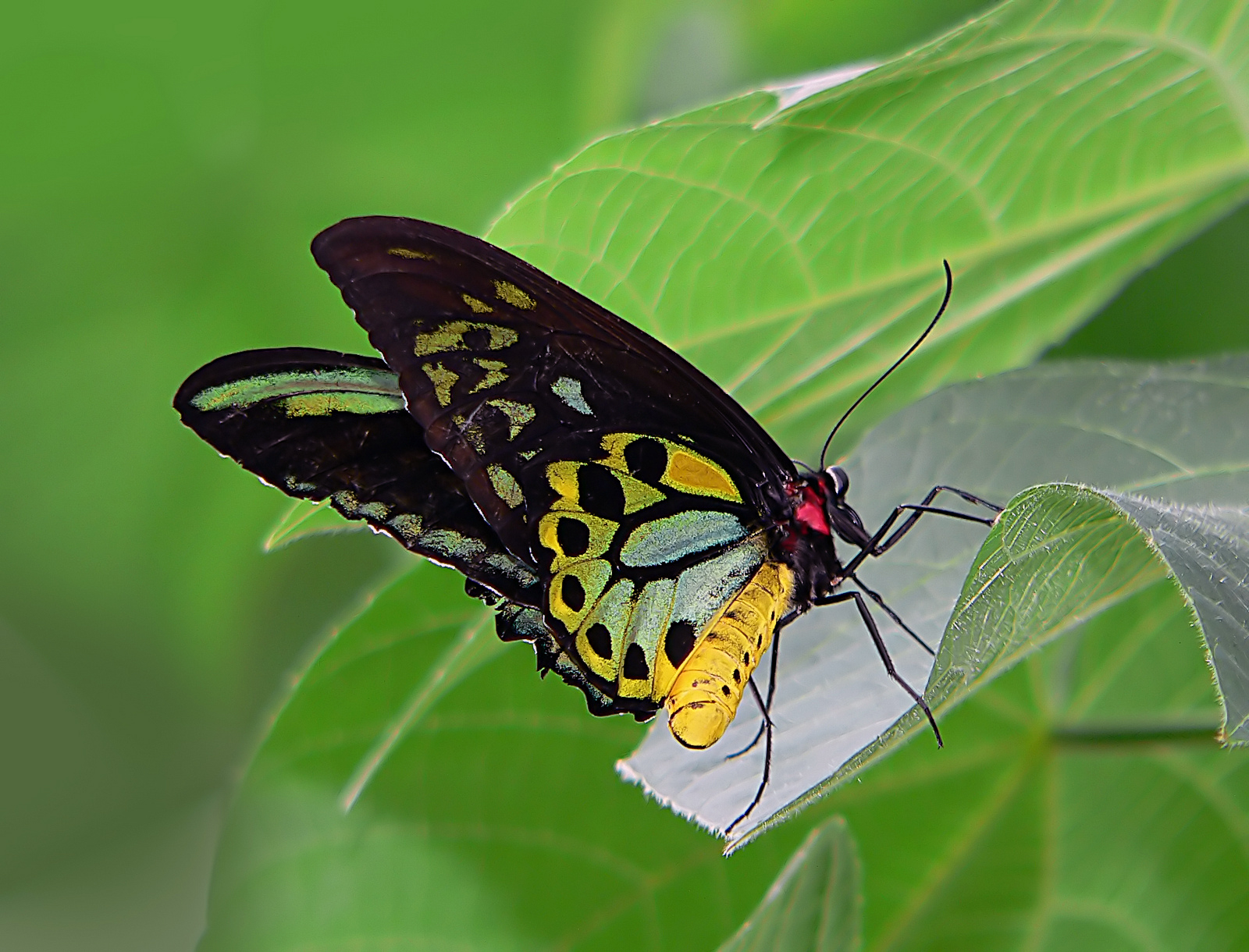
Ornithoptera euphorion

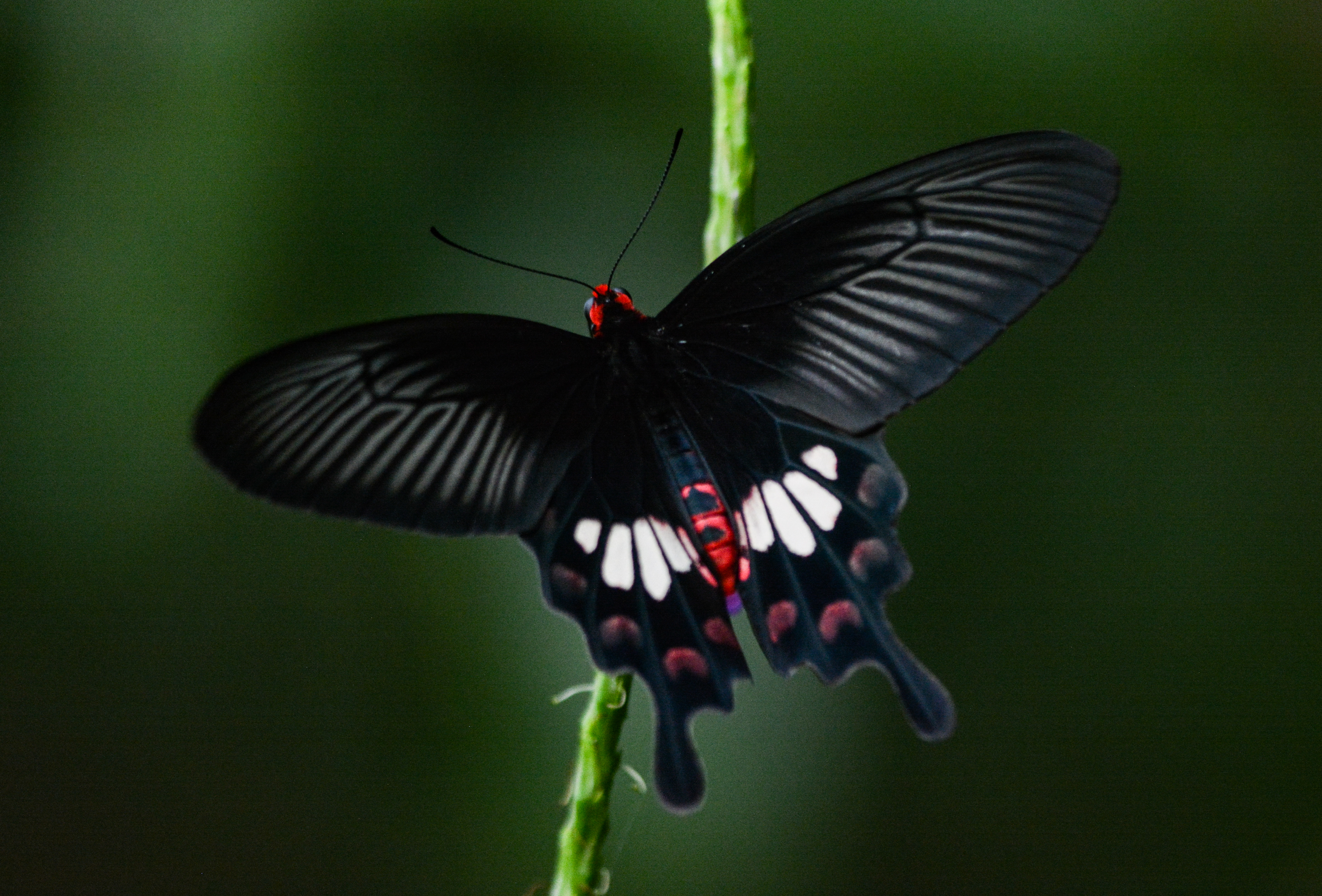
Pachliopta aristolochiae

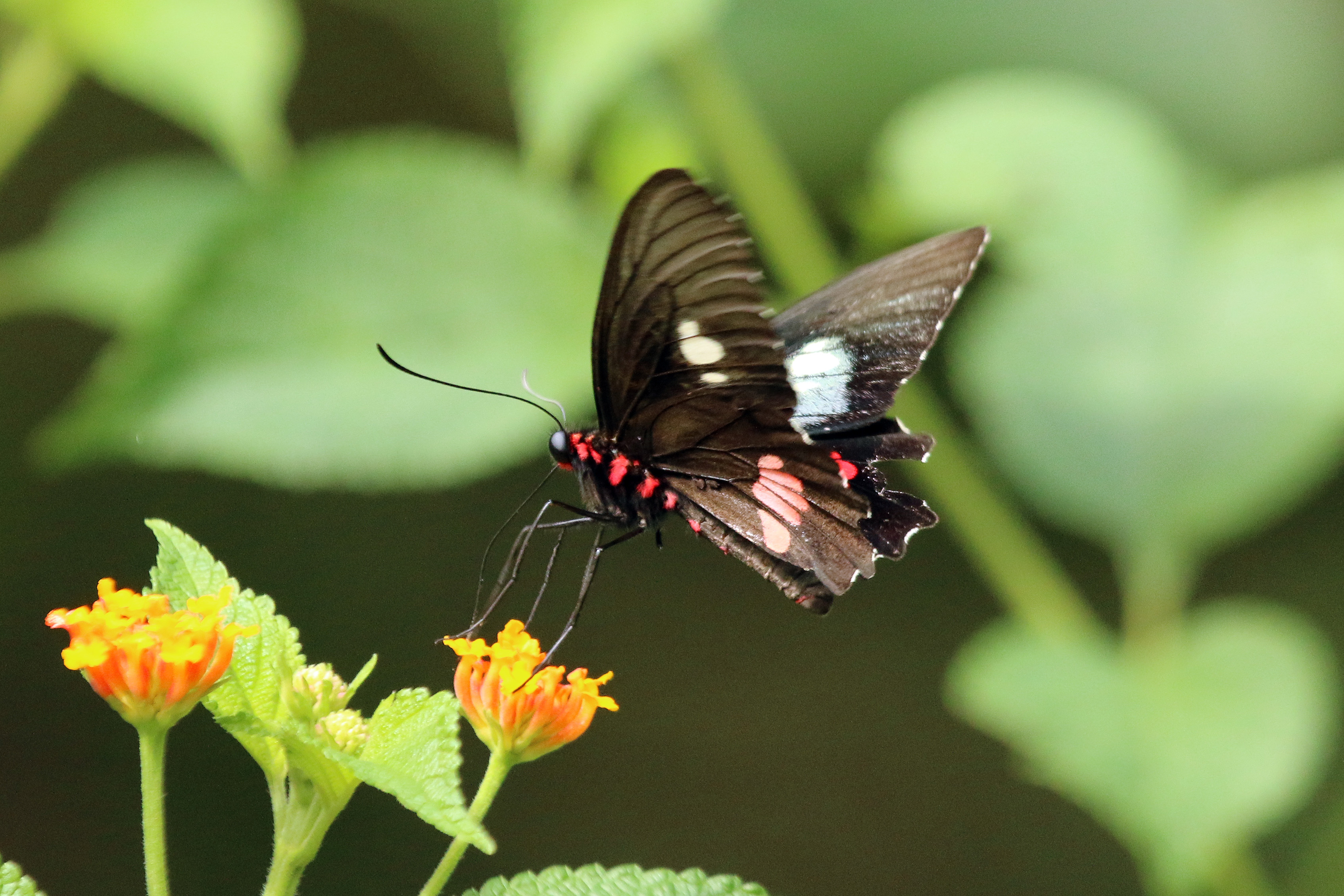
Parides neophilus

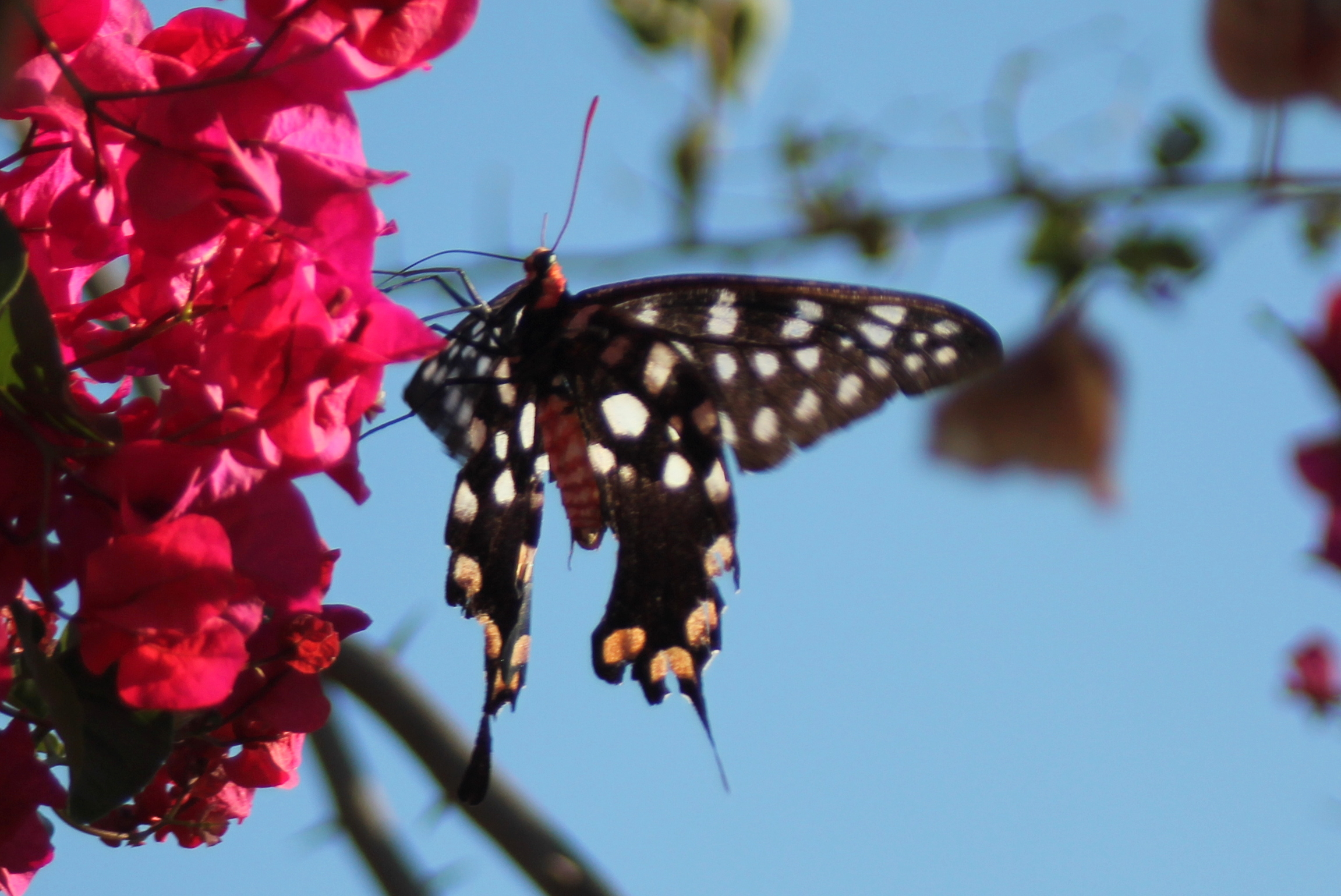
Pharmacophagus antenor

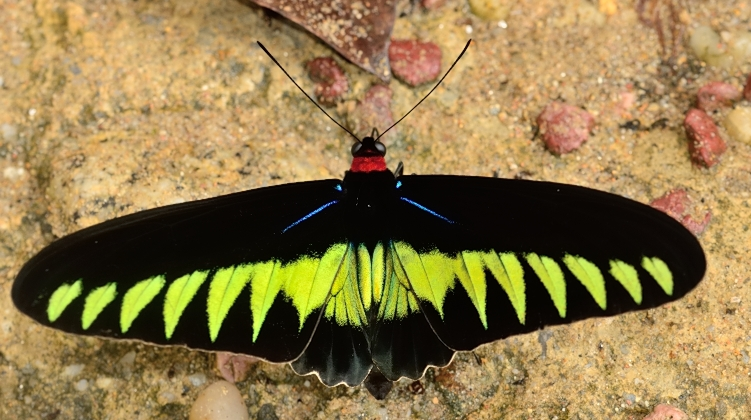
Trogonoptera brookiana

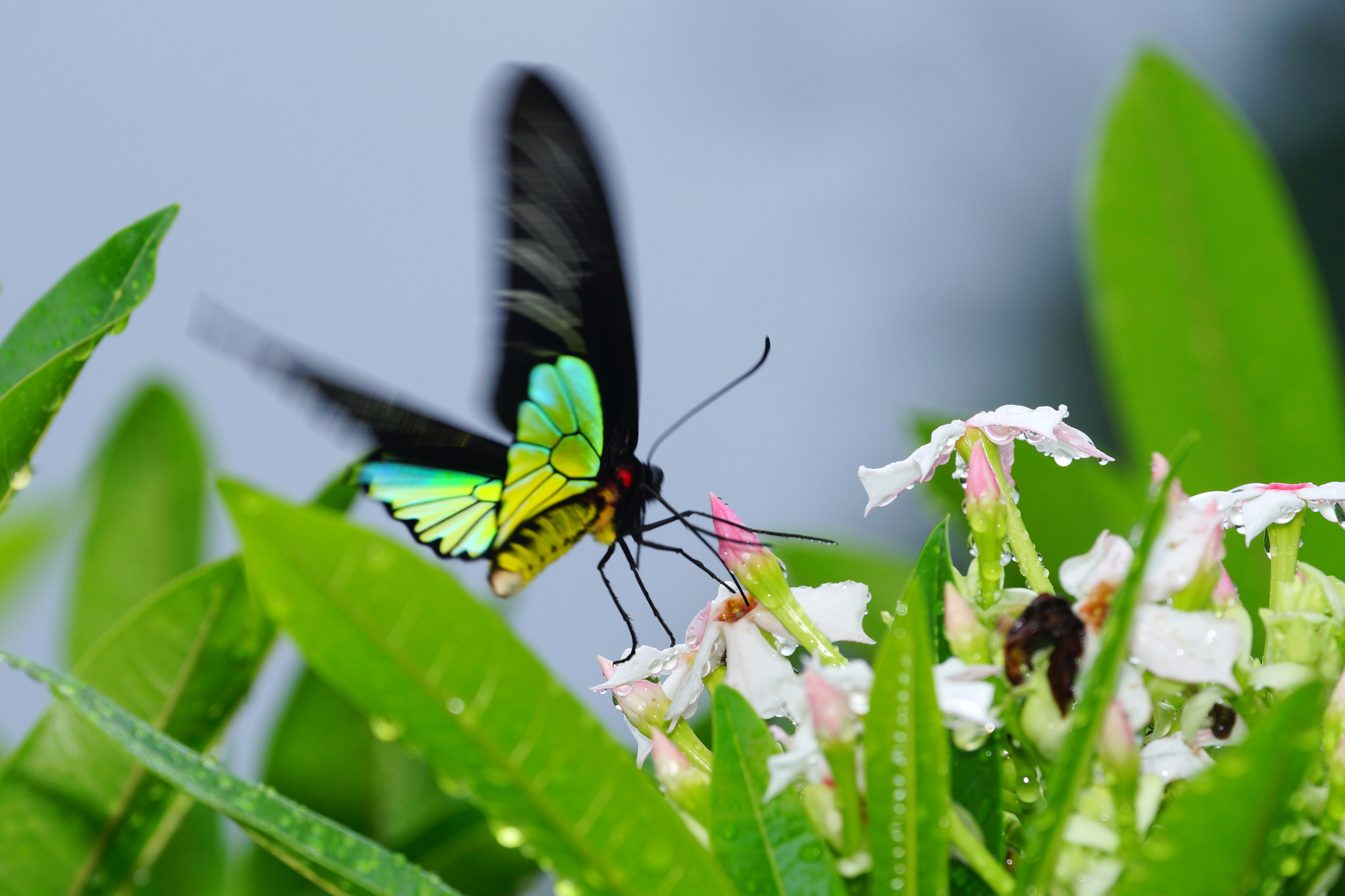
Troides magellanus

== Citations ==
- Pinheiro, Carlos E. G. (1996): Palatability and escaping ability in Neotropical butterflies: tests with wild kingbirds (Tyrannus melancholicus, Tyrannidae). Biological Journal of the Linnean Society 59(4): 351–365. HTML abstract
- Scott, James A. (1986): The Butterflies of North America. Stanford University Press. ISBN 0-8047-1205-0
