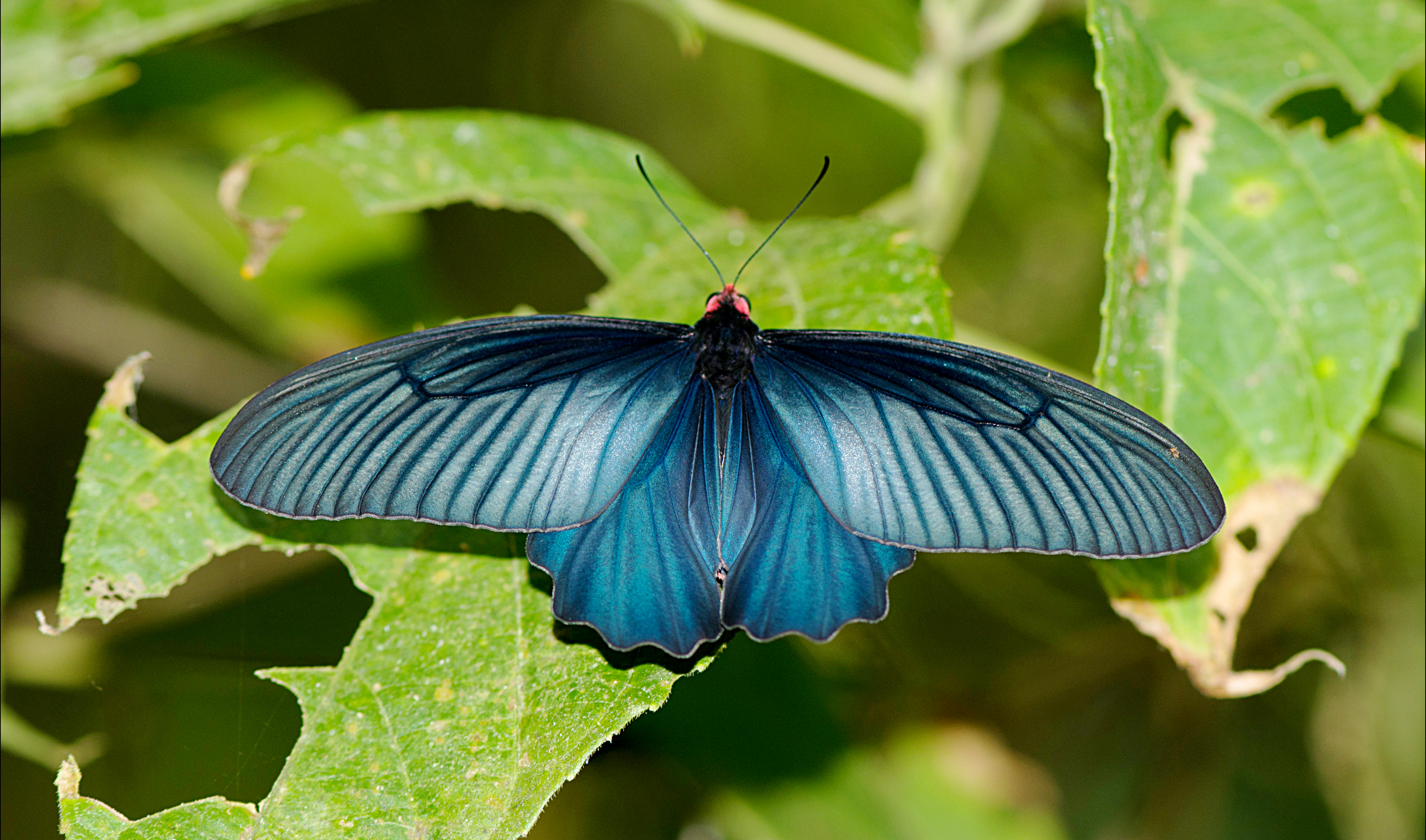

Scientific classification
- Kingdom: Animalia
- Phylum: Arthropoda
- Clade: Pancrustacea
- Class: Insecta
- Order: Lepidoptera
- Family: Papilionidae
- Genus: Atrophaneura
- Species: A. astorion
- Subspecies: A. a. varuna

Trinomial name
- Atrophaneura astorion varuna (White, 1842)

= Atrophaneura astorion varuna =

Common batwing

Species of butterfly

Atrophaneura astorion varuna, the common batwing, is a butterfly found in India and Southeast Asia that belongs to the swallowtail family, and more specifically, the batwings group of Atrophaneura, comprising tailless black swallowtail butterflies.

== Range ==
Eastern Nepal, northern India (from Kumaon to Sikkim), Bangladesh, Myanmar, Thailand, northern Laos, northern Vietnam, possibly China (Hainan).

== Status ==
The butterfly is not rare across most of its range.

== Description ==
- Wingspan: 88 to 136 mm.
- Male: Tailless. Above, the butterfly is bluish black and unmarked.

It has a scent patch in a rounded black-brown dorsal fold. When the fold is opened, the white lower half of the scent patch can be seen.

- The abdomen has white stripes. The head of the butterfly is rose coloured.
- Female: Tailless. Above, the butterfly is grey brown. It has dark stripes in between the veins. It has a large pale patch below vein 2 on the upper forewing.

Male: Upperside rich velvety blue black. Forewing: outwardly towards the terminal margin and the whole of the hindwing except the dorsal area have in certain lights a rich dark purple bloom, in others a very dark green; dorsal area and the whole inner side of the sexual fold opaque brownish black; outer half of forewing with pale adnervular streaks more or less prominent. Underside similar; forewing with the adnervular pale streaks broader, more prominent, extended further inwards well up to the terminal margin. Hindwing: ground colour more uniform blue black than on the upperside. Antennae, head, thorax and abdomen black; the head, in front, on the sides and beneath, the sides of the thorax and of the abdomen rich crimson; beneath, the thorax and abdomen black, the latter with lateral black spots in addition on its crimson sides.

Female: Upperside dull black. Forewing with the pale greyish-green streaks very broad and prominent, especially in interspaces 1 and 2, the streaks extend also into the cell. Hindwing more uniform, with a dark dull blue, in some lights dark green, bloom. Underside similar, the streaks on the forewing broader and paler; hindwing as on the upperside, more uniform, duller, opaque. Antennae and thorax black, abdomen dull brownish black, head crimson; beneath as in the male, but the crimson less bright, especially on the sides of the abdomen and without the lateral spots on the latter.

In Sikkim, according to Henry John Elwes and Lionel de Nicéville, it occurs from quite low elevations in the Terai up to 7,000 feet (2,100 m). Its almost uniform dark colour renders it inconspicuous in the jungle, and it is therefore difficult to account for its being further protected by a disagreeable smell and probably taste. James Wood-Mason has recorded that the females have a strong and disgustingly rank musky odour.

== Habitat ==
The Common Batwing occurs from the Terai up to the altitude of 7000 feet.

== Habits ==
The common batwing is a butterfly of hot, low altitude jungles. It has a slow and graceful flight and can be seen cruising along river valleys and high over stream beds. Both sexes frequent flowers, Lantana being a preferred species. It has a disagreeable smell.

== Food plants ==
- Family Aristolochiaceae
  - Aristolochia kaempferi

== Etymology ==
It is named for the sky god Varuna in Vedic religion. (Sanskrit Varuṇa वरुण, Malay: Baruna or Waruna.)
