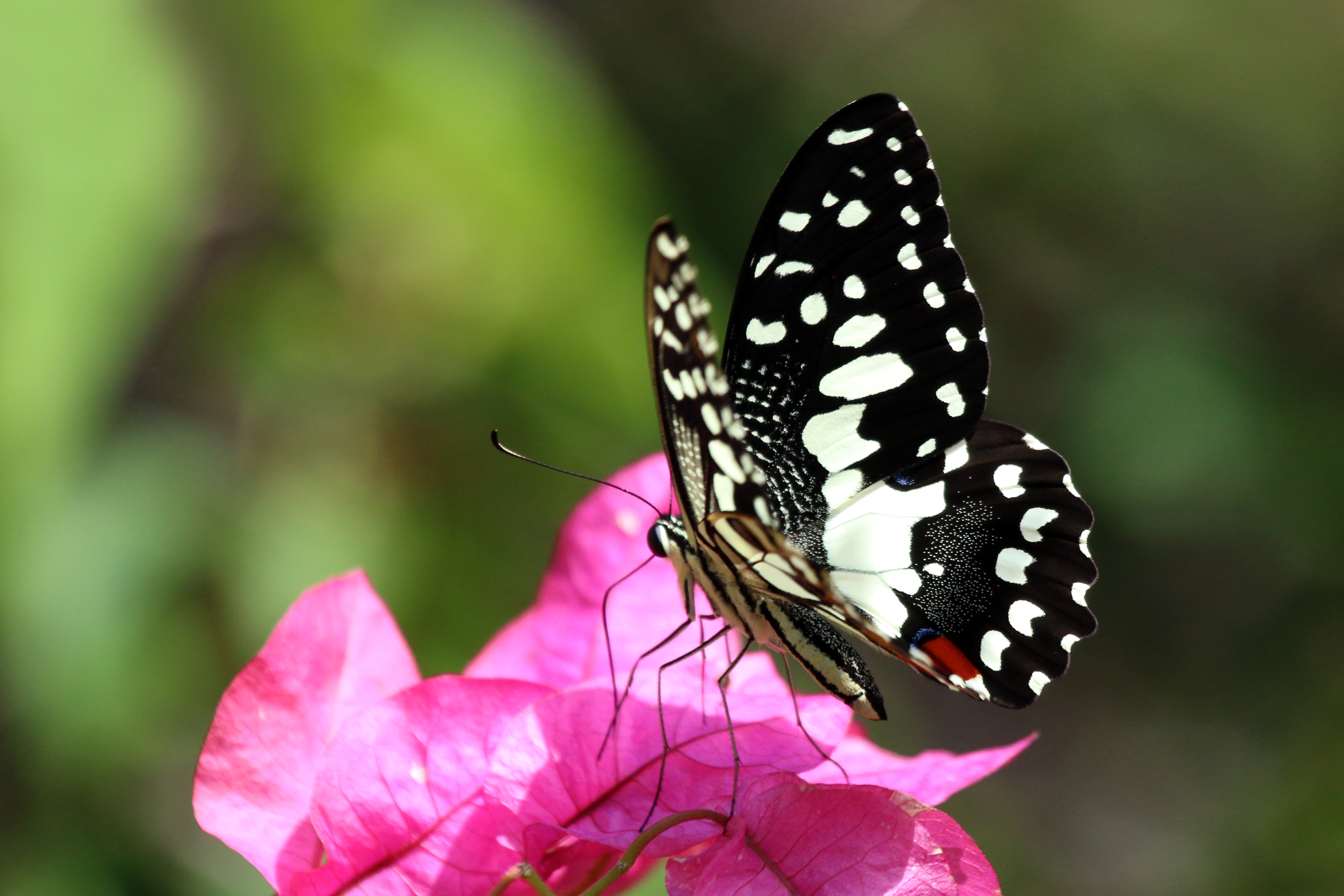
- Lime butterfly (Papilio demoleus)
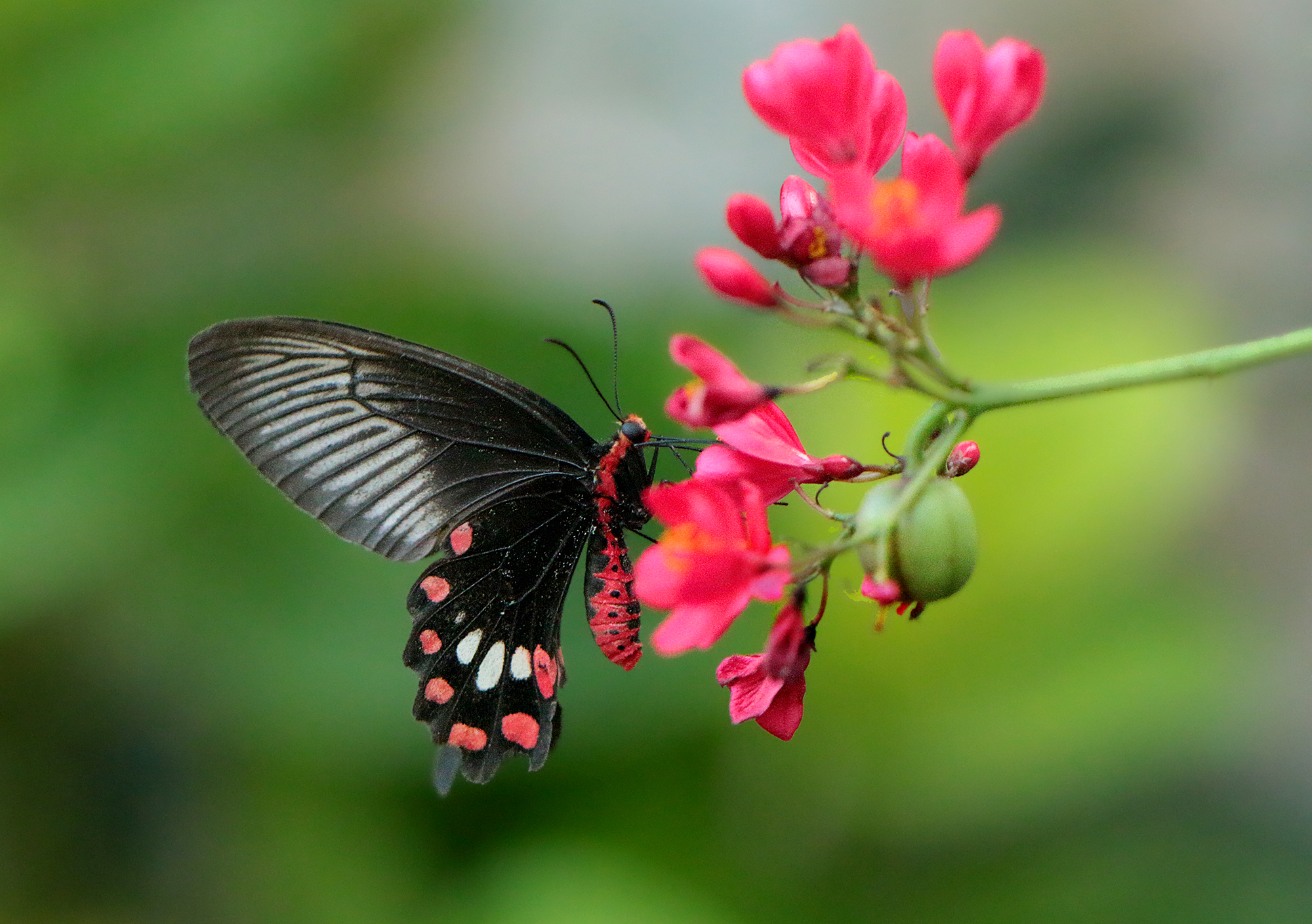
- Common rose (Pachliopta aristolochiae)

Scientific classification
- Kingdom: Animalia
- Phylum: Arthropoda
- Clade: Pancrustacea
- Class: Insecta
- Order: Lepidoptera
- Family: Papilionidae
- Subfamily: Papilioninae; Latreille, 1802

Tribes
- Leptocircini Papilionini Troidini Teinopalpini

= Papilioninae =

Subfamily of butterflies

Papilioninae is a subfamily of the butterfly family Papilionidae. Papilioninae are swallowtail butterflies and are found worldwide, but most species are distributed in the tropics and warmer regions. This subfamily was classified in 1895 by Rothschild and Jordan.

== Tribes ==
This subfamily consists of four tribes:

- Leptocircini
- Papilionini
- Troidini
- Teinopalpini

== Morphological characteristics ==
The shared morphological characteristics differentiating the papilioninae subfamily from others include

- Scaling and Structure of antennae and legs
- Structure of palpi
- Wing venation, pattern, and pigmentation
  - Dorsal bristles on males hind wing
  - Basal Spur on front wing
- Larvae foodplant association
- Geographical Association

Note that scaling, antennae structure, leg structure, and palpi structure are based mainly on specific genes that are specific to papilioninae (more information can be found in references).

== Food and habitat ==
Specific species food preferences change and expand based on availability and species ranges. Papilioninae can survive in majority of habitat types, including tropics, alpine, and even subarctic.

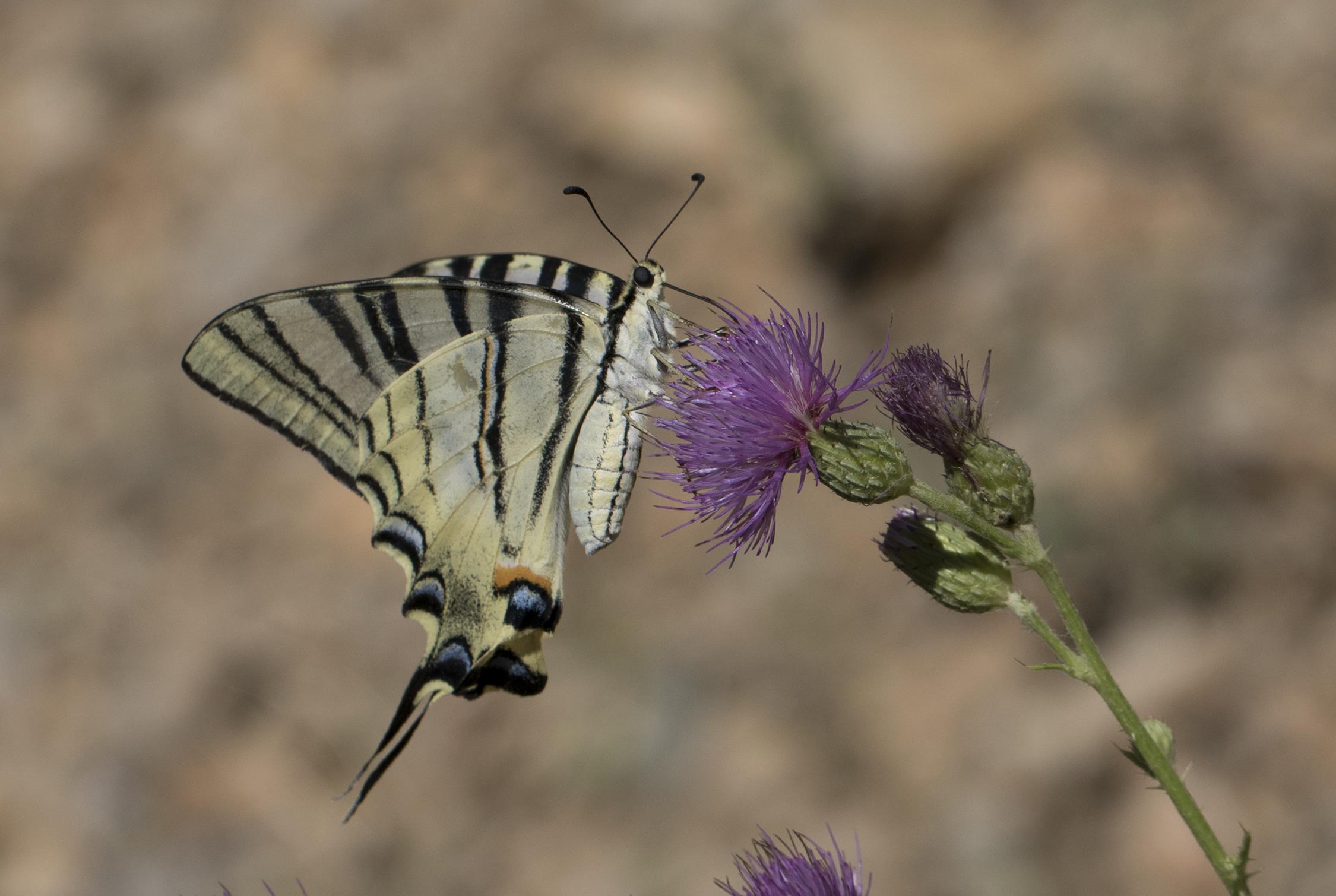

Larvae hatch and remain on a host plant, called a food-plant, until their adult stage. Papilioninae feed on many host plants families that are within their range. There is a very broad range of host plant preferences, which may be the reason this subfamily has been very evolutionarily successful. More specialized feeding and plant preferences occur within species in more tropical regions with more plant diversity and availability.

== Geographical ranges ==
Species richness is greatest in more tropical regions. Food plant preferences and availability, as well as competition also impact the areas species inhabit. However, species within this subfamily exist between the latitudes 70 and -40. Richness is highest between the latitudes 10 and -20 with a drop in richness along the -10 degree latitude. Presence differs depending on food availability and food plant availability for larvae.
