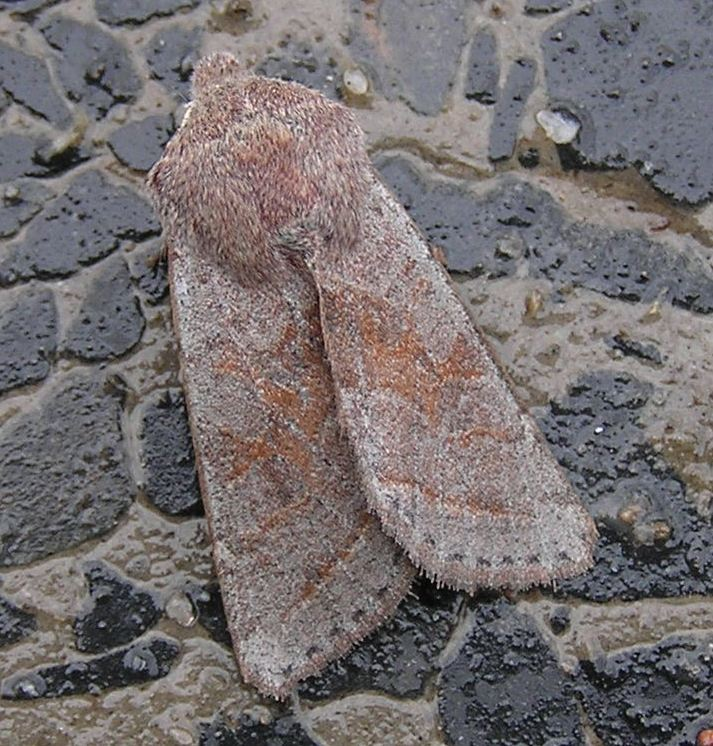

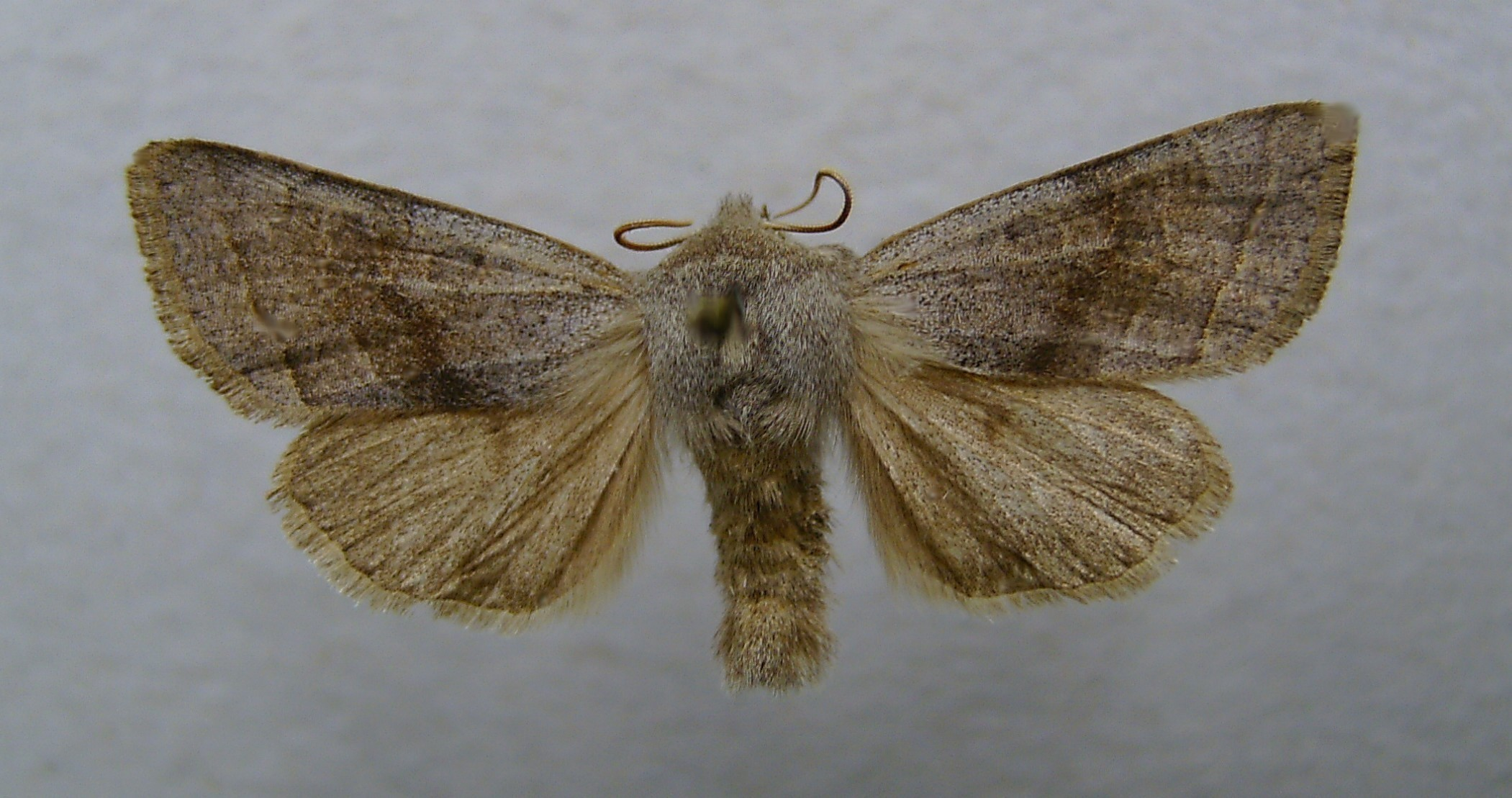

Scientific classification
- Kingdom: Animalia
- Phylum: Arthropoda
- Clade: Pancrustacea
- Class: Insecta
- Order: Lepidoptera
- Superfamily: Noctuoidea
- Family: Noctuidae
- Genus: Orthosia
- Species: O. opima

Binomial name
- Orthosia opima (Hübner, 1809)

Synonyms
- Noctua opima Hübner, [1809]; Noctua firma Hübner, [1822]

= Orthosia opima =

Northern drab

Species of moth

Orthosia opima, the northern drab, is a moth of the family Noctuidae. The species was first described by Jacob Hübner in 1809. It is found from central and northern Europe east to central Asia. In the west and north it is found from France through Great Britain up to southern Fennoscandia, south from the Alps up to the Balkans.

== Technical description and variation ==
The wingspan is 34–40 mm. Forewing dull lilac grey speckled with darker: inner and outer lines purplish brown, the median area either filled with brown or with a broad brown median shade; submarginal line broadly pale with dark line before it, nearly straight; upper stigmata large, outlined with pale: hindwing dull brownish grey. Distinguished from O. incerta by the straighter costa and more produced apex of forewing. In this insect the continental forms are darker than those found in Britain, of which the commonest is ab. grisea Tutt with pale ochreous-grey ground with the pale edges of stigmata strongly marked and broad submarginal line; — brunnea Tutt has the whole wing brownish, but the edges of stigmata and the submarginal line still pale; — but in unicolor Tutt the whole wing is brown.

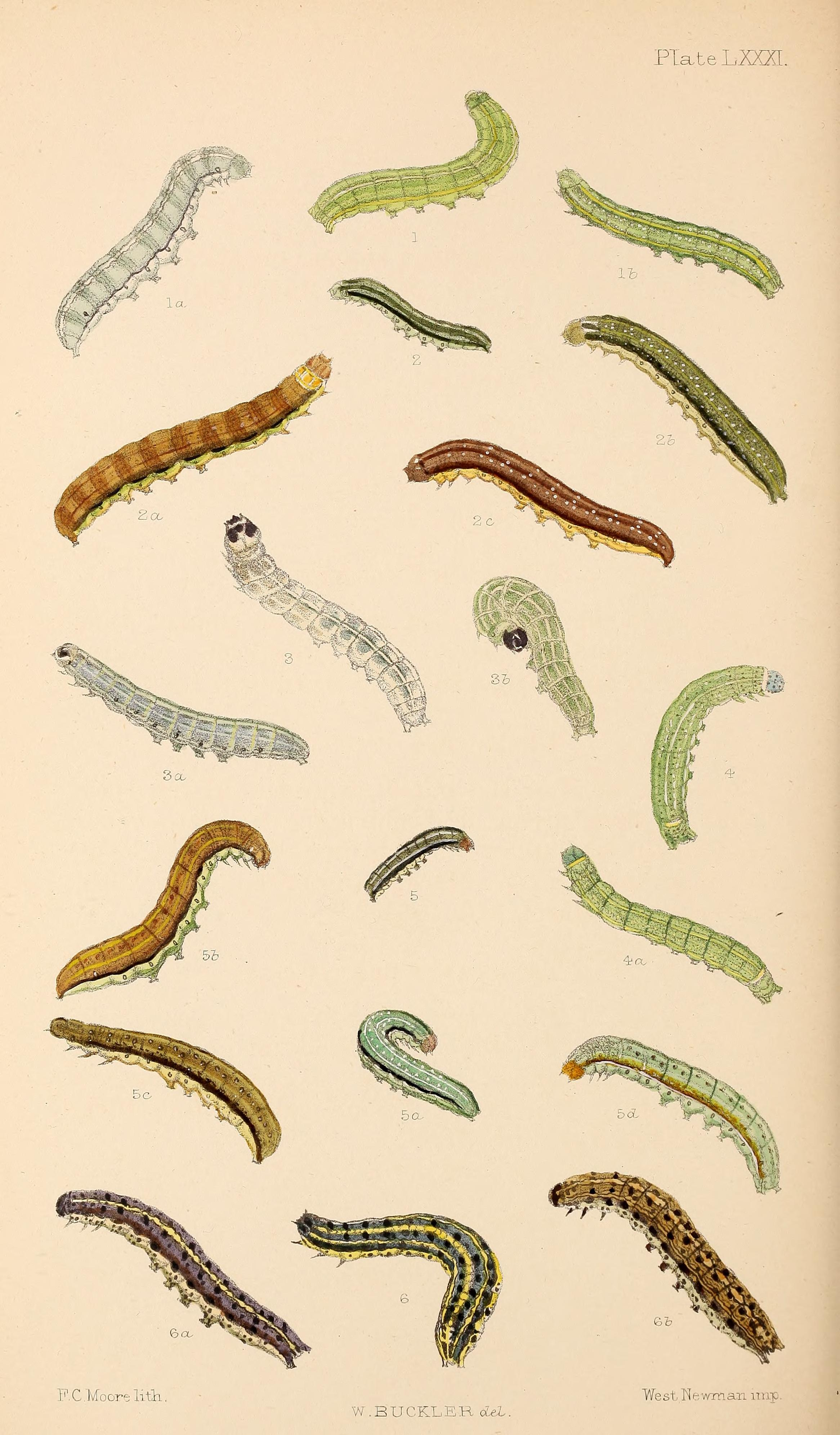
Figs.2, 2a, 2b, 2 c larva after last moult

== Biology ==
Adults are on wing from March to May.

Larva purplish brown above, yellowish green below; dorsal and subdorsal lines finely pale; spiracular line broad, dark brown above, becoming yellowish red below; spiracles pale, black ringed. The larvae feed on Salix caprea, Berberis thunbergii, Fagus, Quercus, Populus, Prunus spinosa and Vaccinium.
