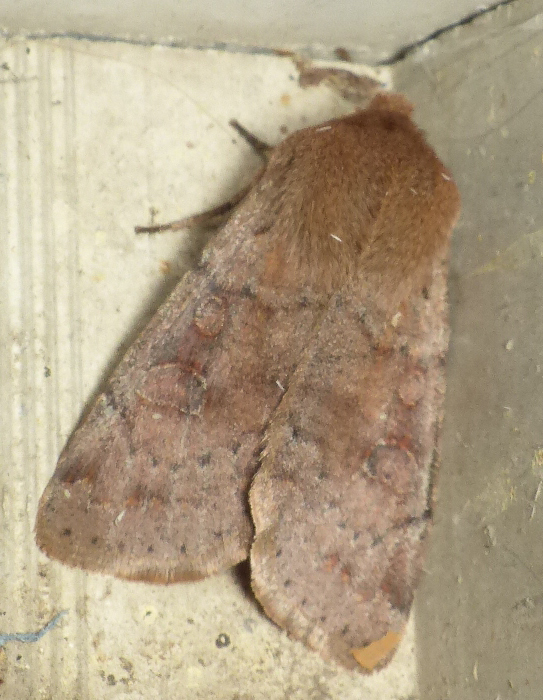
- Orthosia alurina, New York

Scientific classification
- Kingdom: Animalia
- Phylum: Arthropoda
- Clade: Pancrustacea
- Class: Insecta
- Order: Lepidoptera
- Superfamily: Noctuoidea
- Family: Noctuidae
- Tribe: Orthosiini
- Genus: Orthosia
- Species: O. alurina

Binomial name
- Orthosia alurina (Smith, 1902)

= Orthosia alurina =

Species of moth

Orthosia alurina, the gray Quaker, is a species of cutworm or dart moth in the family Noctuidae. It is found in North America.

The MONA or Hodges number for Orthosia alurina is 10491.
