= Orthosia ferrigera =

Scientific classification
- Kingdom: Animalia
- Phylum: Arthropoda
- Clade: Pancrustacea
- Class: Insecta
- Order: Lepidoptera
- Superfamily: Noctuoidea
- Family: Noctuidae
- Tribe: Orthosiini
- Genus: Orthosia
- Species: O. ferrigera

Binomial name
- Orthosia ferrigera (Smith, 1894)

Species of moth

Orthosia ferrigera is a species of cutworm or dart moth in the family Noctuidae. It is found in North America.

The MONA or Hodges number for Orthosia ferrigera is 10482.
