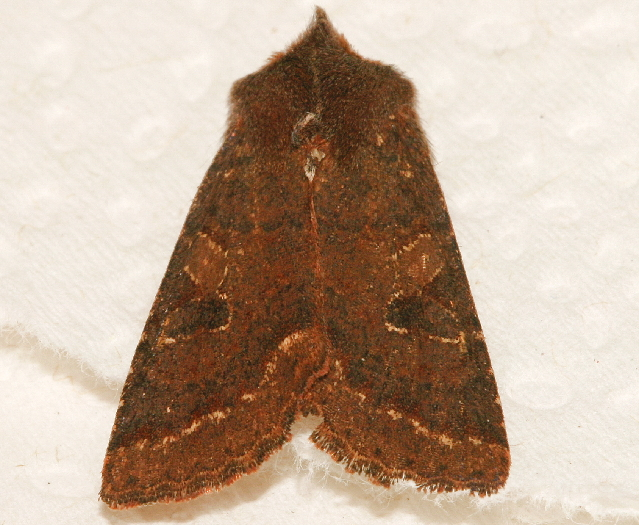

Scientific classification
- Kingdom: Animalia
- Phylum: Arthropoda
- Clade: Pancrustacea
- Class: Insecta
- Order: Lepidoptera
- Superfamily: Noctuoidea
- Family: Noctuidae
- Genus: Orthosia
- Species: O. praeses

Binomial name
- Orthosia praeses (Grote, 1879)

= Orthosia praeses =

Species of moth

Orthosia praeses is a species of cutworm or dart moth in the family Noctuidae. It is found in North America.

The MONA or Hodges number for Orthosia praeses is 10480.
