= Orthosia erythrolita =

Scientific classification
- Kingdom: Animalia
- Phylum: Arthropoda
- Clade: Pancrustacea
- Class: Insecta
- Order: Lepidoptera
- Superfamily: Noctuoidea
- Family: Noctuidae
- Genus: Orthosia
- Species: O. erythrolita

Binomial name
- Orthosia erythrolita (Grote, 1879)

Species of moth

Orthosia erythrolita is a species of cutworm or dart moth in the family Noctuidae. It is found in North America.

The MONA or Hodges number for Orthosia erythrolita is 10477.
