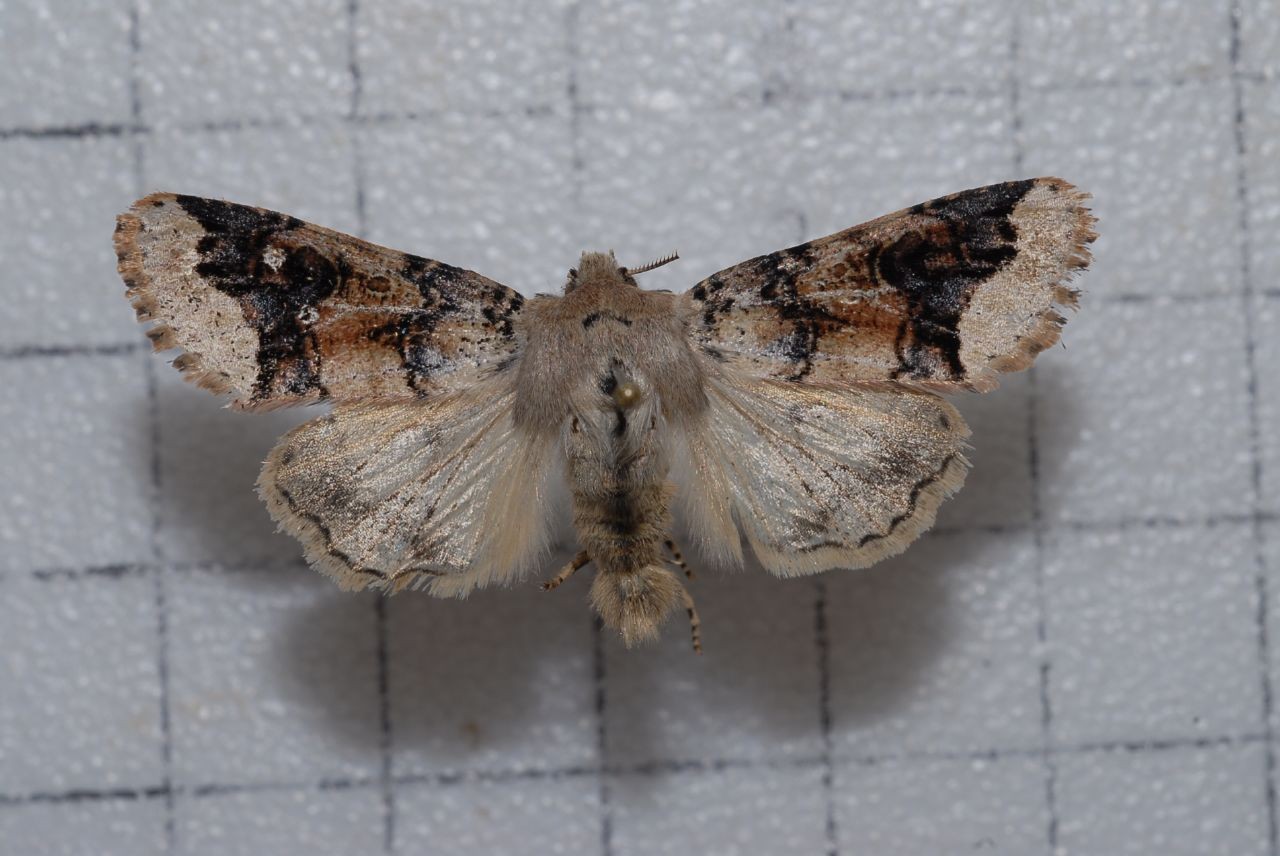

Scientific classification
- Kingdom: Animalia
- Phylum: Arthropoda
- Clade: Pancrustacea
- Class: Insecta
- Order: Lepidoptera
- Superfamily: Noctuoidea
- Family: Noctuidae
- Genus: Orthosia
- Species: O. limbata

Binomial name
- Orthosia limbata (Butler, 1879)

Synonyms
- Apamea limbata Butler, 1879

= Orthosia limbata =

Species of moth

Orthosia limbata is a moth of the family Noctuidae. It is found in Korea, Japan, China, Taiwan and Nepal.

The wingspan is about 38 mm.

== Subspecies ==
- Orthosia limbata limbata (Korea, Japan, China)
- Orthosia limbata himalaya Hreblay & Ronkay, 1998 (Nepal)
- Orthosia limbata atrata Hreblay & Ronkay, 1998
