= Orthosia segregata =

Scientific classification
- Kingdom: Animalia
- Phylum: Arthropoda
- Clade: Pancrustacea
- Class: Insecta
- Order: Lepidoptera
- Superfamily: Noctuoidea
- Family: Noctuidae
- Tribe: Orthosiini
- Genus: Orthosia
- Species: O. segregata

Binomial name
- Orthosia segregata (Smith, 1893)

Species of moth

Orthosia segregata is a species of cutworm or dart moth in the family Noctuidae.

The MONA or Hodges number for Orthosia segregata is 10493.
