= Orthosia behrensiana =

Scientific classification
- Kingdom: Animalia
- Phylum: Arthropoda
- Clade: Pancrustacea
- Class: Insecta
- Order: Lepidoptera
- Superfamily: Noctuoidea
- Family: Noctuidae
- Genus: Orthosia
- Species: O. behrensiana

Binomial name
- Orthosia behrensiana (Grote, 1875)

Synonyms
- Orthosia macona (Smith, 1908)

Species of moth

Orthosia behrensiana is a species of cutworm or dart moth in the family Noctuidae. It is found in North America.

The MONA or Hodges number for Orthosia behrensiana is 10485.
