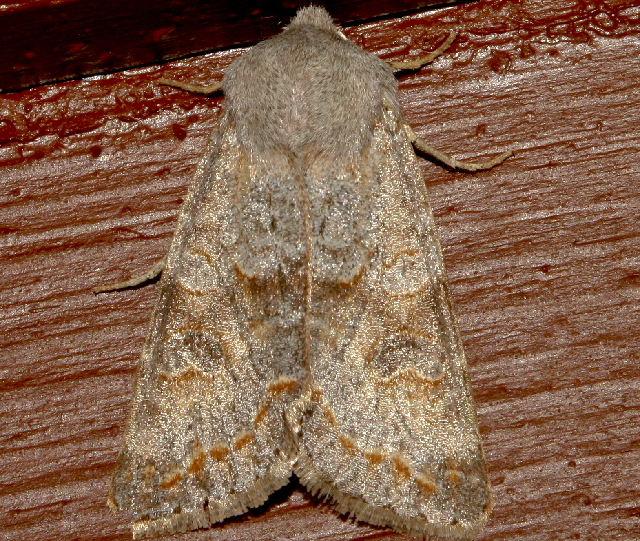

Scientific classification
- Kingdom: Animalia
- Phylum: Arthropoda
- Clade: Pancrustacea
- Class: Insecta
- Order: Lepidoptera
- Superfamily: Noctuoidea
- Family: Noctuidae
- Genus: Orthosia
- Species: O. revicta

Binomial name
- Orthosia revicta (Morrison, 1876)

= Orthosia revicta =

Species of moth

Orthosia revicta, known generally as the subdued Quaker or rusty whitesided caterpillar, is a species of cutworm or dart moth in the family Noctuidae. It is found in North America.

The MONA or Hodges number for Orthosia revicta is 10490.
