= Orthosia franzhoferi =

Scientific classification
- Domain: Eukaryota
- Kingdom: Animalia
- Phylum: Arthropoda
- Class: Insecta
- Order: Lepidoptera
- Superfamily: Noctuoidea
- Family: Noctuidae
- Genus: Orthosia
- Species: O. franzhoferi

Binomial name
- Orthosia franzhoferi Gyulai, 2019

Species of moth

Orthosia franzhoferi is a species of moth in the family Noctuidae found in Vietnam.

== Description ==
This species is sister to Orthosia huberti huberti (which almost shares the type locality), Orthosia huberti marci (found in China), and Orthosia yelai (also found in China), making them quite similar. O. franzhoferi is most similar to O. yelai when examining the female genitalia (male is unknown), but externally, O. huberti is most similar. The wings of O. franzhoferi are pale and uniformly colored with minuscule, spread-out dark dots, while the other three taxa have conspicuous markings. O. huberti has conspicuous dark markings, and O. yelai has conspicuous light markings. In damaged specimens, examination of the genitalia may be required. Here, the papillae anales (the two plates at the very end of the genitalia) are quite large, broad, and plumose (hairy). The apophyses anteriores (the two "rat tails" extending farthest from the papillae anales) and apophyses posteriores (the two "rat tails" closest to the papillae anales) are quite long relative to those of the other species. These characteristics alone can distinguish O. franzhoferi from the three other taxa.

== Distribution and ecology ==
The holotype specimen, a female and currently the only known specimen of this species, was found at an elevation of around 1,000 meters (approximately 3,300 feet) in the Fan-si-pan Mountain in northwestern Vietnam. The exact coordinates of the collected specimen are 22.17ºN 103.44ºE.

== Etymology ==
The specific epithet is a tribute to Mr. Franz Hofer from Baden, Austria, who donated the holotype to the author, Péter Gyulai.
