= Orthosia pacifica =

- Illustration of Orthosia pacifica

Scientific classification
- Kingdom: Animalia
- Phylum: Arthropoda
- Clade: Pancrustacea
- Class: Insecta
- Order: Lepidoptera
- Superfamily: Noctuoidea
- Family: Noctuidae
- Tribe: Orthosiini
- Genus: Orthosia
- Species: O. pacifica

Binomial name
- Orthosia pacifica (Harvey, 1874)

Synonyms
- Taeniocampa pacifica (Harvey, 1874); Monima pacifica (Hampson, 1905)

Species of moth

Orthosia pacifica is a species of cutworm or dart moth in the family Noctuidae. It is found in western North America.

Adults are gray-brown. The fore-wings are light brown with darker brown and black markings. The hind-wings are whitish with darker markings. Larvae are green with white dorsal lines and markings.

The MONA or Hodges number for Orthosia pacifica is 10494.
