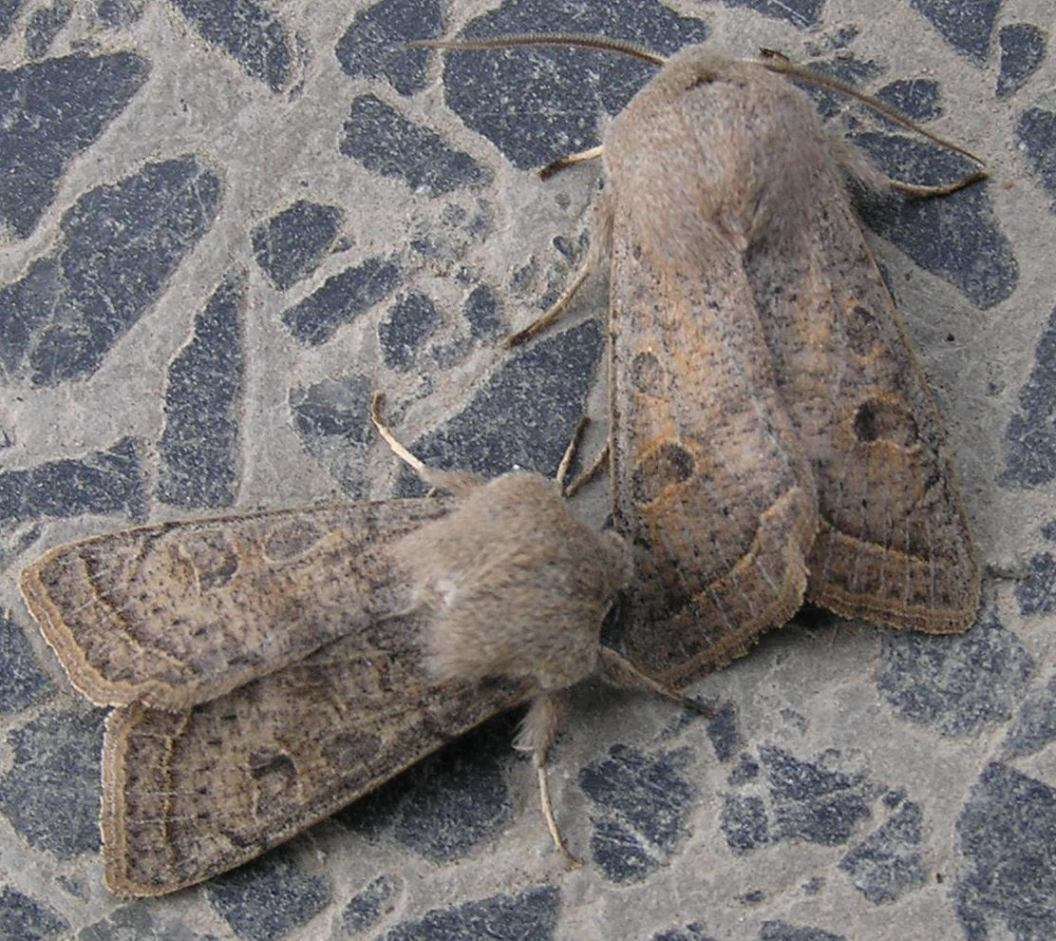

Scientific classification
- Kingdom: Animalia
- Phylum: Arthropoda
- Clade: Pancrustacea
- Class: Insecta
- Order: Lepidoptera
- Superfamily: Noctuoidea
- Family: Noctuidae
- Genus: Orthosia
- Species: O. gracilis

Binomial name
- Orthosia gracilis (Denis & Schiffermüller, 1775)

Synonyms
- Phalaena (Noctua) gracilis [Schiffermüller], 1775; Phalaena (Noctua) lepida Brahm, 1791; Bombyx sparsus Haworth, 1803

= Orthosia gracilis =

Species of moth

Orthosia gracilis, the powdered Quaker, is a moth of the family Noctuidae. It is found in all of Europe except the extreme north and south, then east across the Palearctic to Northern Asia and Central Asia. O. g. pallidior (Staudinger, 1888) is described from Xinjiang in China.

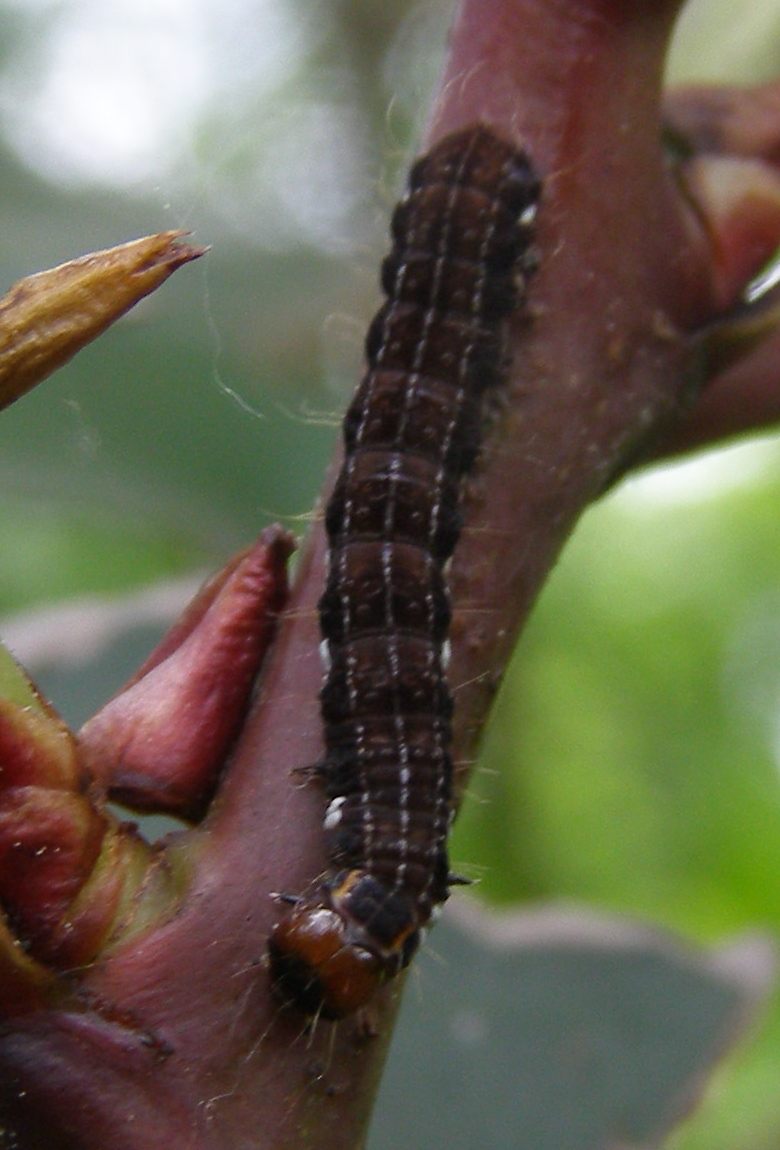
Caterpillar

== Technical description and variation ==
The wingspan is 35–40 mm. Forewing in male pale grey or ochreous grey, in female dark grey, generally more or less irrorated with dark grey; orbicular and reniform stigmata with pale outlines, filled up with grey, the lower half of reniform dark grey; outer line marked by black dots on veins, the inner mostly obsolete; submarginal line ochreous or rufous, sometimes preceded by a dark shade; hindwing in male whitish, becoming grey towards termen, and blackish immediately before the pale fringe, in female wholly grey; - pallida Stph. is a whitish form with hardly any dusting; - in rosea Tutt the ground colour is flesh coloured; - rufescens Cockll is red-brown; - the Japanese form ella Btlr.[now a full species Orthosia ella] differs only in being more strongly marked, sometimes with a red-brown flush.

== Biology ==
Adults are on wing from April to May.

The larvae feed on Myrica gale and Salix species (including Salix repens and Salix caprea). Other recorded food plants include Thalictrum flavum, Thalictrum aquilegiifolium, Ribes nigrum, Ribes rubrum, Rubus idaeus, Filipendula ulmaria, Malus domestica, Cotoneaster, Prunus cerasus, Prunus padus, Trifolium pratense, Lysimachia vulgaris, Artemisia absinthium, Artemisia vulgaris, Cirsium arvense and Taraxacum vulgare.
