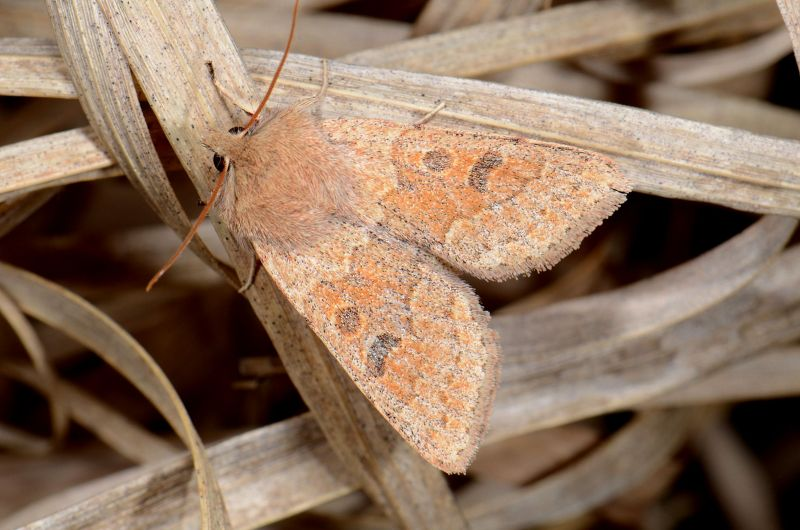

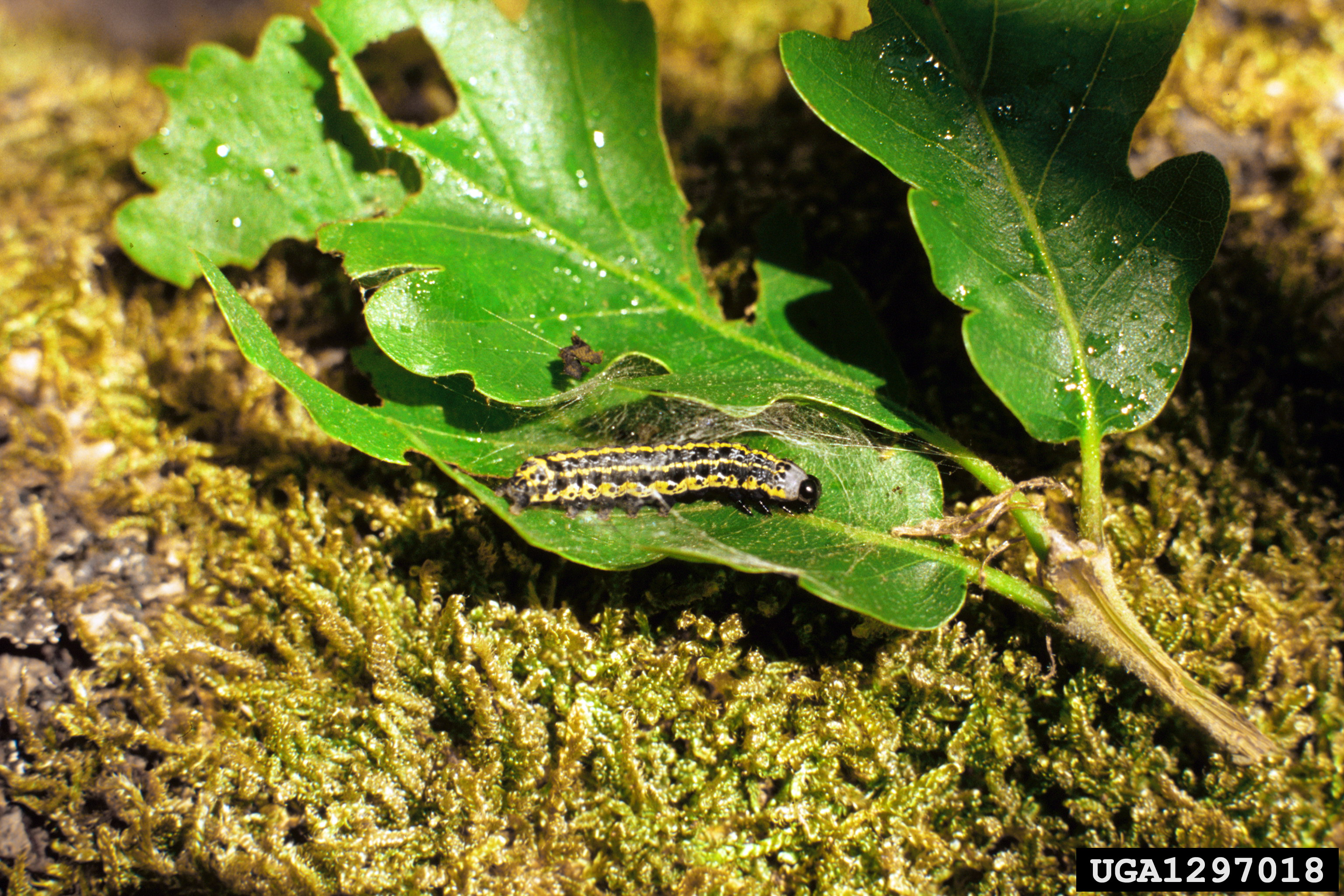

Scientific classification
- Kingdom: Animalia
- Phylum: Arthropoda
- Clade: Pancrustacea
- Class: Insecta
- Order: Lepidoptera
- Superfamily: Noctuoidea
- Family: Noctuidae
- Genus: Orthosia
- Species: O. miniosa

Binomial name
- Orthosia miniosa (Denis & Schiffermüller, 1775)

= Orthosia miniosa =

Species of moth

Orthosia miniosa, the blossom underwing, is a moth of the family Noctuidae. The species was first described by Michael Denis and Ignaz Schiffermüller in 1775. It is found in Europe.

== Technical description and variation ==
The wingspan is 31–36 mm. The length of the forewings is 15–17 mm. Forewing sandy rufous, black speckled, median area generally deeper rufous: lines browner, edged with pale, the outer dentate lunulate; stigmata with yellowish outlines and grey centres: submarginal line rufous and yellowish: hindwing white, rosy tinged along the termen; cellspot, outer line, and veins sometimes well-marked. Form rubricosa Esper is the form in which the red of the median area is most emphasised. Form pallida Tutt is greyish ochreous, with hardly a vestige of rufous: in virgata Tutt, while the basal and marginal areas are grey, the median space is rufous.

== Biology ==
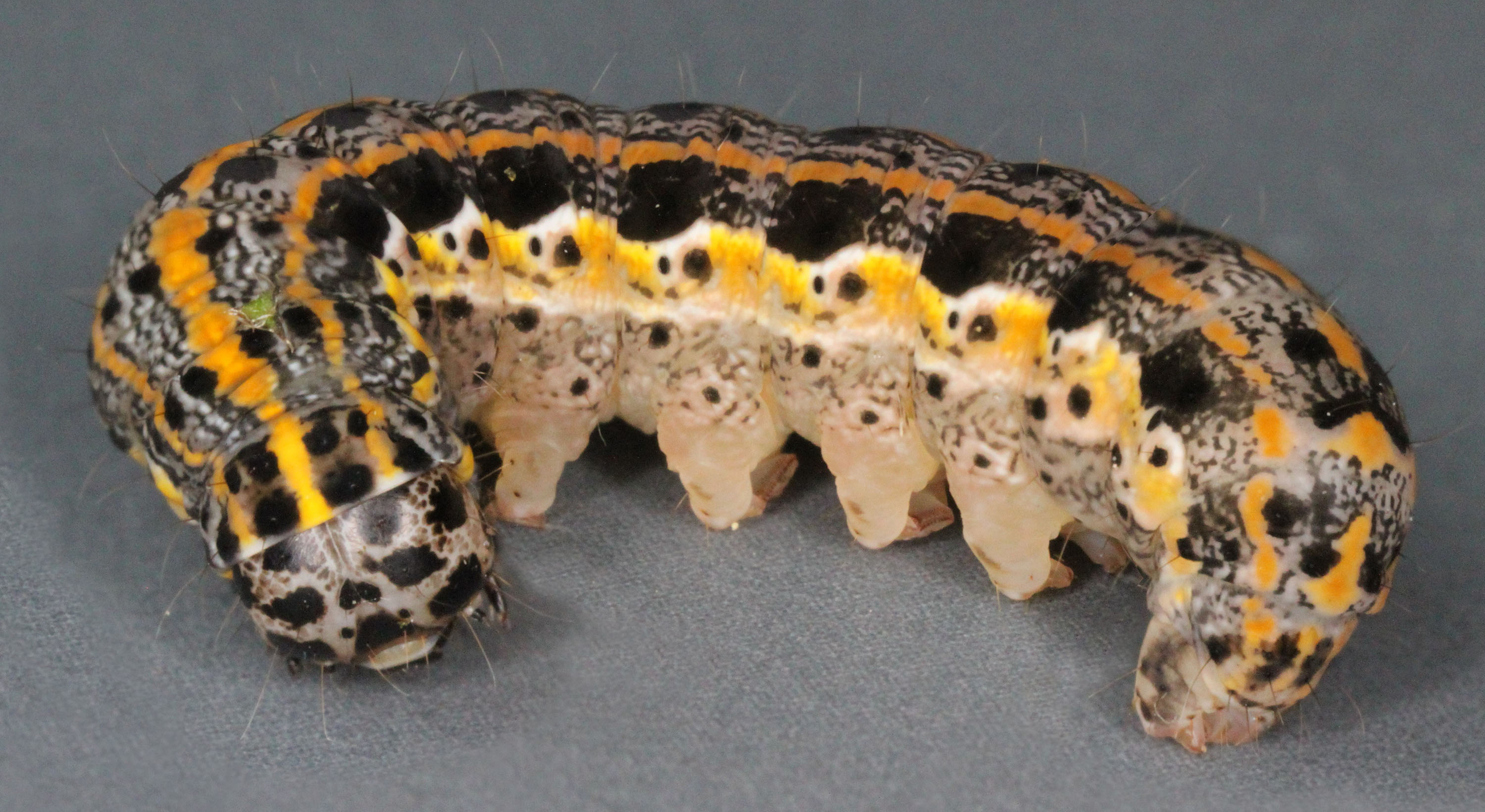
Larva

The moth flies in one generation from the end of March to mid-May.

Larva pale or dark blue grey; dorsal and subdorsal lines yellow; the sides black with a yellow spiracular line, marked with a white spot on each segment; head whitish with coarse blackish mottling. The larvae feed on various trees and shrubs, mainly oak.

== Notes ==
1. The flight season refers to Belgium and the Netherlands. This may vary in other parts of the range.
