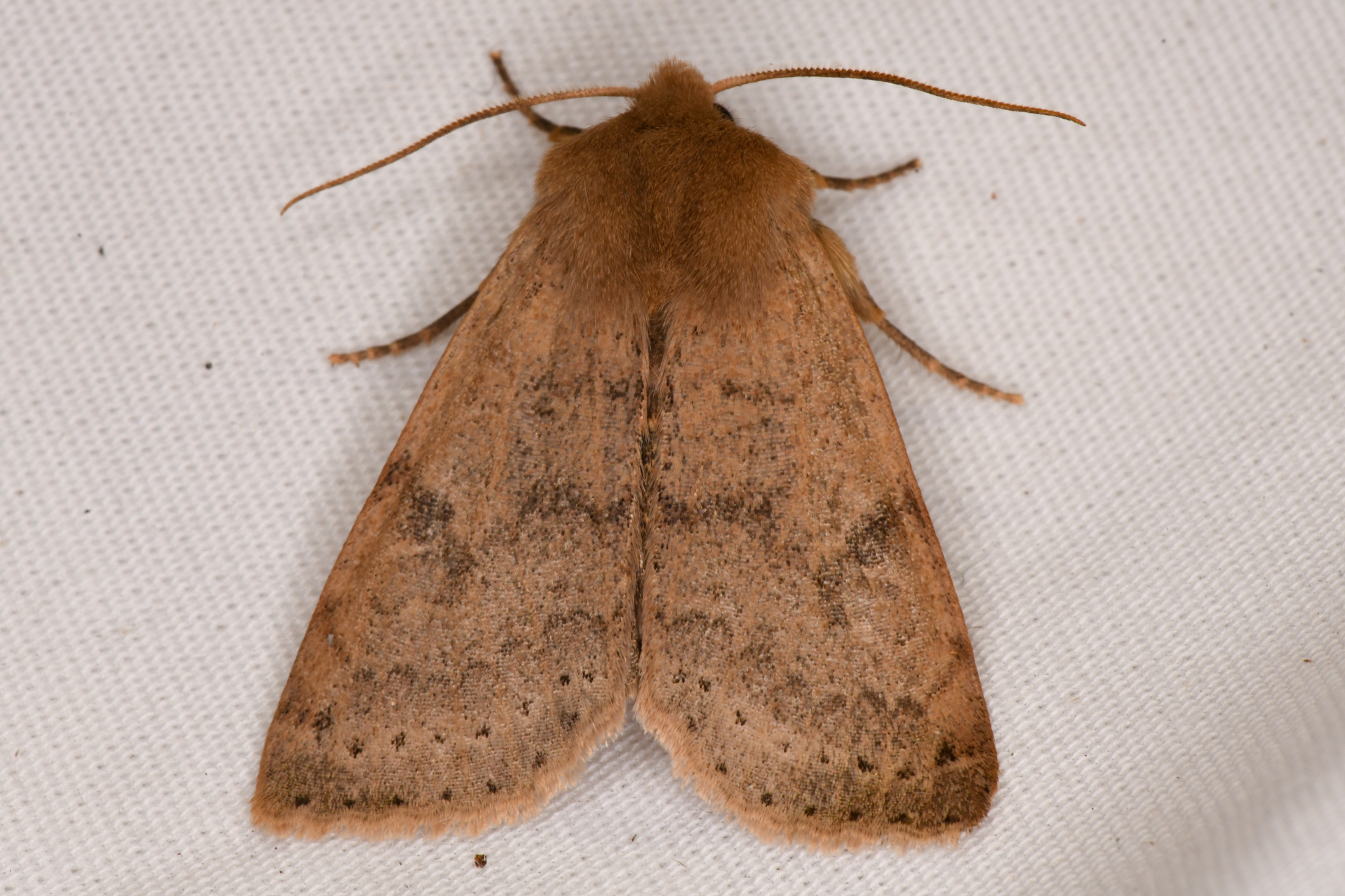

Scientific classification
- Kingdom: Animalia
- Phylum: Arthropoda
- Clade: Pancrustacea
- Class: Insecta
- Order: Lepidoptera
- Superfamily: Noctuoidea
- Family: Noctuidae
- Tribe: Orthosiini
- Genus: Orthosia
- Species: O. arthrolita

Binomial name
- Orthosia arthrolita (Harvey, 1875)

= Orthosia arthrolita =

Species of moth

Orthosia arthrolita is a species of cutworm or dart moth in the family Noctuidae. It is found in North America.
