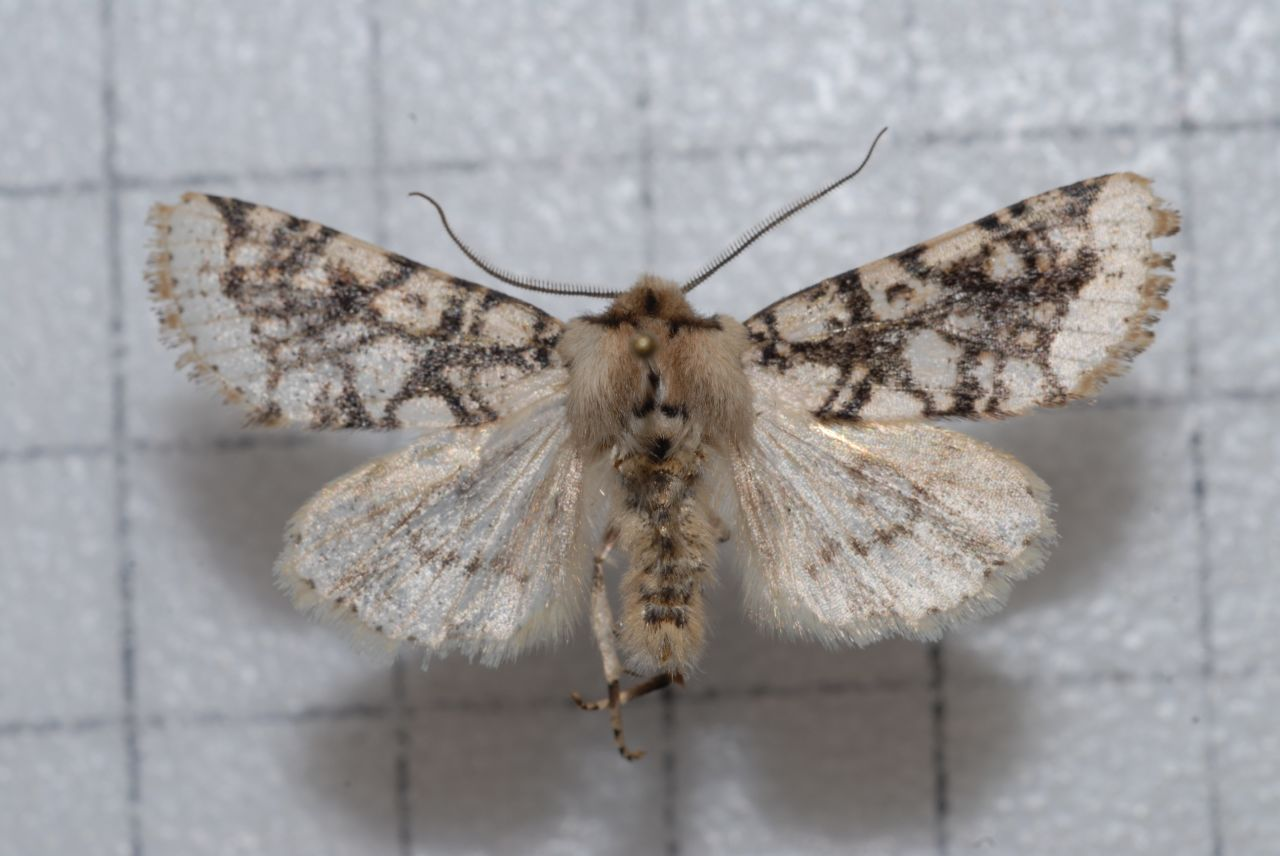
- Orthosia reticulata fuscovestita

Scientific classification
- Kingdom: Animalia
- Phylum: Arthropoda
- Clade: Pancrustacea
- Class: Insecta
- Order: Lepidoptera
- Superfamily: Noctuoidea
- Family: Noctuidae
- Genus: Orthosia
- Species: O. reticulata

Binomial name
- Orthosia reticulata Yoshimoto, 1994

= Orthosia reticulata =

Species of moth

Orthosia reticulata is a moth of the family Noctuidae. It is found in China and Taiwan.

== Subspecies ==
- Orthosia reticulata reticulata (China)
- Orthosia reticulata fuscovestita Hreblay & Ronkay, 1998 (Taiwan)
