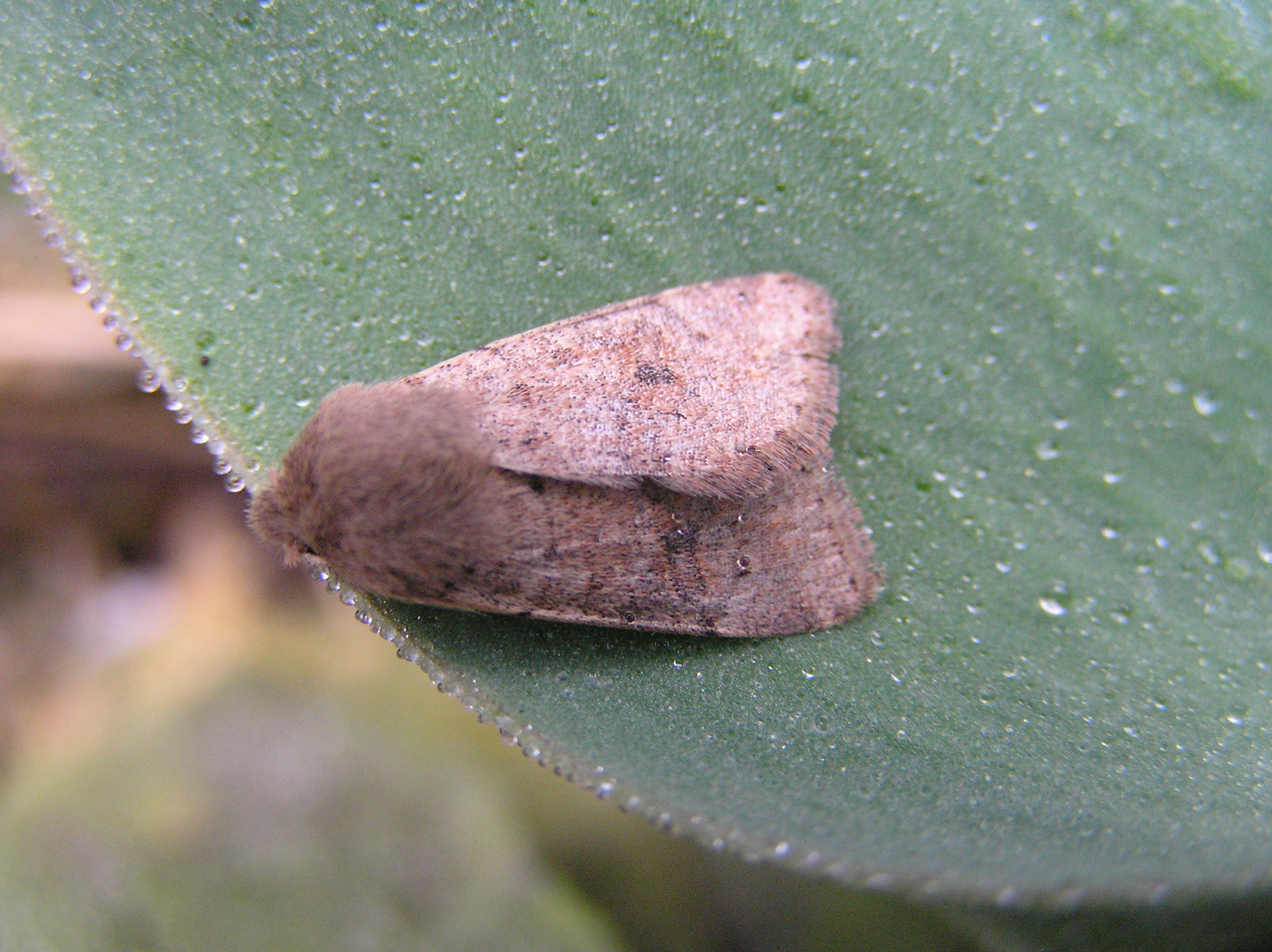

Scientific classification
- Kingdom: Animalia
- Phylum: Arthropoda
- Clade: Pancrustacea
- Class: Insecta
- Order: Lepidoptera
- Superfamily: Noctuoidea
- Family: Noctuidae
- Genus: Orthosia
- Species: O. cruda

Binomial name
- Orthosia cruda (Denis & Schiffermüller, 1775)

= Orthosia cruda =

Species of moth

Orthosia cruda, the small Quaker, is a moth of the family Noctuidae. It is found in Europe, Morocco, Algeria, Tunisia, Turkey, the Caucasus, Transcaucasia, Kazakhstan, Israel, Lebanon, Cyprus and Jordan.

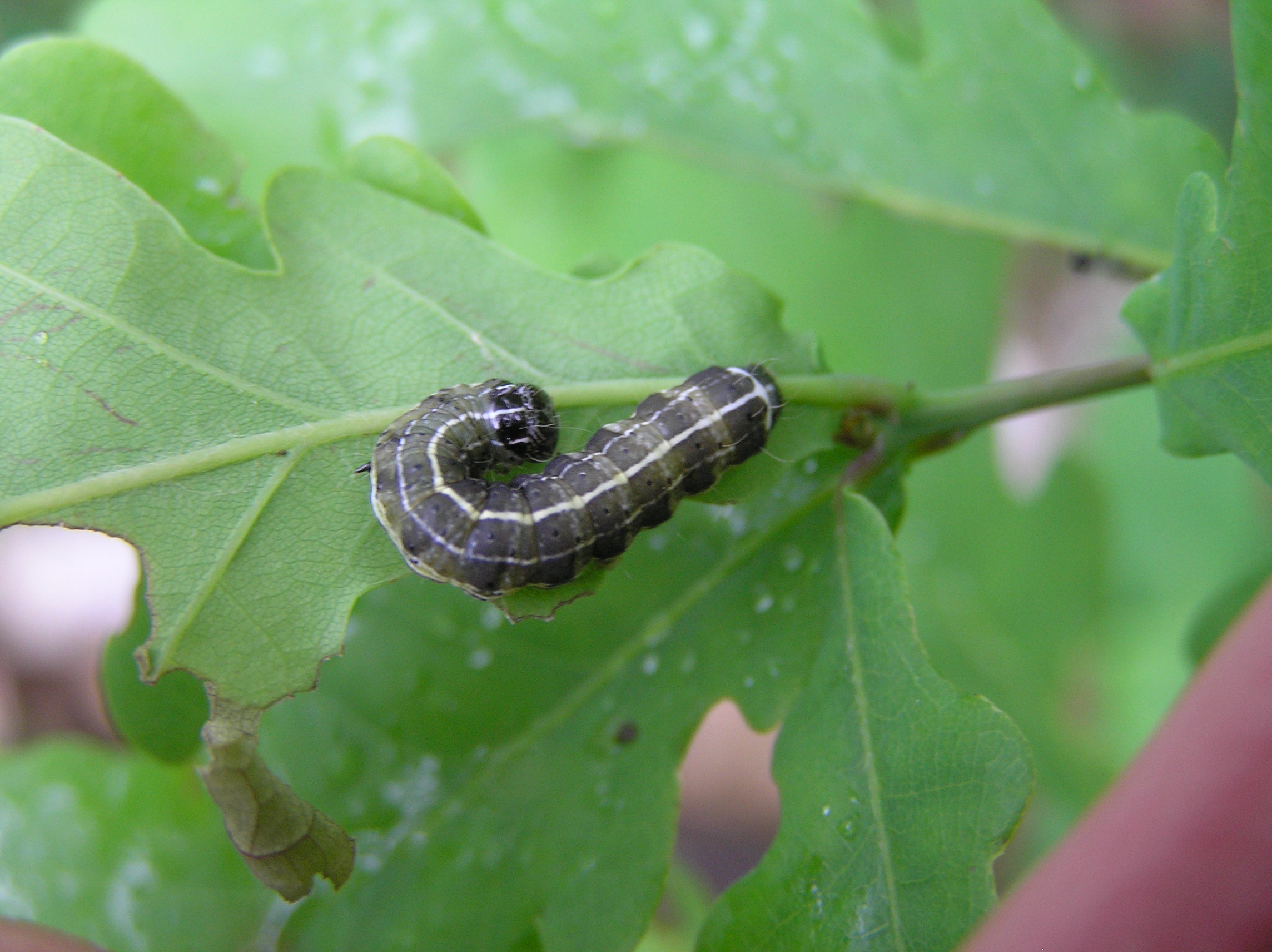

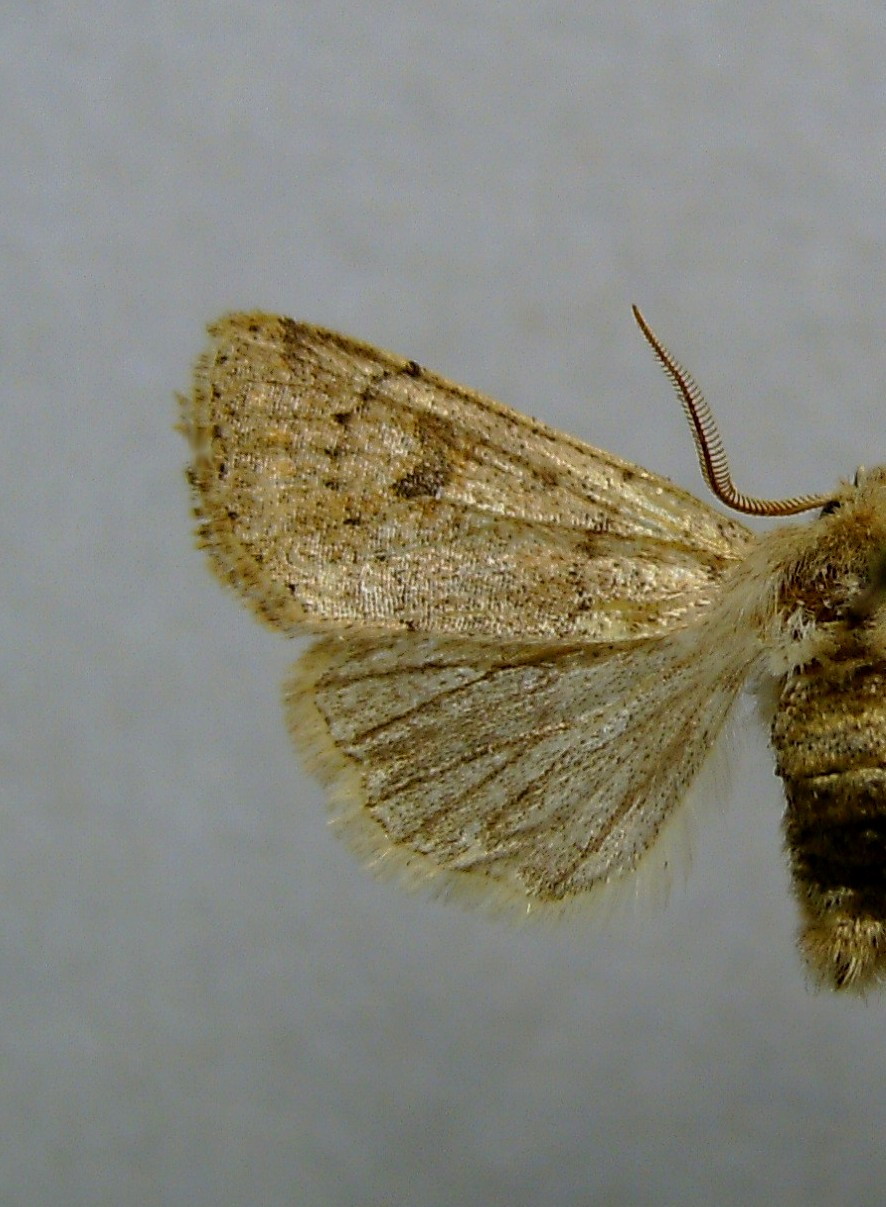
Male

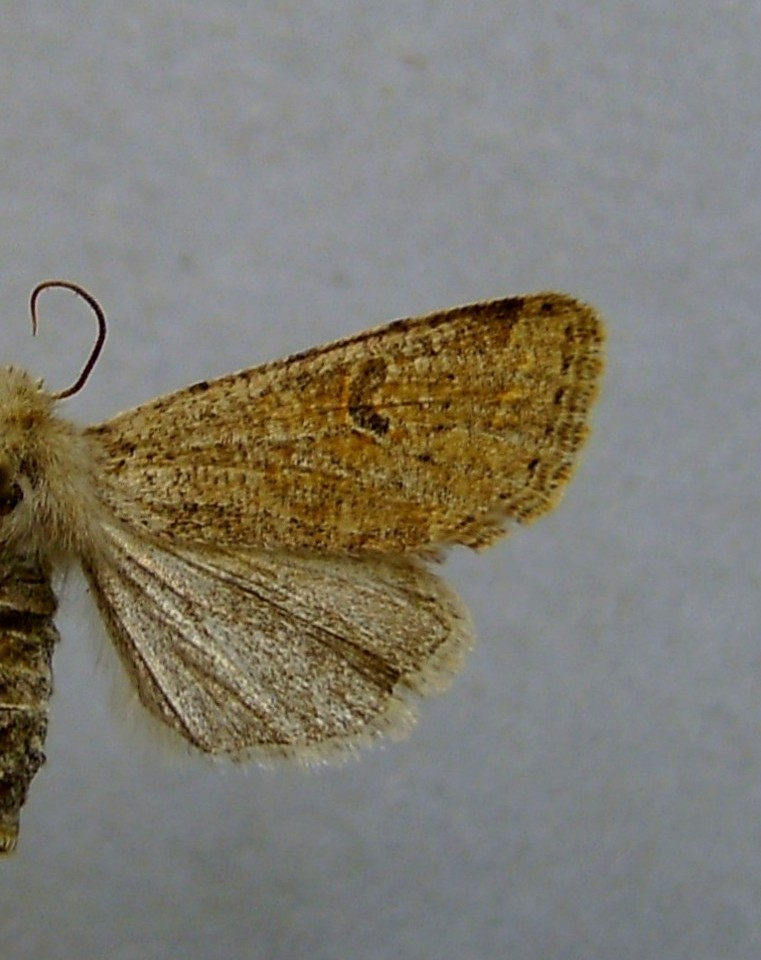
Female

== Technical description and variation ==
The wingspan is 28–32 mm. Forewing grey brown, dusted with dark grey and reddish atoms: inner and outer lines marked by black spots on veins; submarginal line pale, indistinct; upper stigmata dark grey edged with pale and then with rufous; hindwing dull grey. Like Orthosia stabilis, which it resembles in colouration, it varies according to the amount of red shown; — thus pallida Tutt is a very pale grey form without red, but sometimes slightly ochreous-tinged; — pusillus Haw.is a darker grey form without red admixture; — nanus Haw. is like the typical form, reddish grey, but paler; — rufa Tutt is a rarer, reddish form; — lastly, ambigua Hbn. represents a dark red-brown or grey-brown insect with the lines and markings well shown.

== Biology ==
The moth flies in one generation from the end of February to mid-May.

Larva yellowish green, sometimes brown; dorsal and subdorsal lines fine, yellowish white;spiracular line broader and yellower; anal segment with a yellow cross bar; spiracles white with black rings. The larvae feed on various deciduous trees, such as oak and willow. It lives between leaves spun together.

== Notes ==
1. The flight season refers to Belgium and the Netherlands. This may vary in other parts of the range.
