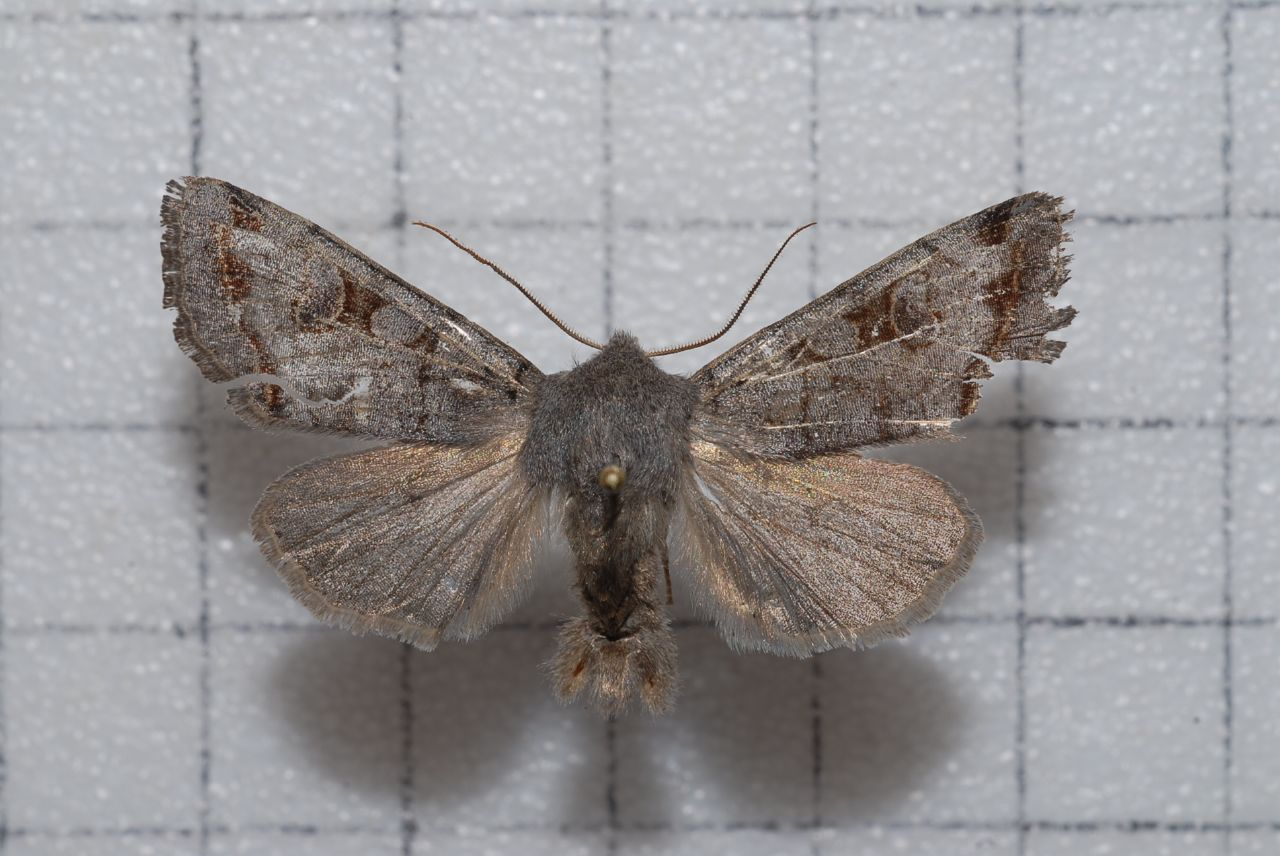

Scientific classification
- Kingdom: Animalia
- Phylum: Arthropoda
- Clade: Pancrustacea
- Class: Insecta
- Order: Lepidoptera
- Superfamily: Noctuoidea
- Family: Noctuidae
- Genus: Orthosia
- Species: O. perfusca

Binomial name
- Orthosia perfusca Sugi, 1986

= Orthosia perfusca =

Species of moth

Orthosia perfusca is a moth of the family Noctuidae. It is found in Taiwan.
