= Orthosia cypriaca =

Scientific classification
- Kingdom: Animalia
- Phylum: Arthropoda
- Clade: Pancrustacea
- Class: Insecta
- Order: Lepidoptera
- Superfamily: Noctuoidea
- Family: Noctuidae
- Genus: Orthosia
- Species: O. cypriaca

Binomial name
- Orthosia cypriaca Hacker, 1996

Species of moth

Orthosia cypriaca is a species of moth of the family Noctuidae. It is endemic to the Israel, Lebanon, Jordan and Cyprus.

Adults are on wing from January to March. There is one generation per year.

The larvae probably feed on deciduous trees.
