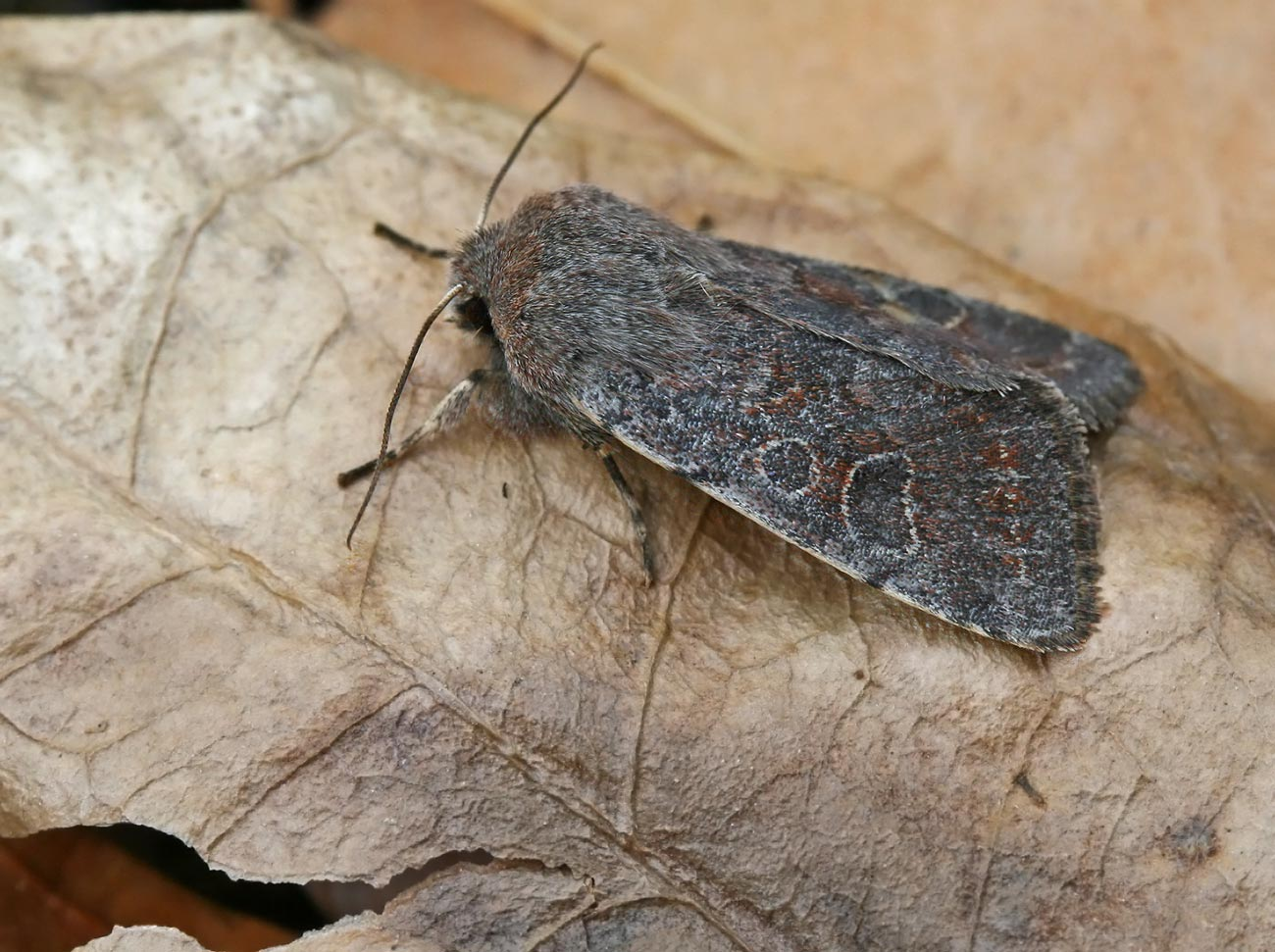

Scientific classification
- Kingdom: Animalia
- Phylum: Arthropoda
- Clade: Pancrustacea
- Class: Insecta
- Order: Lepidoptera
- Superfamily: Noctuoidea
- Family: Noctuidae
- Genus: Orthosia
- Species: O. populeti

Binomial name
- Orthosia populeti (Fabricius, 1775)

= Orthosia populeti =

Lead-coloured drab Orthosia populeti

Species of moth

Orthosia populeti, the lead-coloured drab, is a moth of the family Noctuidae. It is found in Europe.

The wingspan is 34–40 mm. The length of the forewings is 15–17 mm. Meyrick describes it -Antennae in male bipectinated. Forewings brown-grey, slightly purplish-tinged; first, median, and second lines somewhat darker, especially on costa; orbicular and reniform darker, outlined with pale; subterminal line pale greyish-ochreous, edged anteriorly in middle with two small red-brown or black marks. Hindwings grey. Larva pale green or greenish-whitish; dorsal, subdorsal, and spiracular lines whitish; head pale greenish-ochreous, more or less blackmarked. Orthosia populeti is difficult to certainly distinguish from its congener Orthosia incerta See Townsend et al.

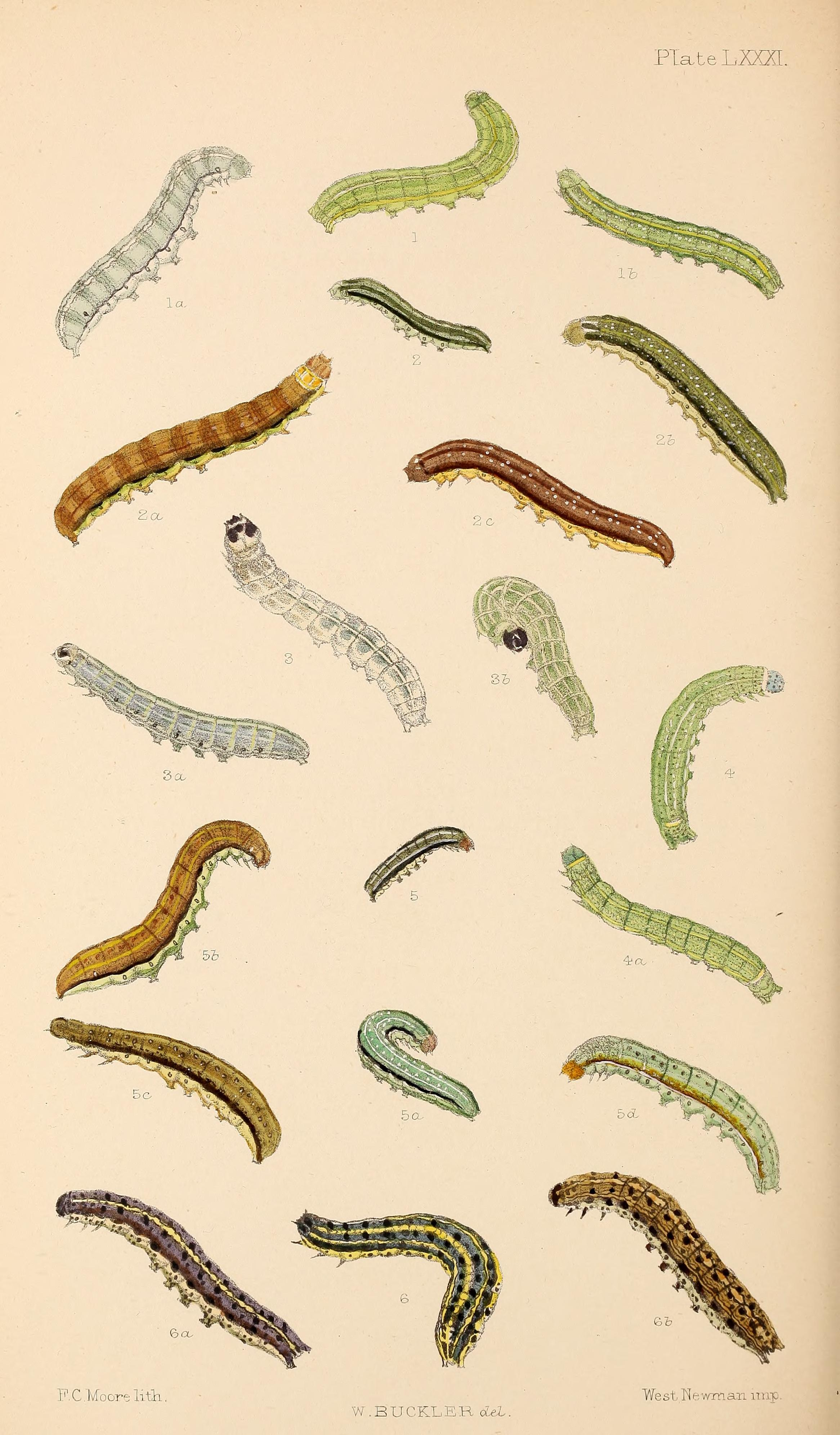
Figs.3, 3a, 3b larva after last moult

The moth flies in one generation from the beginning of March to May. The egg is greyish white with dark grey girdled dots. When full grown the caterpillar is whitish or yellowish green, but always whitish on the back: three white lines on the back, the central one rather broad; head ochreous brown with a blackish spot on each side. The caterpillars mainly feed on aspen.

== Notes ==
1. The flight season refers to Belgium and the Netherlands. This may vary in other parts of the range.
