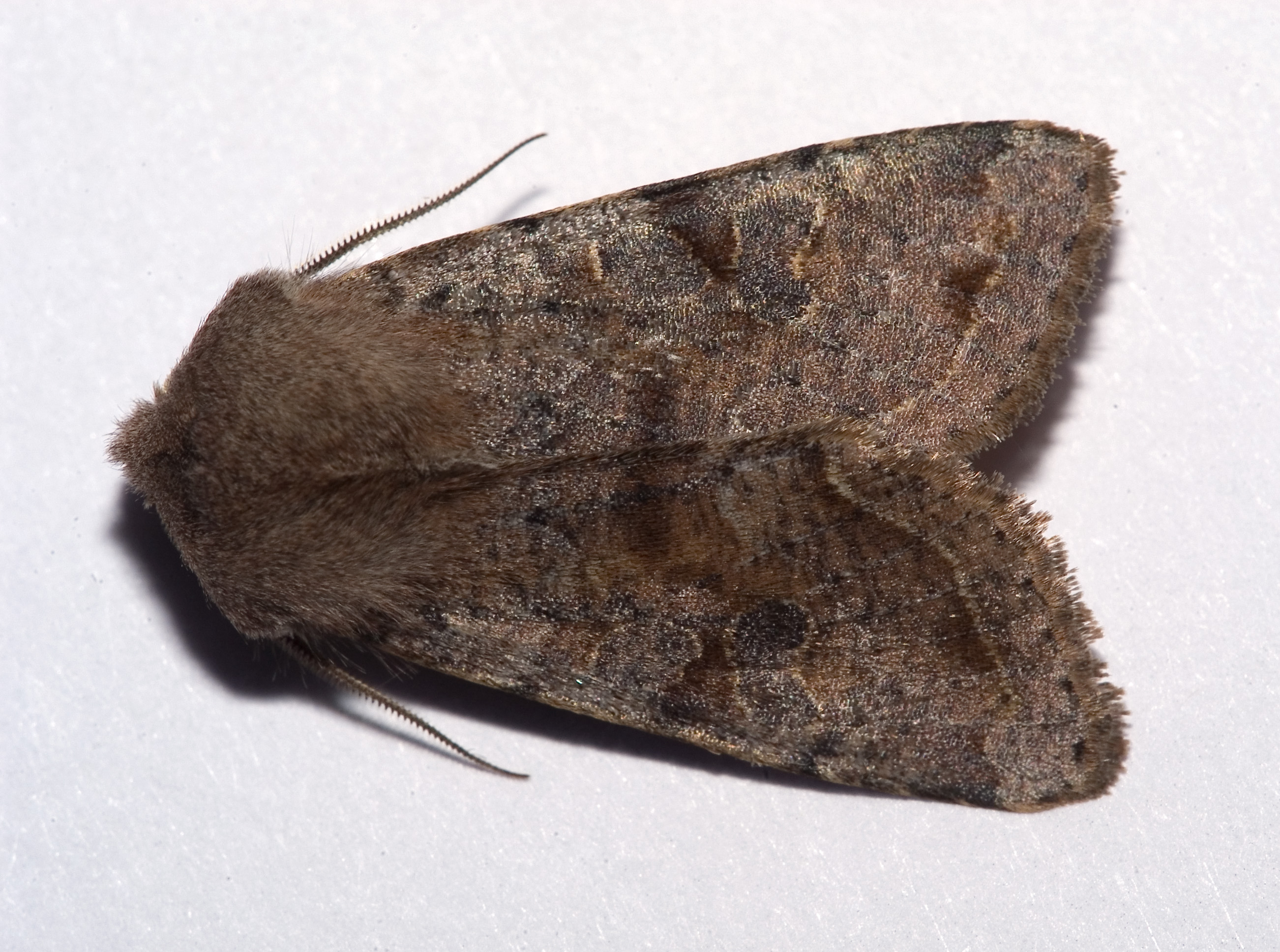
- Orthosia incerta

Scientific classification
- Kingdom: Animalia
- Phylum: Arthropoda
- Clade: Pancrustacea
- Class: Insecta
- Order: Lepidoptera
- Superfamily: Noctuoidea
- Family: Noctuidae
- Tribe: Orthosiini
- Genus: Orthosia; Ochsenheimer, 1816

= Orthosia =

Genus of moths

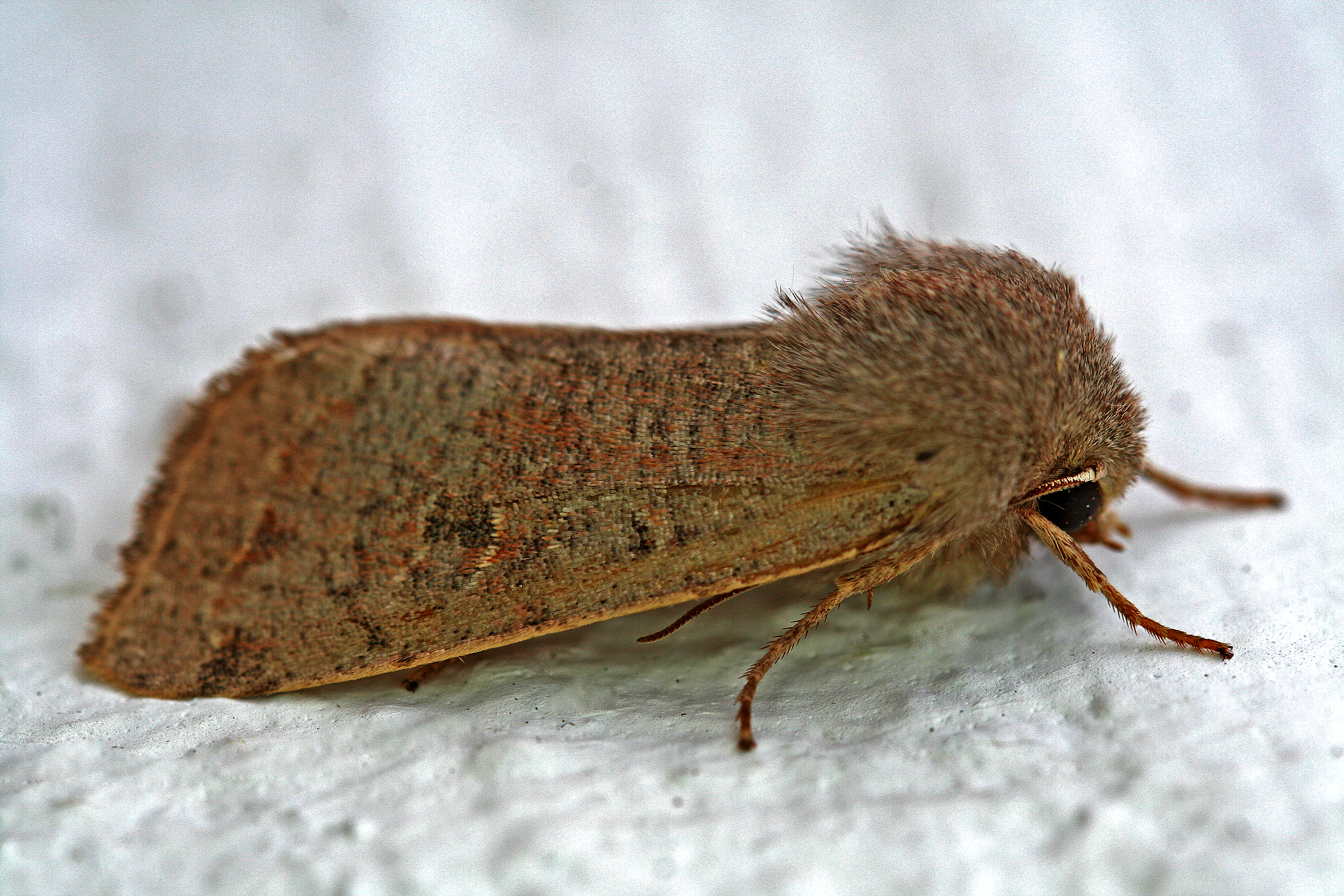
Orthosia sp. moth lateral view

Orthosia is a genus of moths of the family Noctuidae erected by Ferdinand Ochsenheimer in 1816. As with the genus Egira, moths in this genus are sometimes called early spring millers, as adults are on wing in winter and early spring. Species of note are the Hebrew character, the common Quaker, and the speckled green fruitworm moth.

== Species ==
Species in Orthosia include:

- Orthosia achsha
- Orthosia acutangula
- Orthosia addenda
- Orthosia agravens
- Orthosia albescens
- Orthosia albiceps Hampson, 1894
- Orthosia albomarginata
- Orthosia algula
- Orthosia alia
- Orthosia alishana Sugi, 1986
- Orthosia alurina Smith, 1902
- Orthosia ambigua
- Orthosia angustipennis
- Orthosia angustus
- Orthosia annulimacula Smith, 1891
- Orthosia aoyamensis Matsumura, 1926
- Orthosia apicata
- Orthosia arthrolita Harvey, 1875
- Orthosia askoldensis Staudinger, 1892
- Orthosia atra
- Orthosia atriluna Ronkay & Ronkay, 2000
- Orthosia aurifera
- Orthosia bastula
- Orthosia behrensiana Grote, 1875 (syn: Orthosia macona Smith, 1908)
- Orthosia benepicta
- Orthosia bicolor
- Orthosia biconifer
- Orthosia bimaculata
- Orthosia bimaculatus
- Orthosia boursini Rungs, 1972
- Orthosia brevipennis
- Orthosia brucei
- Orthosia brunnea
- Orthosia caerulescens
- Orthosia caliginosa
- Orthosia caloramica
- Orthosia cana
- Orthosia carnipennis Butler, 1878
- Orthosia castanea Sugi, 1986
- Orthosia cedermarki Bryk, 1949
- Orthosia centrifasciata
- Orthosia cerasi Fabricius, 1775 - common Quaker
  - Syn. Orthosia stabilis
- Orthosia cerasus
- Orthosia circumscripta
- Orthosia circumsignata
- Orthosia clausa
- Orthosia collinita
- Orthosia columbaris
- Orthosia conflua
- Orthosia confluens
- Orthosia coniortota Filipjev, 1927
- Orthosia conjuncta
- Orthosia conspecta Wileman, 1914
- Orthosia constabilis
- Orthosia contacta
- Orthosia costijuncta
- Orthosia cruda Denis & Schiffermüller, 1775 - small Quaker
- Orthosia cypriaca Hacker, [1997]
- Orthosia dalmatica Wagner, 1909
- Orthosia dentatelineata
- Orthosia diffusa
- Orthosia discomaculata
- Orthosia disticha Grote, 1875
- Orthosia donasa
- Orthosia dukinfieldi
- Orthosia ella Butler, 1878
- Orthosia elongata
- Orthosia erythrolita Grote, 1879
- Orthosia erythrolitoides
- Orthosia estrigata
- Orthosia evanida Butler, 1879
- Orthosia expuncta
- Orthosia extincta
- Orthosia faqiri Hreblay & Plante, 1994
- Orthosia fasciata
- Orthosia fausta Leech, 1889
- Orthosia feda Hreblay & Plante, 1994
- Orthosia ferrigera Smith, 1894
- Orthosia ferrirena
- Orthosia flavescens
- Orthosia flaviannula Smith, 1899
- Orthosia flavilinea
- Orthosia flavirena Moore, 1881
- Orthosia flavolinea
- Orthosia fluvilinea
- Orthosia franzhoferi
- Orthosia fringata
- Orthosia fuscata
- Orthosia fuscatus
- Orthosia fuscus
- Orthosia garmani Grote, 1879
- Orthosia gemina
- Orthosia geminatus
- Orthosia gothica Linnaeus, 1758 - Hebrew character
- Orthosia gothicina
- Orthosia gracilis [Schiffermüller], 1775 - powdered Quaker
- Orthosia grisea
- Orthosia griseor
- Orthosia griseovariegata
- Orthosia grisescens Hreblay & Ronkay, 1998
- Orthosia habeleri
- Orthosia hamata
- Orthosia hamifera
- Orthosia harutai Yoshimoto, 1993
- Orthosia heckendorni
- Orthosia hepatica
- Orthosia hibisci Guenée, 1852
- Orthosia himalaya
- Orthosia hirsuta
- Orthosia huberti Hreblay & Ronkay, 1999
- Orthosia ijimai Sugi, 1955
- Orthosia imitabilis Hreblay, 1993
- Orthosia immaculata
- Orthosia incerta Hufnagel, 1766 - clouded drab
- Orthosia incognita
- Orthosia inflava
- Orthosia infrapicta
- Orthosia inherita
- Orthosia insciens
- Orthosia instabilis
- Orthosia intermedia
- Orthosia japonica
- Orthosia jezoensis
- Orthosia juncta
- Orthosia junctoides
- Orthosia junctus
- Orthosia kammeli
- Orthosia kenderesiensis
- Orthosia kurosawai Sugi, 1986
- Orthosia latirena
- Orthosia lepida
- Orthosia ligata
- Orthosia limbata Butler, 1879
- Orthosia lizetta Butler, 1878
- Orthosia lota
- Orthosia lushana Sugi, 1986
- Orthosia macilenta Hreblay & Ronkay, 1998
- Orthosia malickyi Hacker, 1993
- Orthosia malora
- Orthosia manfredi Hreblay, 1994
- Orthosia marginata
- Orthosia marmorata
- Orthosia mediofusca Hreblay & Ronkay, 1999
- Orthosia mediolugens
- Orthosia mediomacula Barnes & Benjamin, 1924
- Orthosia melaleuca
- Orthosia miniosa Denis & Schiffermüller, 1775 - blossom underwing
- Orthosia mirabilis
- Orthosia moderata
- Orthosia monimalis
- Orthosia mulina
- Orthosia mundincerta
- Orthosia mundoides
- Orthosia mys Dyar, 1903
- Orthosia nanus
- Orthosia nebulosus
- Orthosia nepalensis Yoshimoto, 1993
- Orthosia nictitans
- Orthosia nigra
- Orthosia nigralba
- Orthosia nigrilinea
- Orthosia nigrolinea
- Orthosia nigromaculata Höne, 1917
- Orthosia nigropunctata
- Orthosia nigrorenalis Hampson, 1894
- Orthosia nongenerica Barnes & Benjamin, 1924
- Orthosia nubilata
- Orthosia nunatrum
- Orthosia obliqua
- Orthosia obscura
- Orthosia obscurior
- Orthosia obsolescens
- Orthosia obsoleta
- Orthosia ocularis
- Orthosia odiosa Butler, 1878
- Orthosia olescens
- Orthosia olivacea
- Orthosia opima Hübner, [1809]
- Orthosia orbiculata
- Orthosia pacifica Harvey, 1874
- Orthosia pallescens
- Orthosia pallida
- Orthosia pallidior
- Orthosia palomarensis
- Orthosia paromoea Hampson, 1905
- Orthosia peregovitsi Hreblay & Ronkay, 1999
- Orthosia perfusca Sugi, 1986
- Orthosia pfennigschmidti
- Orthosia picata Bang-Haas, 1912
- Orthosia plumbea
- Orthosia pluriguttata
- Orthosia poecila Draudt, 1950
- Orthosia populeti Fabricius, 1775 - lead-coloured drab
- Orthosia populi
- Orthosia porosa
- Orthosia postalbida
- Orthosia praeses Grote, 1879
- Orthosia proba
- Orthosia protensa
- Orthosia pseudogothicina
- Orthosia pulchella Harvey, 1876
- Orthosia pulverulenta
- Orthosia punctula
- Orthosia punticostata
- Orthosia pusillus
- Orthosia quinquefasciata
- Orthosia reducta
- Orthosia renilinea
- Orthosia reshoefti Hreblay & Plante, 1994
- Orthosia reticulata Yoshimoto, 1994
- Orthosia revicta Morrison, 1876
- Orthosia rifana
- Orthosia rorida
- Orthosia rosea
- Orthosia roseasparsus
- Orthosia rubescens Walker, 1865
- Orthosia rubricosa
- Orthosia rufa
- Orthosia rufannulata
- Orthosia rufannulatus
- Orthosia rufescens
- Orthosia rufofusca
- Orthosia rufogrisea
- Orthosia rufomaculata
- Orthosia saleppa
- Orthosia satoi Sugi, 1960
- Orthosia schmidtii
- Orthosia semiconfluens
- Orthosia semigothica
- Orthosia segregata Smith, 1891
- Orthosia sieversi
- Orthosia signata
- Orthosia sinelinea
- Orthosia singularis Hreblay & Ronkay, 1998
- Orthosia songi
- Orthosia sordescens Hreblay, 1993
- Orthosia sparsus
- Orthosia stigmata
- Orthosia striata
- Orthosia strigatteria
- Orthosia subcarnea
- Orthosia subcarnipennis Haruta, 1992
- Orthosia subplumbeus
- Orthosia subsetaceus
- Orthosia substriata
- Orthosia subterminata
- Orthosia suffusa
- Orthosia taeniata
- Orthosia tangens
- Orthosia tenuimacula Barnes & McDunnough, 1913
- Orthosia terminata Smith, 1888
- Orthosia tihanyensis
- Orthosia totoobsolescens
- Orthosia transparens Grote, 1882
- Orthosia tremuleti
- Orthosia trigutta
- Orthosia unicolor
- Orthosia ussuriana Kononenko, 1988
- Orthosia ussurica
- Orthosia variabilis
- Orthosia variegata
- Orthosia venata
- Orthosia violacea
- Orthosia virgata
- Orthosia virgatagrisea
- Orthosia vittata
- Orthosia yeterufica
- Orthosia yoshizakii Sugi & Ohtsuka, 1984

== Former species ==
- Orthosia johnstoni McDunnough, 1943 is now a synonym of Perigonica pectinata (Smith, [1888])
