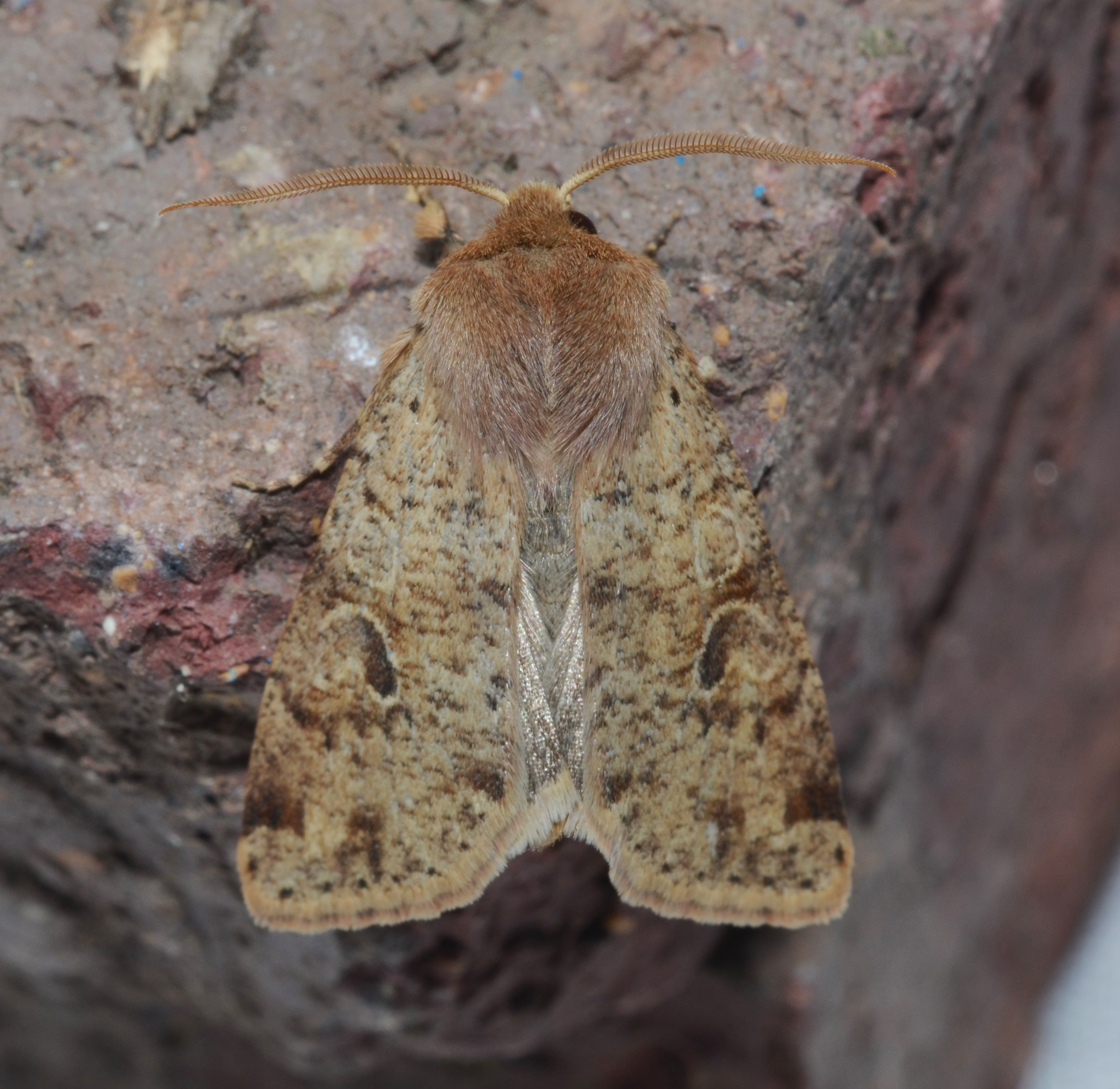

Scientific classification
- Kingdom: Animalia
- Phylum: Arthropoda
- Clade: Pancrustacea
- Class: Insecta
- Order: Lepidoptera
- Superfamily: Noctuoidea
- Family: Noctuidae
- Genus: Orthosia
- Species: O. rubescens

Binomial name
- Orthosia rubescens (Walker, 1865)

= Orthosia rubescens =

Species of moth

Orthosia rubescens, the ruby Quaker, is a species of cutworm or dart moth in the family Noctuidae. It is found in North America.

The MONA or Hodges number for Orthosia rubescens is 10487.
