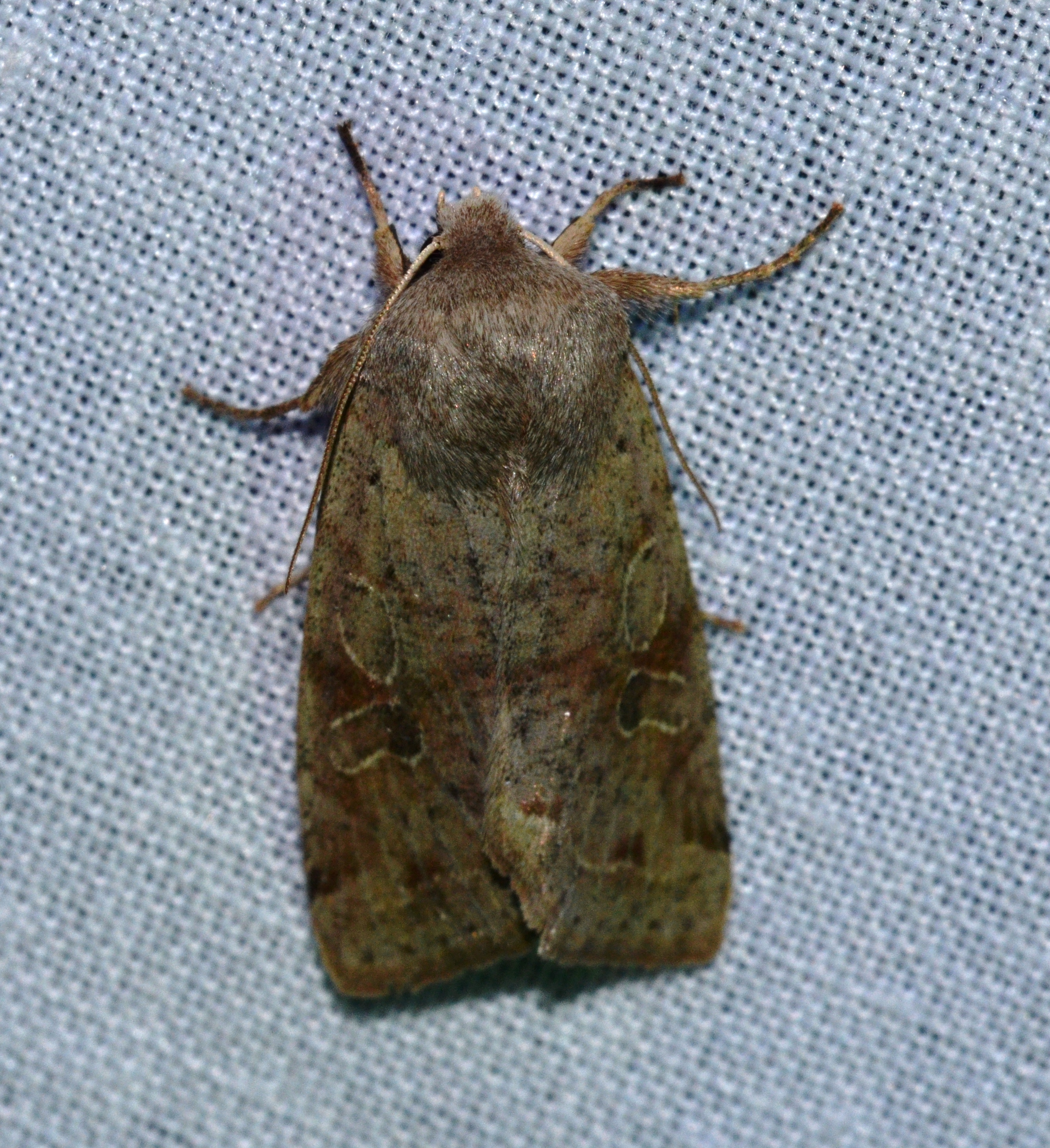
- Adult
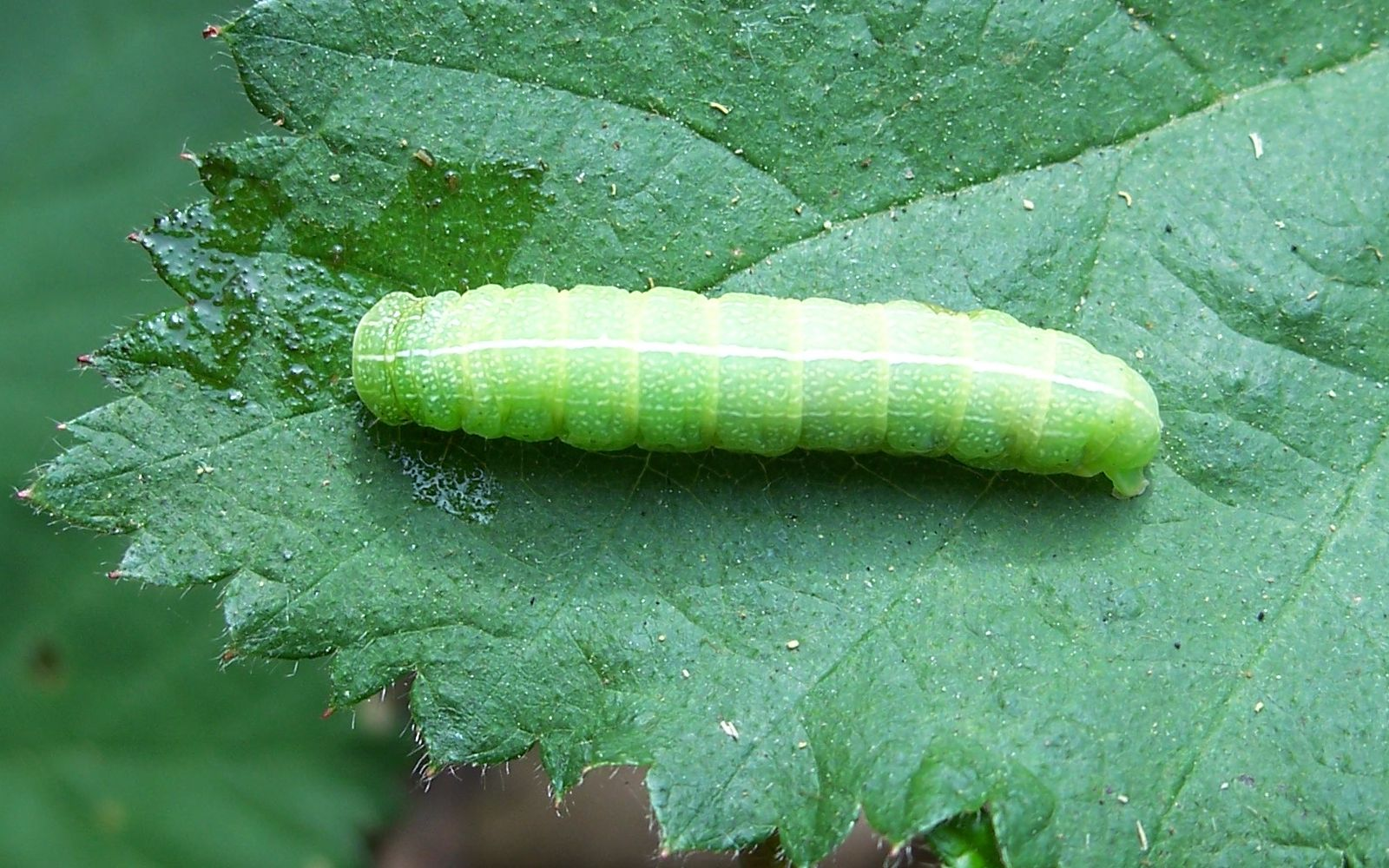
- Larva

Scientific classification
- Kingdom: Animalia
- Phylum: Arthropoda
- Clade: Pancrustacea
- Class: Insecta
- Order: Lepidoptera
- Superfamily: Noctuoidea
- Family: Noctuidae
- Genus: Orthosia
- Species: O. hibisci

Binomial name
- Orthosia hibisci (Guenée, 1852)

Synonyms
- Taeniocampa hibisci Guenée, 1852; Taeniocampa confluens Morrison, 1875; Orthosia insciens Walker, 1857; Taeniocampa brucei Smith, 1910; Taeniocampa malora Smith, 1910; Taeniocampa nubilata Smith, 1910; Taeniocampa quinquefasciata Smith, 1909; Taeniocampa hibisci r. latirena Dod, 1910; Taeniocampa proba Smith, 1910; Taeniocampa inherita Smith, 1910; Taeniocampa inflava Smith, 1910

= Orthosia hibisci =

Species of moth

Orthosia hibisci, the speckled green fruitworm moth, is a moth of the family Noctuidae. It is found in most of North America, except in desert regions. The habitat consists of moist forests, riparian, agricultural and urban areas.

The wingspan is 30–38 mm. The colour ranges from pale buff-grey to dark red-brown. The forewing pattern is also highly variable, from almost non-patterned to strongly banded forms. Adults are on wing from late March to April in one generation per year.

The larvae feed on various hardwood plants, including species in the families Aceraceae, Ericaceae, Betulaceae, Rhamnaceae, Rosaceae, Caprifoliaceae, Fagaceae and Salicaceae.

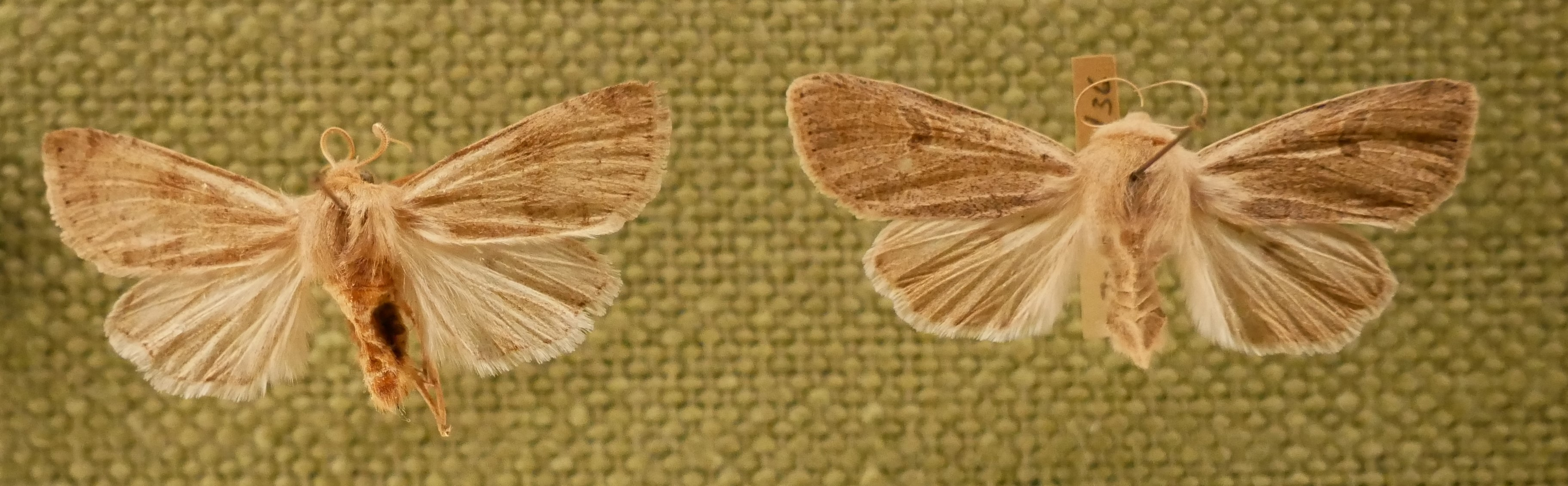
Orthosia hibisci

== Subspecies ==
- Orthosia hibisci hibisci
- Orthosia hibisci brucei (Smith, 1910) (Colorado, Alberta)
- Orthosia hibisci nubilata (Smith, 1910) (Colorado)
- Orthosia hibisci quinquefasciata (Smith, 1909) (British Columbia, Washington, Oregon, California)
