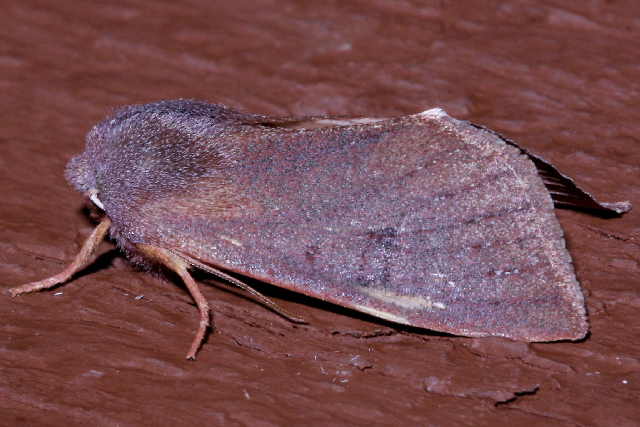

Scientific classification
- Kingdom: Animalia
- Phylum: Arthropoda
- Clade: Pancrustacea
- Class: Insecta
- Order: Lepidoptera
- Superfamily: Noctuoidea
- Family: Noctuidae
- Genus: Orthosia
- Species: O. mys

Binomial name
- Orthosia mys (Dyar, 1903)

= Orthosia mys =

Species of moth

Orthosia mys is a species of cutworm or dart moth in the family Noctuidae. It is found in North America.

The MONA or Hodges number for Orthosia mys is 10481.
