= Orthosia tenuimacula =

Scientific classification
- Kingdom: Animalia
- Phylum: Arthropoda
- Clade: Pancrustacea
- Class: Insecta
- Order: Lepidoptera
- Superfamily: Noctuoidea
- Family: Noctuidae
- Genus: Orthosia
- Species: O. tenuimacula

Binomial name
- Orthosia tenuimacula (Barnes & McDunnough, 1913)

Species of moth

Orthosia tenuimacula is a species of cutworm or dart moth in the family Noctuidae first described by William Barnes and James Halliday McDunnough in 1913. It is found in North America.

The MONA or Hodges number for Orthosia tenuimacula is 10498.
