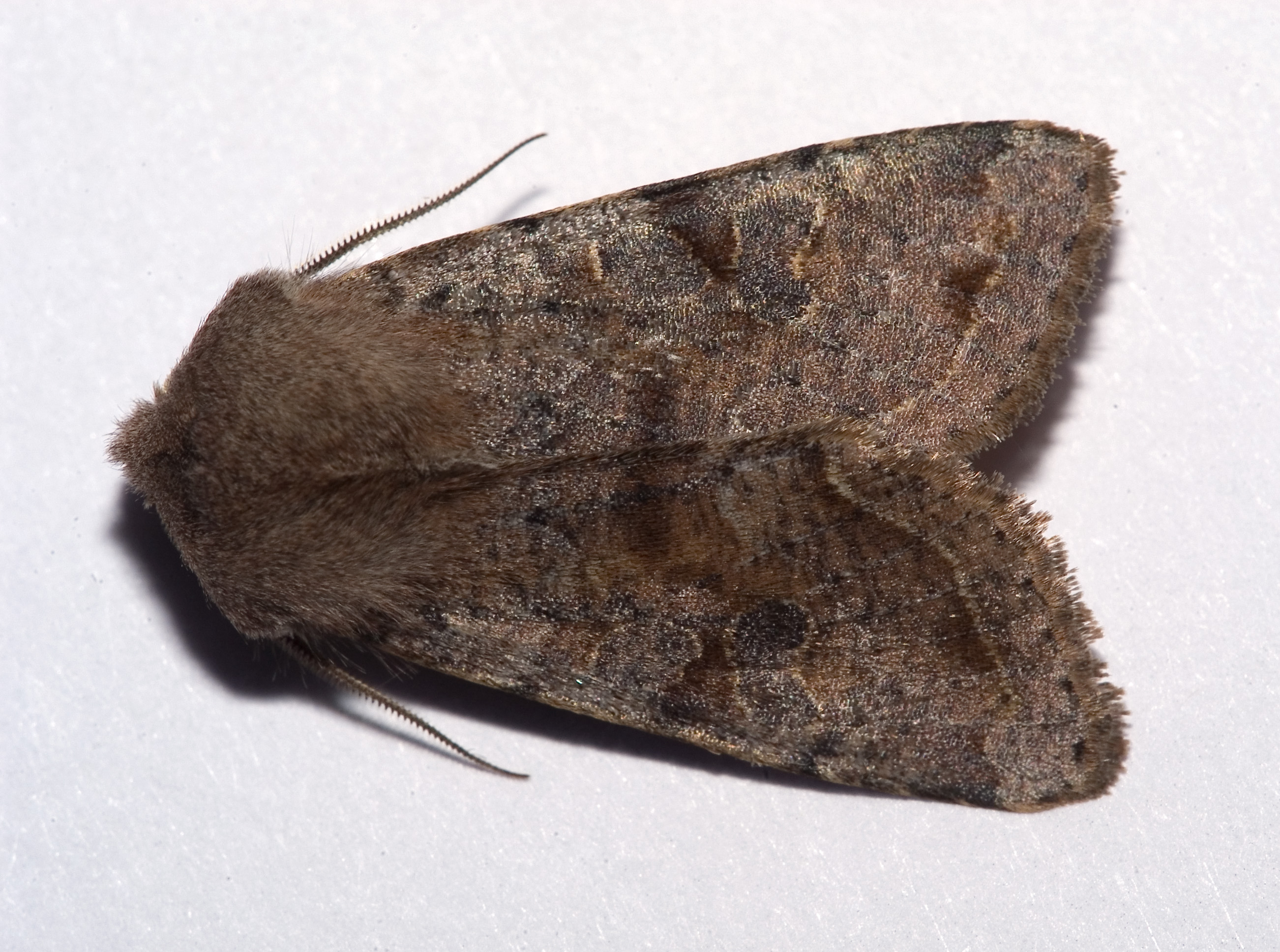

Scientific classification
- Kingdom: Animalia
- Phylum: Arthropoda
- Clade: Pancrustacea
- Class: Insecta
- Order: Lepidoptera
- Superfamily: Noctuoidea
- Family: Noctuidae
- Genus: Orthosia
- Species: O. incerta

Binomial name
- Orthosia incerta (Hufnagel, 1766)

= Orthosia incerta =

Clouded drab

Species of moth

Orthosia incerta, the clouded drab, is a species of moth of the family Noctuidae, found in Europe and Asia. The occurrence of the species extends through all European countries through the Palearctic to the Russian Far East and Japan. It is absent from northern Fennoscandia and in the Alps it occurs up to 2000 m above sea level.

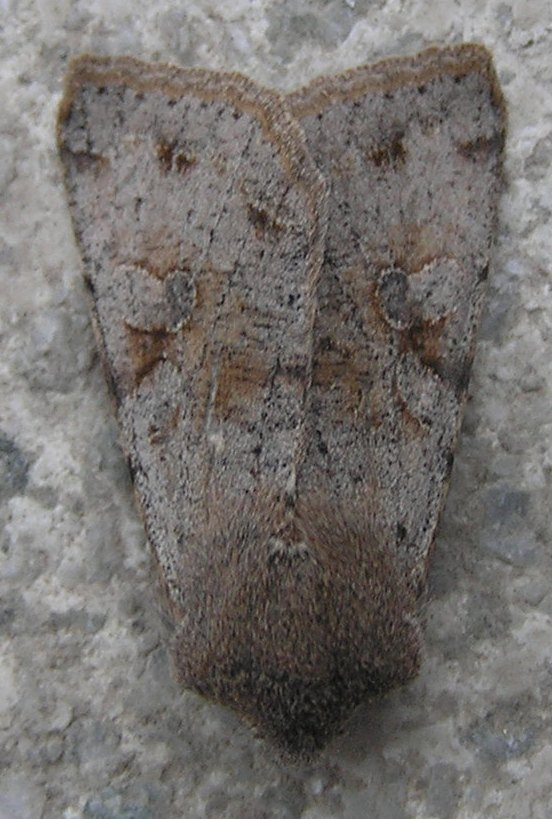
Gray variant

== Technical description and variation ==
Forewing grey, varied with fuscous dusting and striation, and often more or less tinged with rufous; inner and outer lines, where visible, marked by dark dots on veins; submargmal line variable, sometimes obscure, at others pale, and preceded by a dark shade, which may be complete or broken up into three blotches; upper stigmata large, the reniform generally dark, both edged with pale; a strong thick median shade, sometimes bent at middle and entire, often marked only at costa and inner margin; hindwing pale or dark grey with dark cellspot and pale fringe. The markings are all clearer in the grey unsuffused forms: of these the chief are pallida Lampa from Sweden with the ground colour pale grey, finely striated with dark, and the two dotted cross lines;- coerulescens Tutt with the ground colour pale bluish grey; — subsetaceus Haw.which is dark slaty grey without reddish tinge, and subcarnea nov. [Warren] greyish flesh colour and praesubmarginal shades deep brown, the hindwing dull white with submarginal band and cellspot dark: of the darker forms contracta Esp. is suffused with rufous brown, leading up to fuscatus Haw. which is dark purplish liver colour; — angustus Haw. is a rarer form, mottled with chesnutbrown and fuscous; — atra Tutt and rufa Tutt are two equally rare forms, the former unicolorous sooty blackish, the latter bright reddish. These dark suffused forms are commoner in Britain, where the paler and more typical forms are rare. Still another form, apparently undescribed - olivacea nov. [Warren] has the forewing ashy grey with a strong olive flush; the median shade and the clouds before submarginal line also deeper olive; of two males one is much more varied with olive fuscous and with the lines better marked than the other; the female is wholly dark olive fuscous, with the edges of the stigmata and the submarginal line paler; in all 3 the reniform stigma is broader and less oblique than in typical incerta; the hindwing varies from pale to dark grey with an olive tinge, with dark cellspot and whitish fringe. 2 males, 1 female, together with some more or less typical specimens, from Cedre, Hautes Pyrenees. Orthosia incerta is difficult to certainly distinguish from its congener Orthosia populeti (Fabricius, 1781).See Townsend et al.

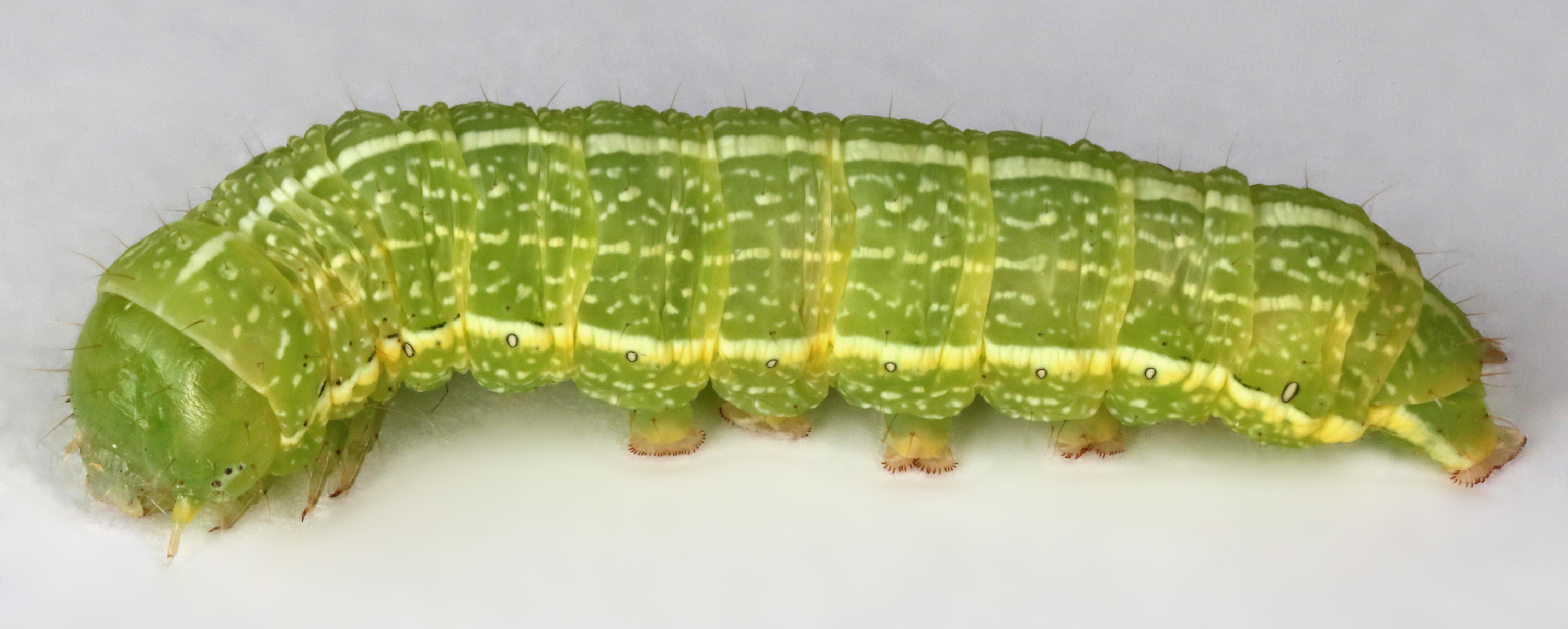
Larva

== Biology ==
The moth flies in one generation from the end of February to mid-May.

Larva green, dotted with yellowish white; dorsal line yellowish; subdorsal less distinct; spiracular line pale yellow, edged above with blackish; spiracles white, ringed with black; on various trees and shrubs. The larvae feed on various trees and shrubs, mainly oak.

== Notes ==
1. The flight season refers to Belgium and the Netherlands. This may vary in other parts of the range.
