= Ripon (disambiguation) =

Ripon is a city in North Yorkshire, England.

Ripon may also refer to:

== Places ==
=== Australia ===
- County of Ripon, Victoria
- Electoral district of Ripon, Victoria
- Shire of Ripon, Victoria, a former local government area

=== Canada ===
- Ripon, Quebec

=== England ===
- Ripon (UK Parliament constituency)
- Liberty of Ripon, a former liberty possessing separate county jurisdiction
- Diocese of Ripon, a former Church of England diocese
- Ripon Canal, North Yorkshire

=== Uganda ===
- Ripon Falls, Uganda

=== United States ===
- Ripon, California
- Ripon, Wisconsin
  - Ripon (town), Wisconsin

== Schools ==
- Ripon College (disambiguation)
- Ripon High School (California), Ripon, California
- Ripon High School (Wisconsin), Ripon, Wisconsin
- Ripon Grammar School, Ripon, North Yorkshire, England

== Military ==
- HMS Rippon, several ships of the Royal Navy
- Blackburn Ripon, a British carrier-based torpedo bomber and reconnaissance biplane which first flew in 1926
- RAF Ripon, also known as Royal Flying Corps Ripon, a First World War airfield

== Transportation ==
- PS Ripon, a 19th-century paddlesteamer
- SS Ripon, a 20th-century merchant ship
- Ripon railway station, Ripon, North Yorkshire, a former station
- Ripon station, a future railway station in Ripon, California

== Other uses ==
- Marquess of Ripon and Earl of Ripon, extinct titles in the Peerage of the United Kingdom
- Baron Ripon, a subsidiary title held only by the second Duke of Queensberry
- Ripon Building, a building in Chennai
- Ripon Cricket Club, Ripon, North Yorkshire
- Ripon Nath, 21st century Bangladeshi movie audio engineer

== See also ==
- Ripon Society, a centrist Republican think tank
- Ecgberht of Ripon (died 729), Anglo-Saxon monk and Bishop of Lindisfarne
- Stephen of Ripon, author of the eighth-century hagiographic text Vita Sancti Wilfrithi (Life of Saint Wilfrid)
- Rippon (disambiguation)
