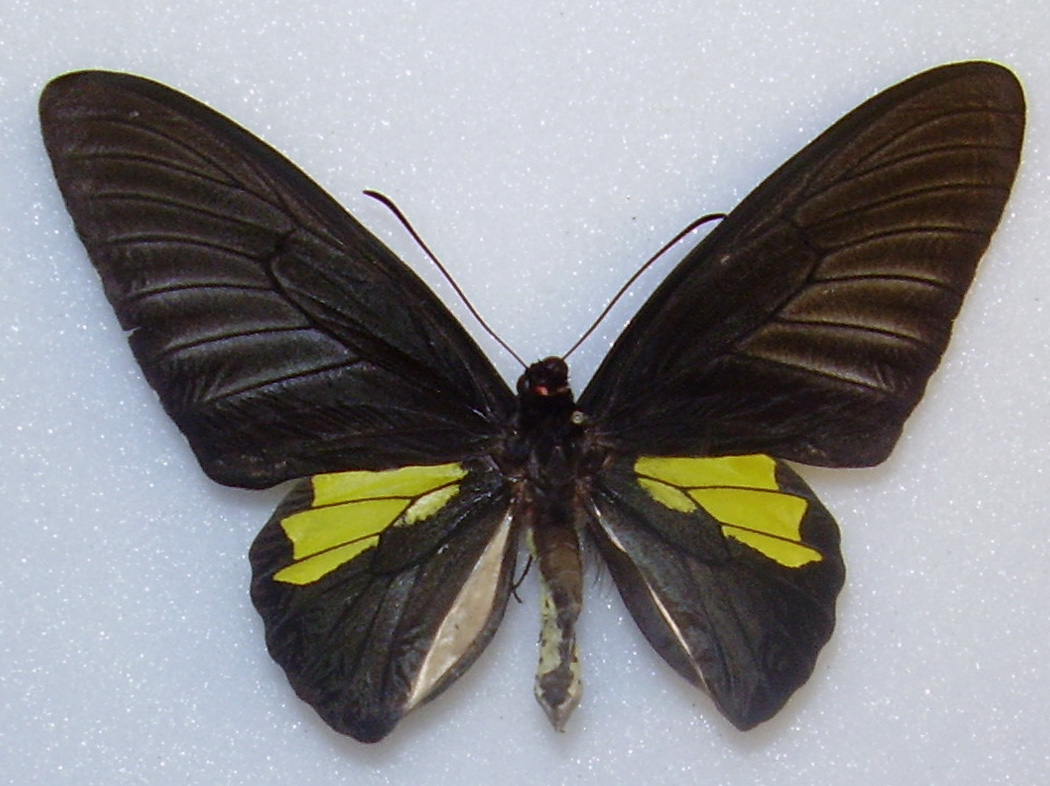
- Male, upperside, Palawan

Conservation status
- CITES Appendix II

Scientific classification
- Kingdom: Animalia
- Phylum: Arthropoda
- Class: Insecta
- Order: Lepidoptera
- Family: Papilionidae
- Genus: Troides
- Species: T. plateni

Binomial name
- Troides plateni Staudinger, 1889

= Troides plateni =

Dr. Platen's birdwing

Species of butterfly

Troides plateni, the Dr. Platen's birdwing, is a birdwing butterfly endemic to Palawan, Balabac, Dumaran, and the Calamian Islands in the Philippines. It is named for Dr. Carl Constantin Platen.

== Habitat and conservation ==
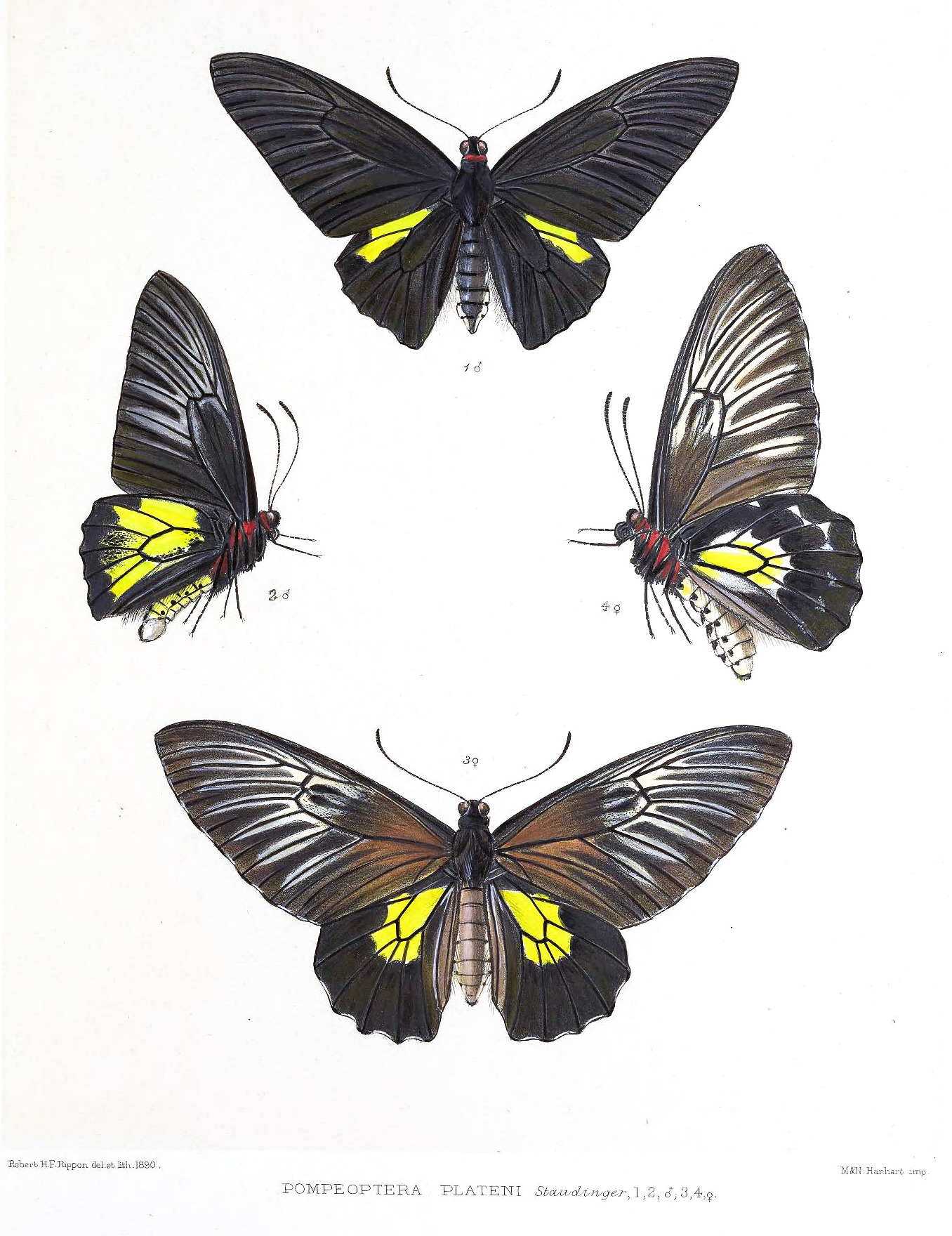
As Pompeoptera Troides plateni in Robert Henry Fernando Rippon Icones Ornithopterorum (1898 to 1906)

Troides plateni is found mainly in wooded habitats. The larval food plant is Aristolochia tagala (Aristolochiaceae). It is protected by the Convention on International Trade in Endangered Species (CITES).

== Taxonomic position ==
The taxonomic relationship between T. rhadamantus rhadamantus, T. rhadamantus plateni and T. dohertyi is uncertain. Haugum & Low (1985) rank plateni and dohertyi as a subspecies of T. rhadamantus (Tsukada & Nishiyama, 1980, 1982). Ohya (1983) rank plateni as a species.
