= Rippon =

Rippon may refer to:

== Locations ==
- Rippon, West Virginia, United States, an unincorporated community
- Rippon station, a railway station in Woodbridge, Virginia, United States
- Rippon Glacier, a glacier in Kemp Land, East Antarctica
- Rippon Tor, a granite tor in Dartmoor, England

== Other uses ==
- Rippon (surname)
- HMS Rippon, various Royal Navy ships
- Rippon College, a girls' school in Galle, Sri Lanka
- Rippon Lodge, oldest house in Prince William County, Virginia, United States

== See also ==
- Ripon
