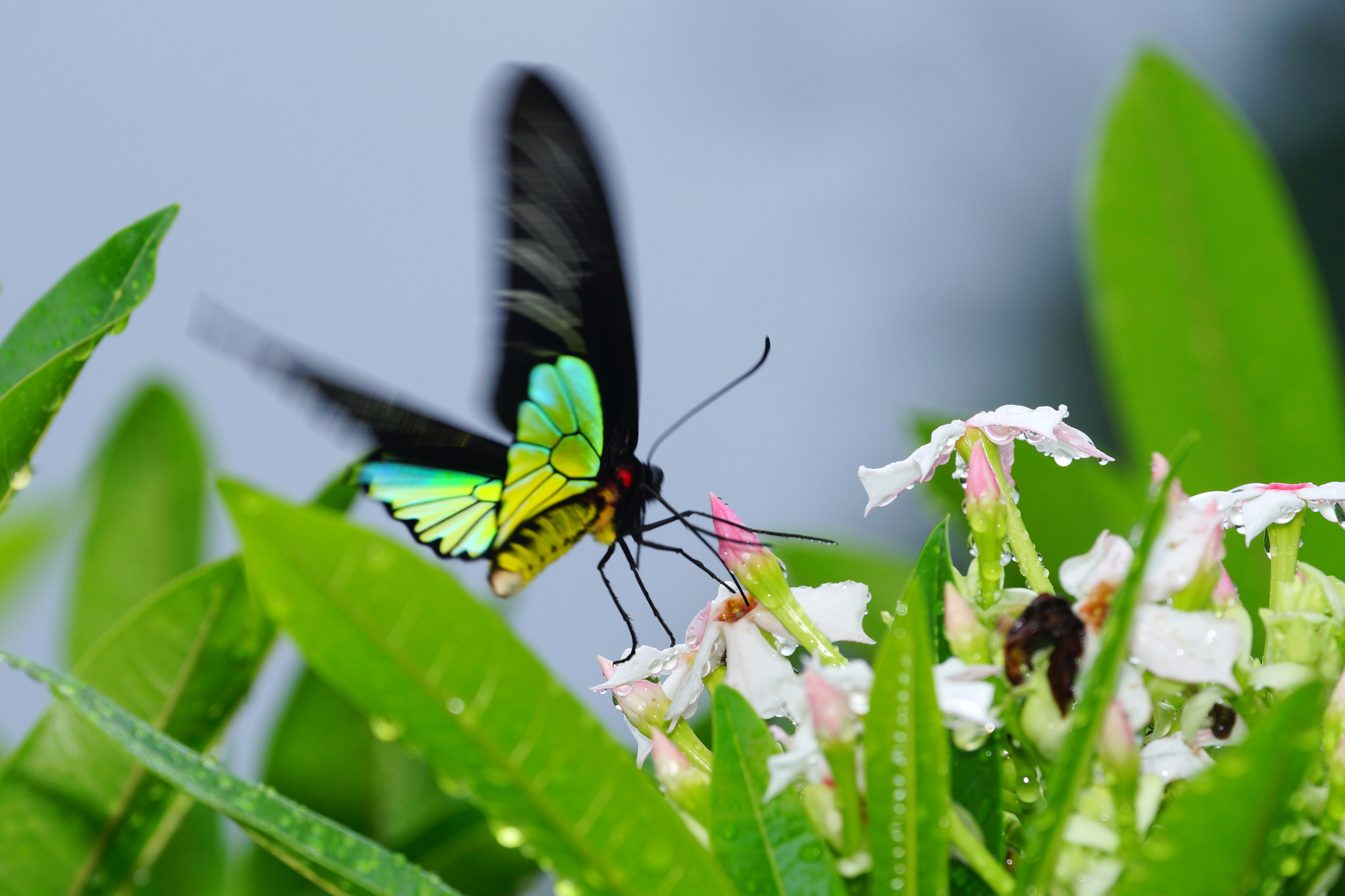
- Male T. m. sonani
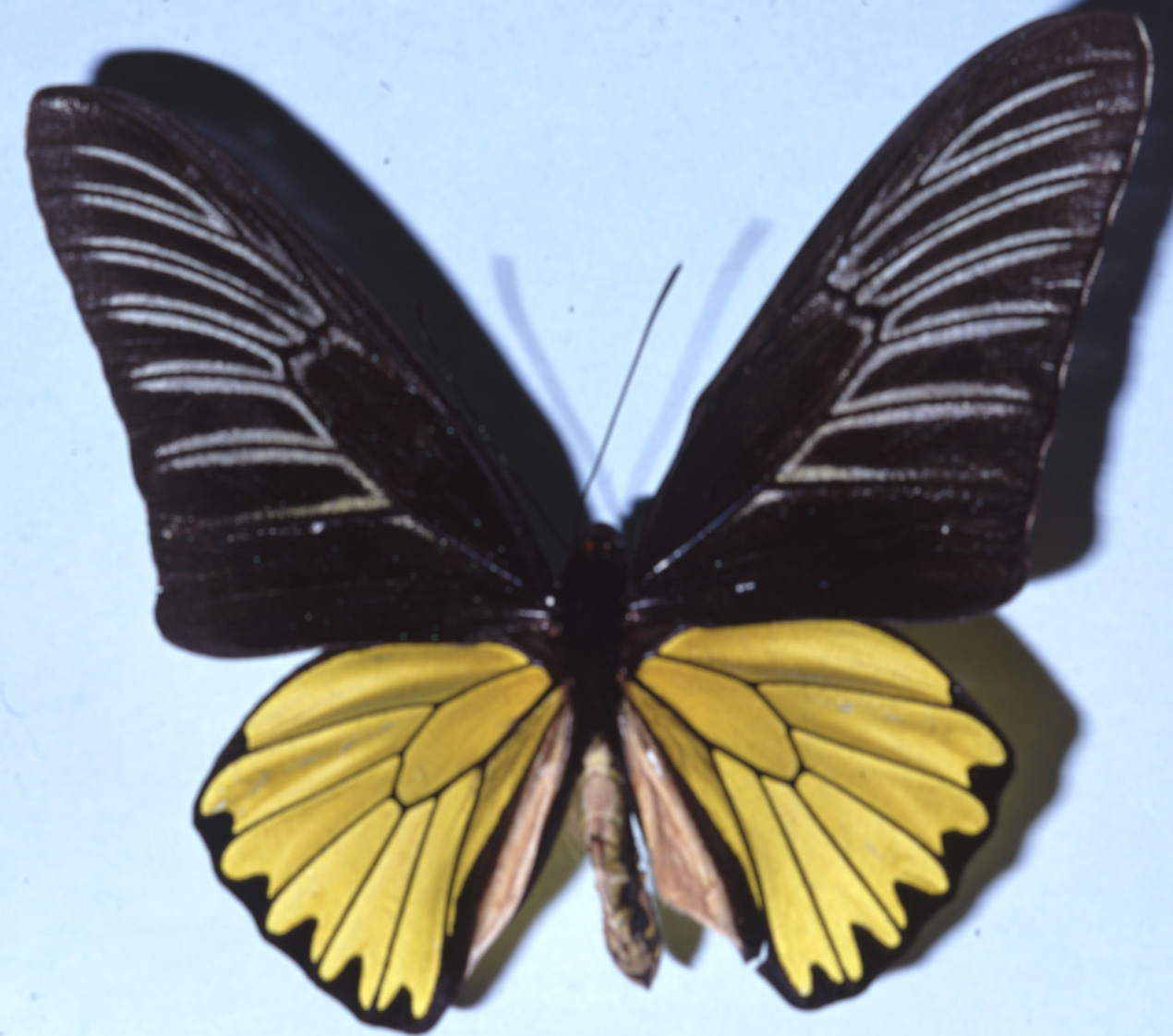
- Dorsal view

Conservation status
- CITES Appendix II

Scientific classification
- Kingdom: Animalia
- Phylum: Arthropoda
- Clade: Pancrustacea
- Class: Insecta
- Order: Lepidoptera
- Family: Papilionidae
- Genus: Troides
- Species: T. magellanus

Binomial name
- Troides magellanus (Felder, 1862)
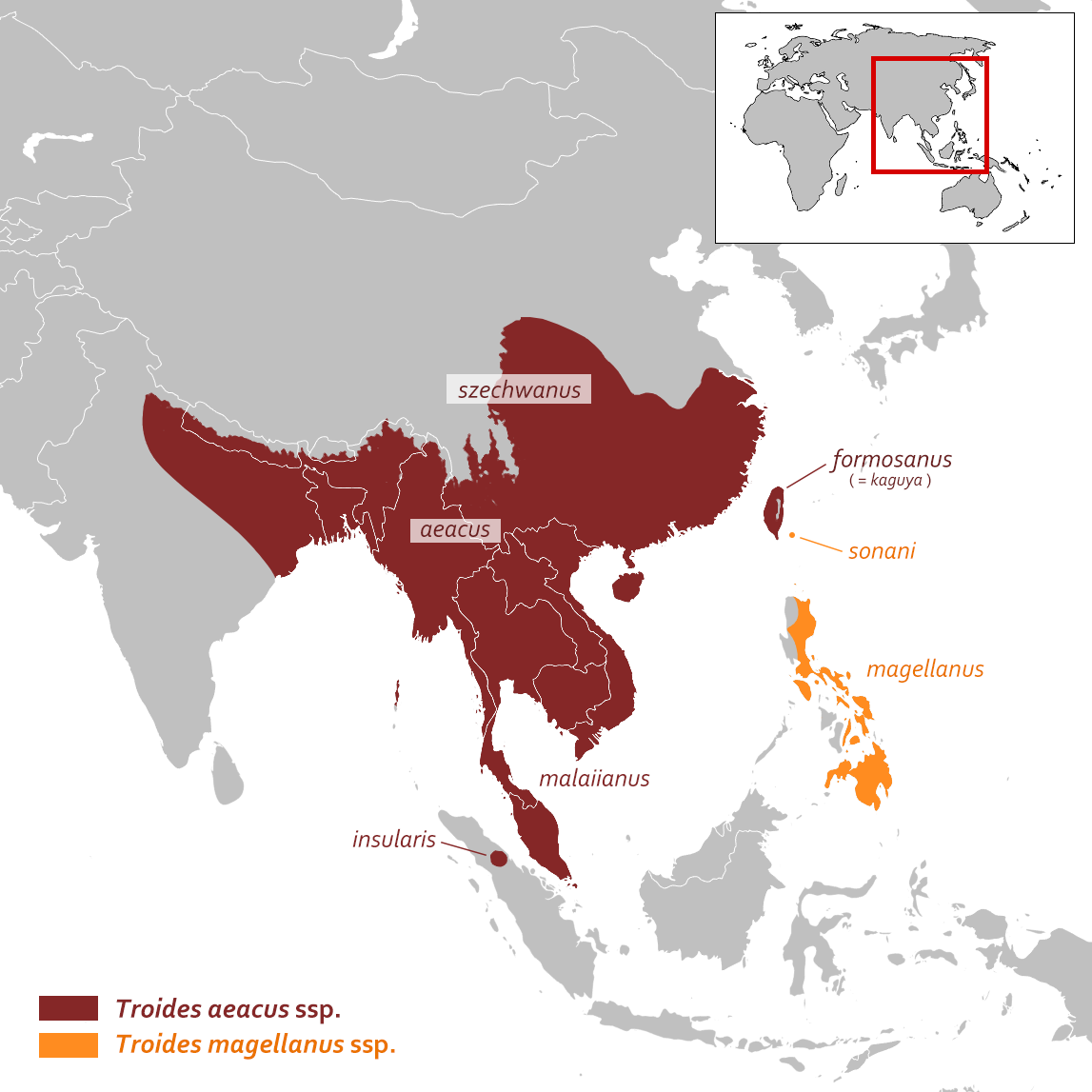
- Distribution map for Troides magellanus (orange) and Troides aeacus (red)

= Troides magellanus =

Magellan birdwing

Species of butterfly

Troides magellanus, the Magellan birdwing, is a large and striking species of birdwing butterfly found in the Philippines and on Taiwan's Orchid Island.

This butterfly is named for the explorer Ferdinand Magellan who was killed in the Philippines in 1521.

== Description ==
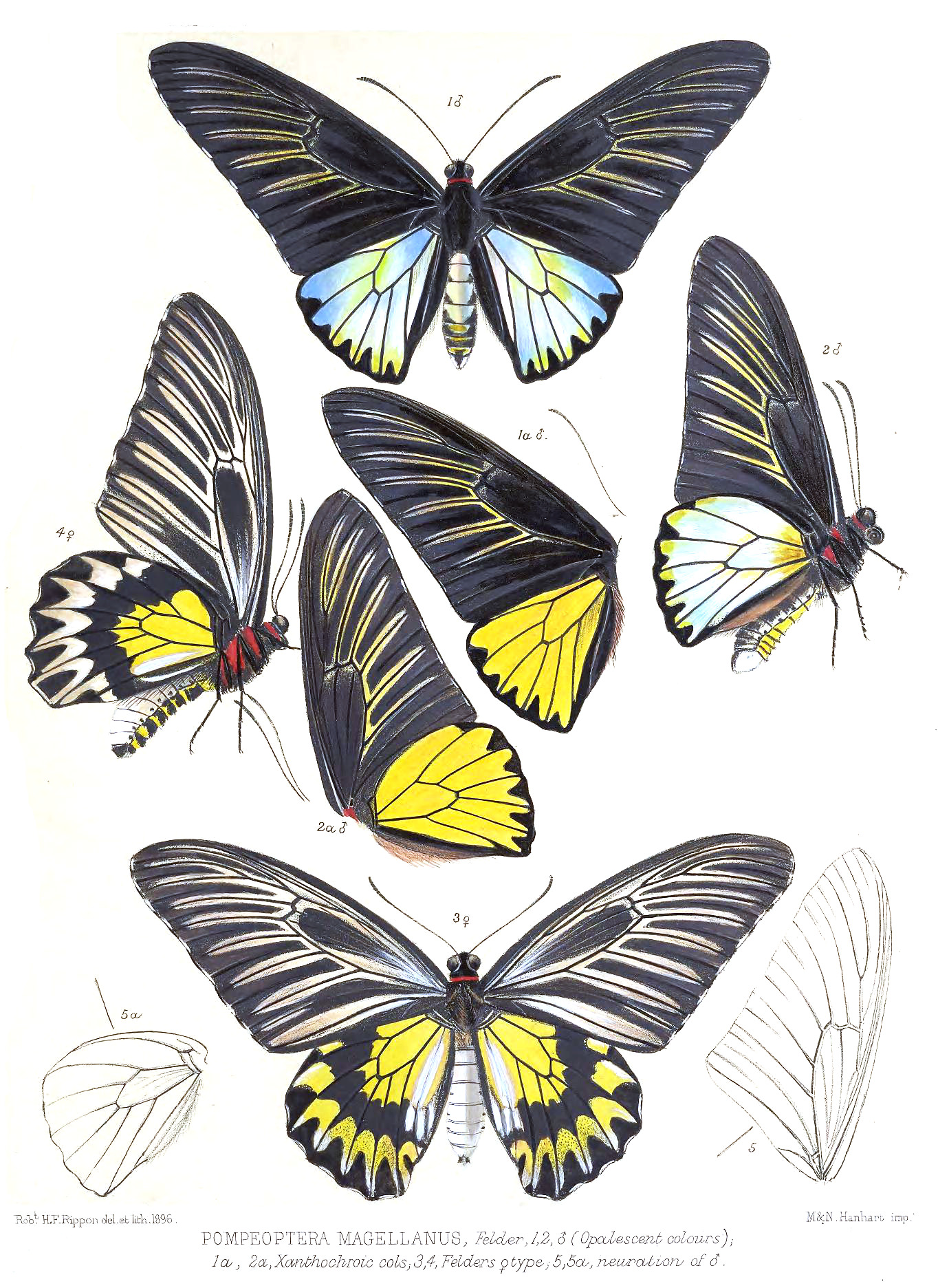
As Pompeoptera Magellanus in Robert Henry Fernando Rippon's Icones Ornithopterorum (1898 to 1906)

Male: The forewings are ground colour black. The veins are bordered by white. The underside of the forewings is very similar to the upperside, but some veins are bordered by yellow. The hindwings are golden yellow. The veins and the marginal edge of the hindwing are black. The golden area has an opal, green or blue colour at a certain angle. The underside of the hindwing is very similar to the upperside and also has the optical effect.

The body (abdomen) is yellowish, but the underside is yellow. Head and thorax are black.

Female: is sexually dimorphic. The female is larger than the male. The ground colour of the female is dark brown to black. The veins are bordered by white colour shading. There is a golden area with dark veins on the hindwings. At the edge there is a postdiscal chain of golden spots. The underside is very similar to the upperside.

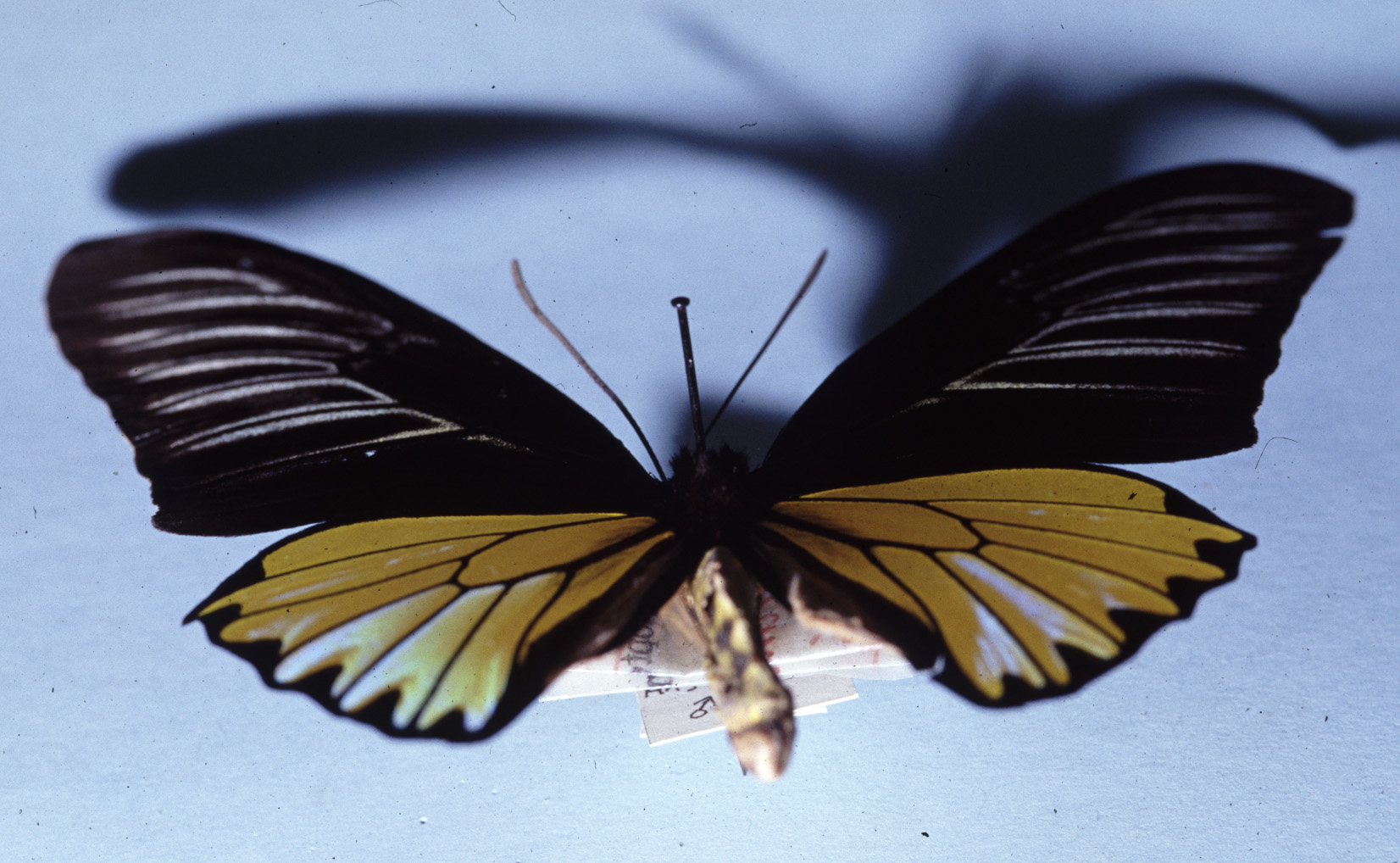
Troides magellanus at the angle at which iridescence appears. Same specimen as in the box above right.

=== Iridescence ===
T. magellanus shows a blue-green sheen if viewed from an oblique angle. Troides magellanus and the much rarer T. prattorum, are noted for their use of limited-view iridescence: the yellow of the dorsal hindwings is modified by bright blue-green iridescence which is only seen when the butterfly is viewed at a narrow, oblique angle. This "grazing iridescence" is brought about through diffraction of light (after back reflection) by the wings' extremely steeply set, multilayered rib-like scales (rather than the ridge-lamellae of most other iridescent butterflies, such as Morpho species). Such limited-view iridescence was previously only known from one other species, the lycaenid Ancyluris meliboeus. In A. meliboeus, however, the iridescence is produced by ridge-lamellar scales and features a wider range of colours.

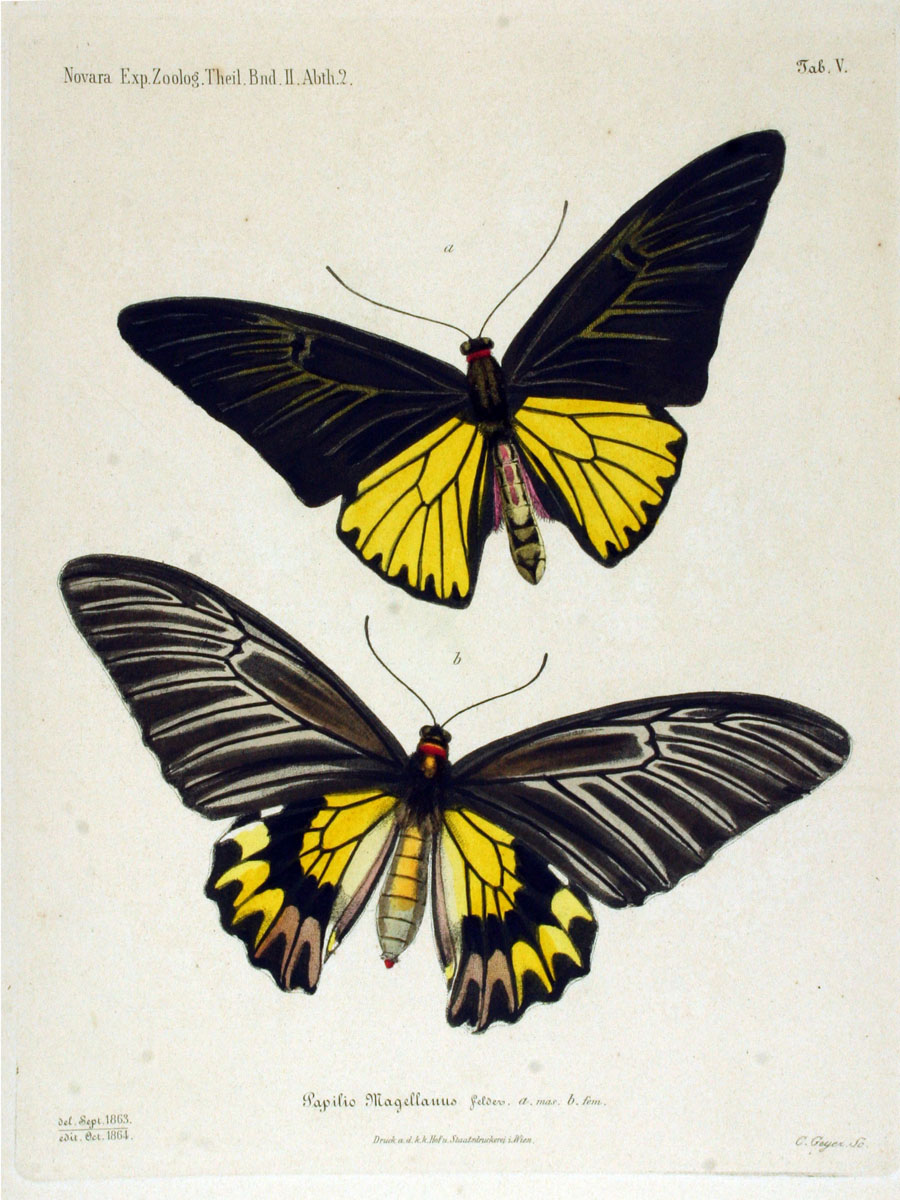
Plate accompanying the original description

== Distribution ==
Philippines Batan Island, Babuyan Island, Luzon, Polillo, Marinduque, Cuyo Island, Samar, Cebu, Leyte, Bohol and Mindanao.

Taiwan Orchid Island only.

== Biology ==
Larvae feed on species of Aristolochia - A. acuminata, A. debilis, A. kankauensis, A. tagala and A. zollingeriana

== Subspecies ==
- Troides magellanus magellanus Philippines
- Troides magellanus sonani (Matsumura, 1931) 65 km south-east of Taïwan on Orchid Island

Forma

- Troides magellanus f. apoensis Okano & Ohkura, 1978
- Troides magellanus f. leyteanus Okano & Ohkura, 1983

== Related species ==
Troides magellanus is a member of the Troides aecus species group. The members of this clade are:

- Troides aeacus C. & R. Felder, 1860
- Troides magellanus (C. & R. Felder, 1862)
- Troides minos (Cramer, [1779])
- Troides rhadamantus (Lucas, 1835)
- Troides dohertyi (Rippon, 1893)
- Troides prattorum (Joicey & Talbot, 1922)

== See also ==
- Ecoregions in the Philippines
