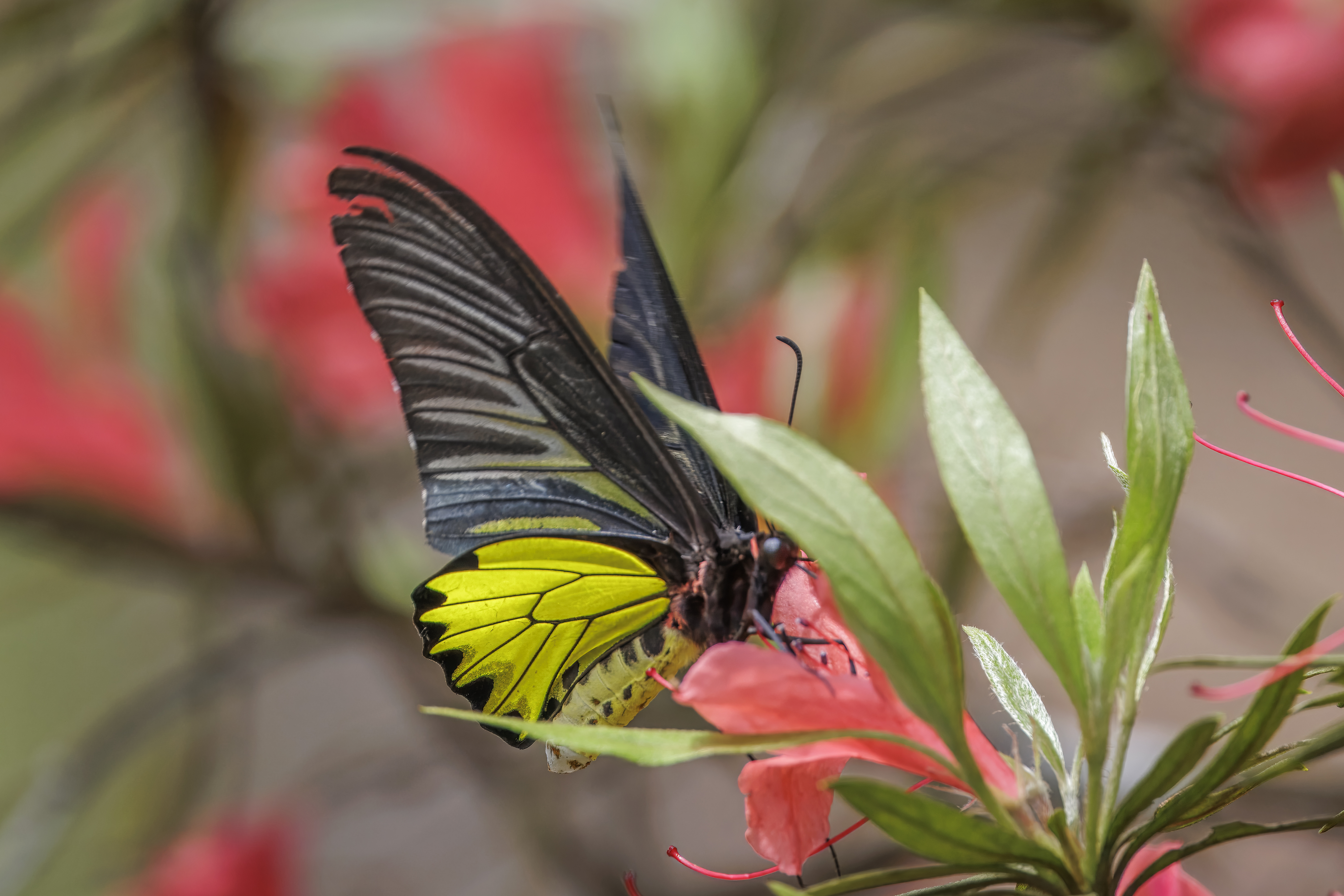
- male T. a. aecus, Vietnam
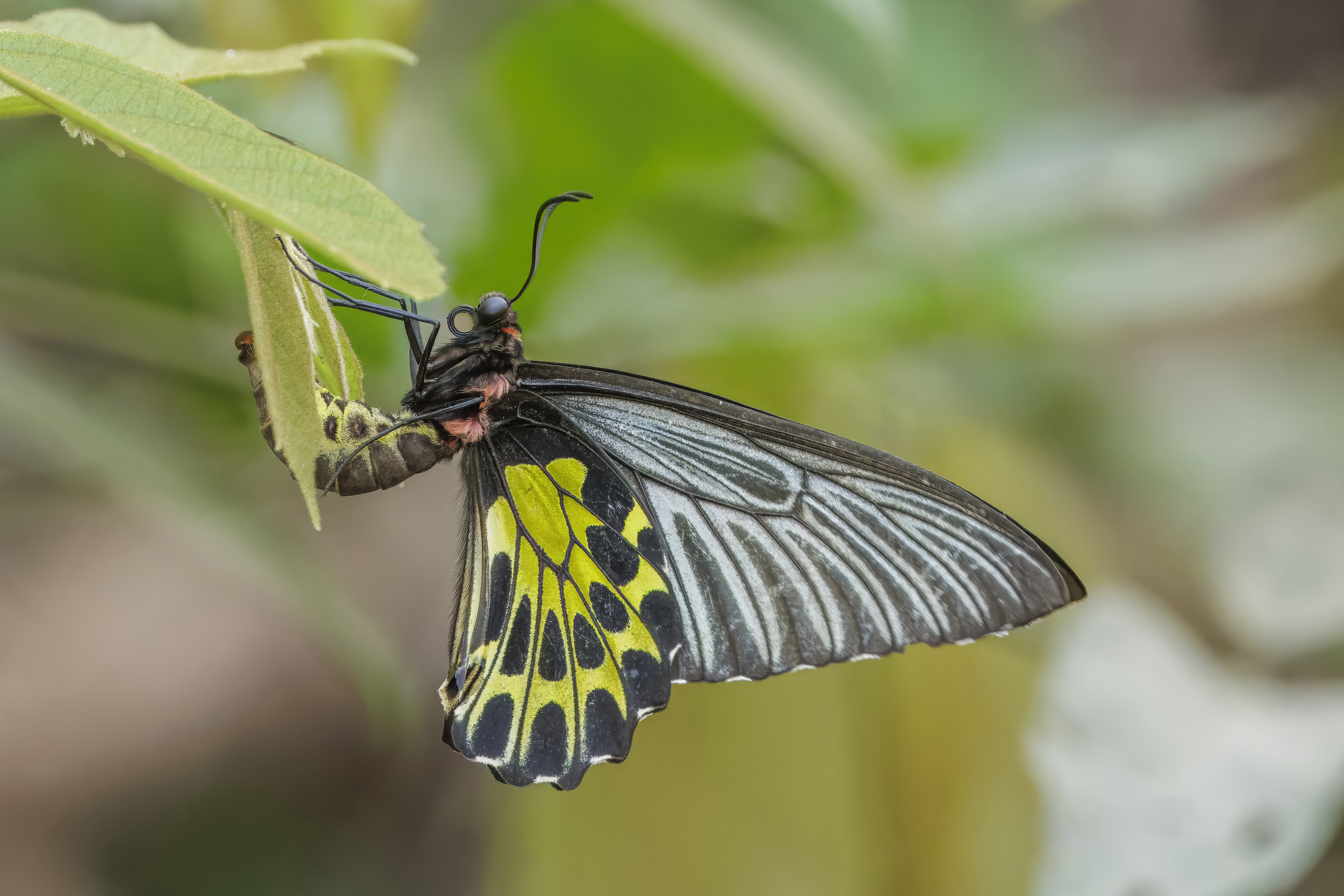
- female T. a. aecus, Cambodia

Conservation status
- Least Concern (IUCN 3.1)
- CITES Appendix II

Scientific classification
- Kingdom: Animalia
- Phylum: Arthropoda
- Clade: Pancrustacea
- Class: Insecta
- Order: Lepidoptera
- Family: Papilionidae
- Genus: Troides
- Species: T. aeacus

Binomial name
- Troides aeacus C. & R. Felder, 1860
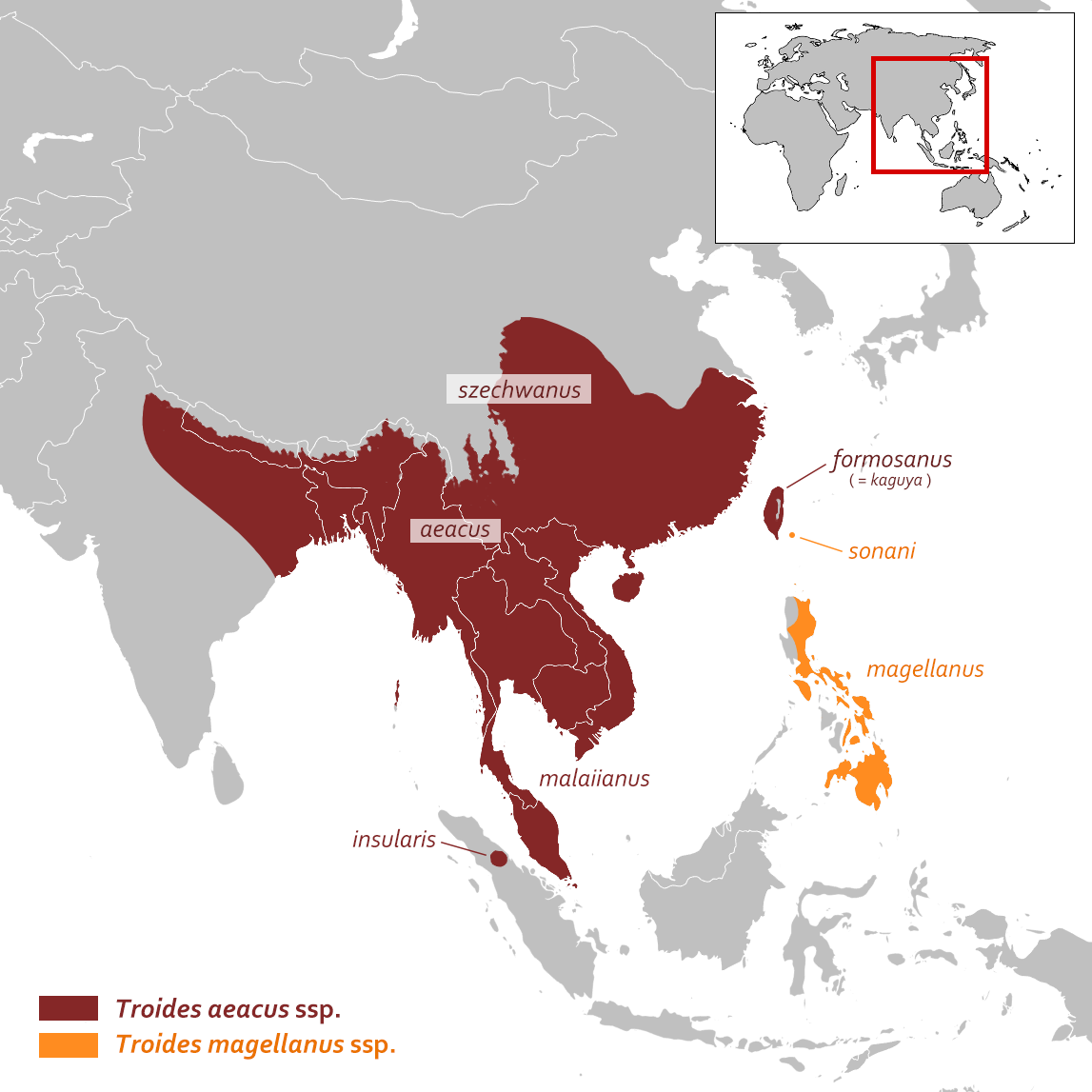
- Distribution map for Troides aeacus (red) and Troides magellanus (orange)

Synonyms
- Ornithoptera aeacus C. & R. Felder, 1860

= Troides aeacus =

Golden birdwing

Species of butterfly

Troides aeacus, the golden birdwing, is a large tropical butterfly belonging to the swallowtail family, Papilionidae.

== Description ==
Troides aeacus has a wingspan of about 150–170 millimetres (5.9–6.7 in) but can be as large as 194 mm. In the males the forewings are black, with veins bordered by a whitish colour, while the hindwings are bright yellow. The underside of the wings is quite similar to the upside. The females are larger than the males and have dark-brown or black wings. The head, thorax and abdomen of this butterfly are mainly black, with small red patches on the thorax and a yellow underside of the abdomen. Caterpillars are pale brown, with long protrusions resembling thorns. They mainly feed on Aristolochia and Thottea species (Aristolochiaceae).

Troides aeacus closely resembles Troides helena cerebrus and differs as follows:
Upperside, forewing: the pale adnervular streaks more prominent, in some specimens extended into the cell along the outer half of the subcostal and of the median nervules.
Hindwing: the cone-shaped terminal black markings in interspaces 2, 3, and 4 more or less broadly bordered on the inner side by a dusky area that is irrorated with blackish scales; the black on the costal margin narrower, not extended below vein 8.

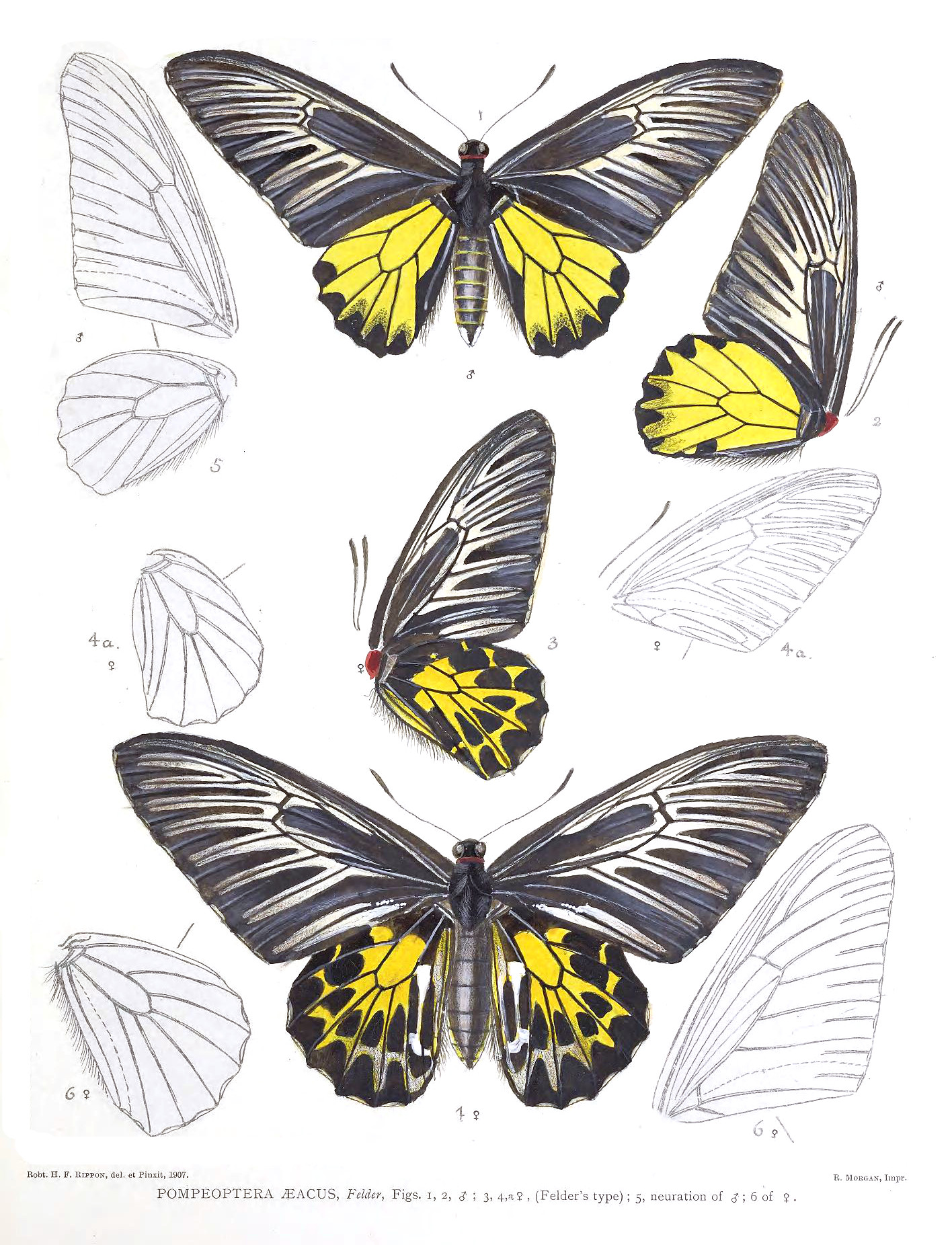
As Pompeoptera aeacus in Robert Henry Fernando Rippon's Icones Ornithopterorum (1898 to 1906)

Underside similar to the upperside, but the dusky black borders to the cone-shaped marks in interspaces 2, 3, and 4 wanting.

Antennae, head, thorax, abdomen and abdominal fold as in Troides helena cerebrus, but the abdomen beneath with two rows of black spots.

In the female the differences from cerebrus are:
Forewing: the pale adnervular streaks very broad, very prominent and extended well into the cell.
Hindwing: the basal third of the cell and of interspace 2 black, the middle portion of the latter yellow anteriorly, buffy-white posteriorly; the posterior half of the discal area between the postdiscal spots themselves and between them and the terminal cone-shaped markings more or less irrorated with blackish scales; lastly, the black in interspace 7 interrupted by an inner triangular and an outer small yellow spot.

Antennae, head, thorax and abdomen as in cerebrus, but the abdomen beneath with two lateral and two median rows of black spots.

== Range and status ==
It is found in northern India, Bangladesh, Nepal, Bhutan, Burma, China, Thailand, Laos, Vietnam, Cambodia, peninsular Malaysia, and Taiwan.

Although it is classified as a species of least concern by the IUCN Red List, it may require protection in peninsular Malaysia.

== Gallery ==
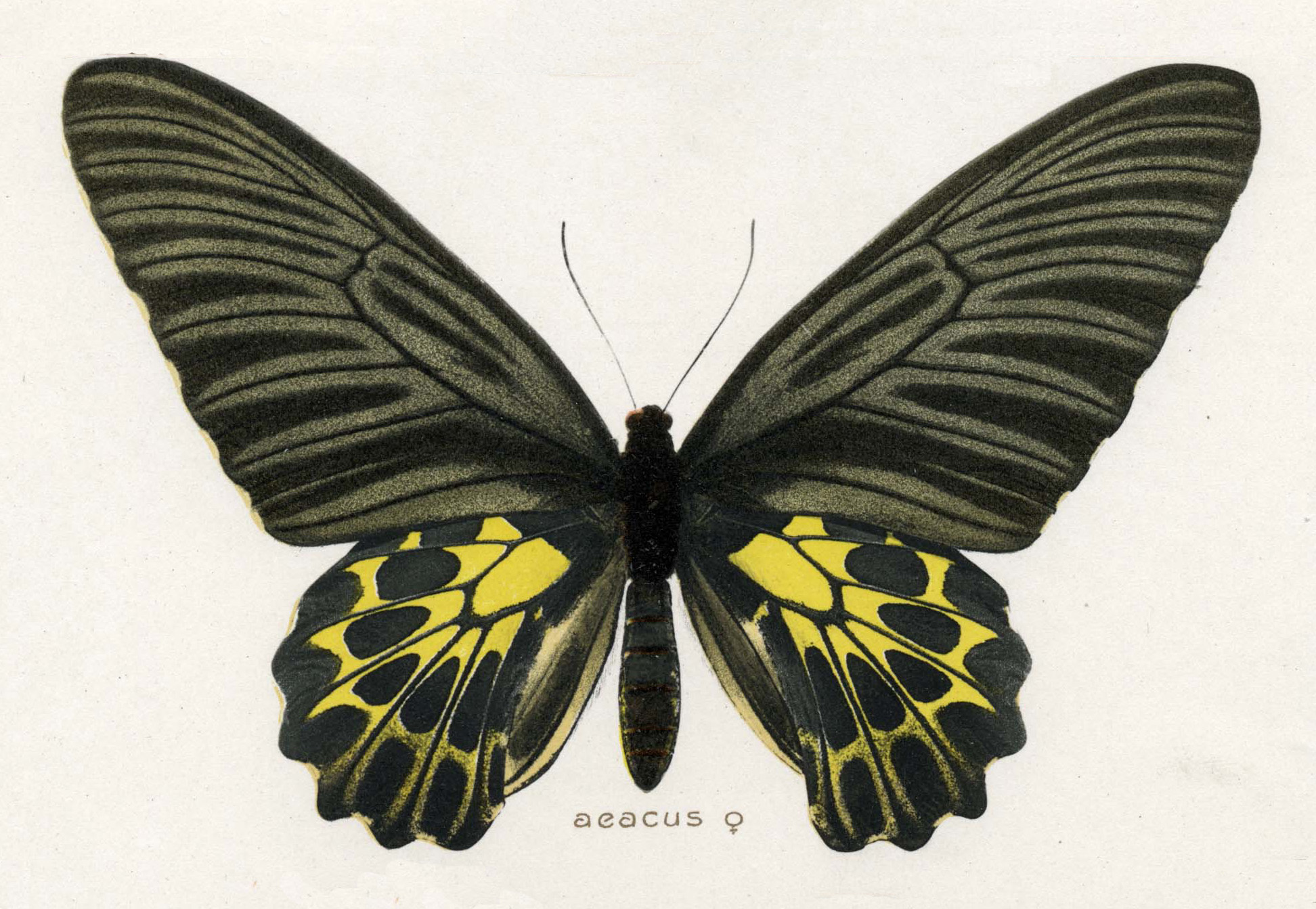
Female

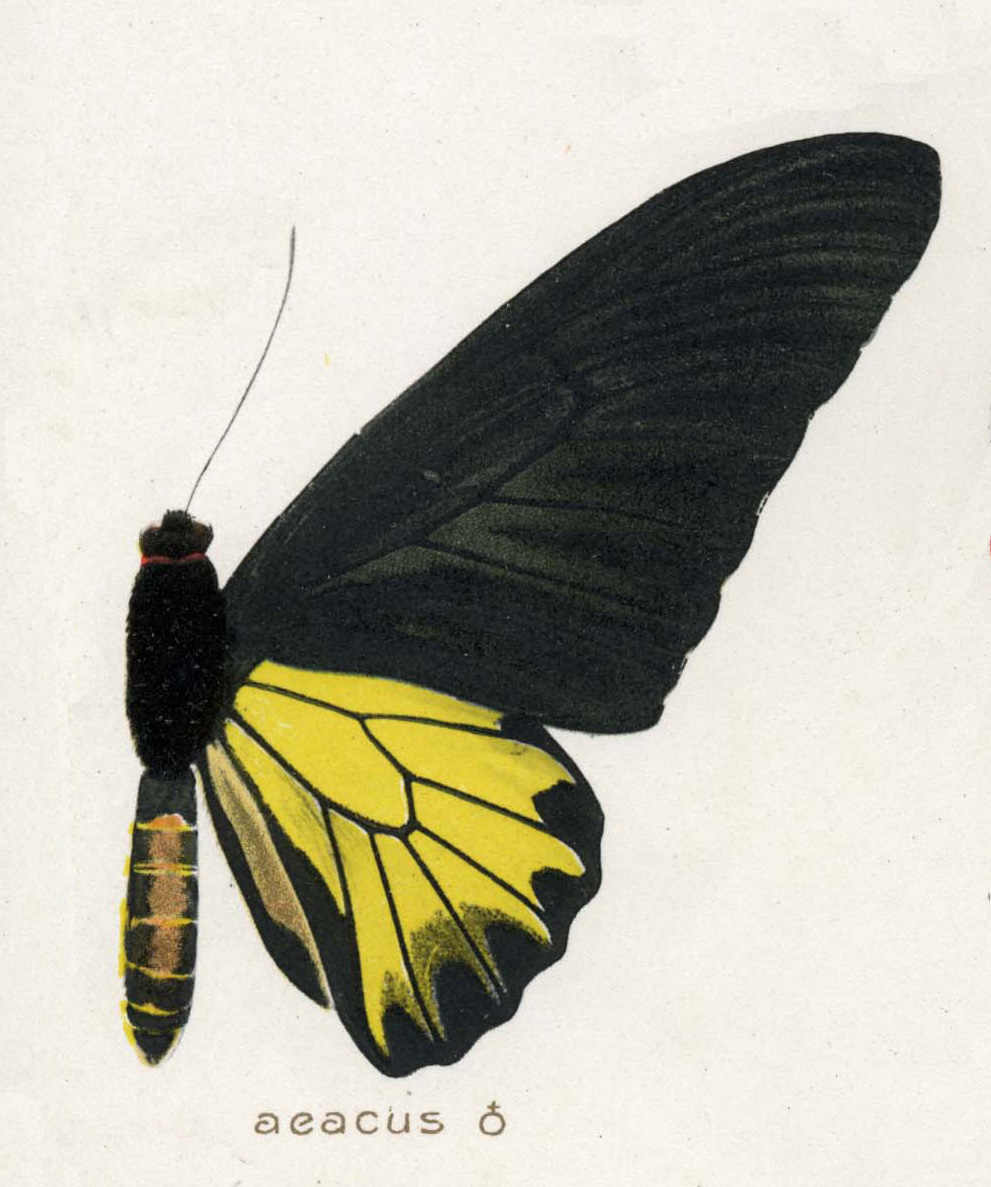
Male

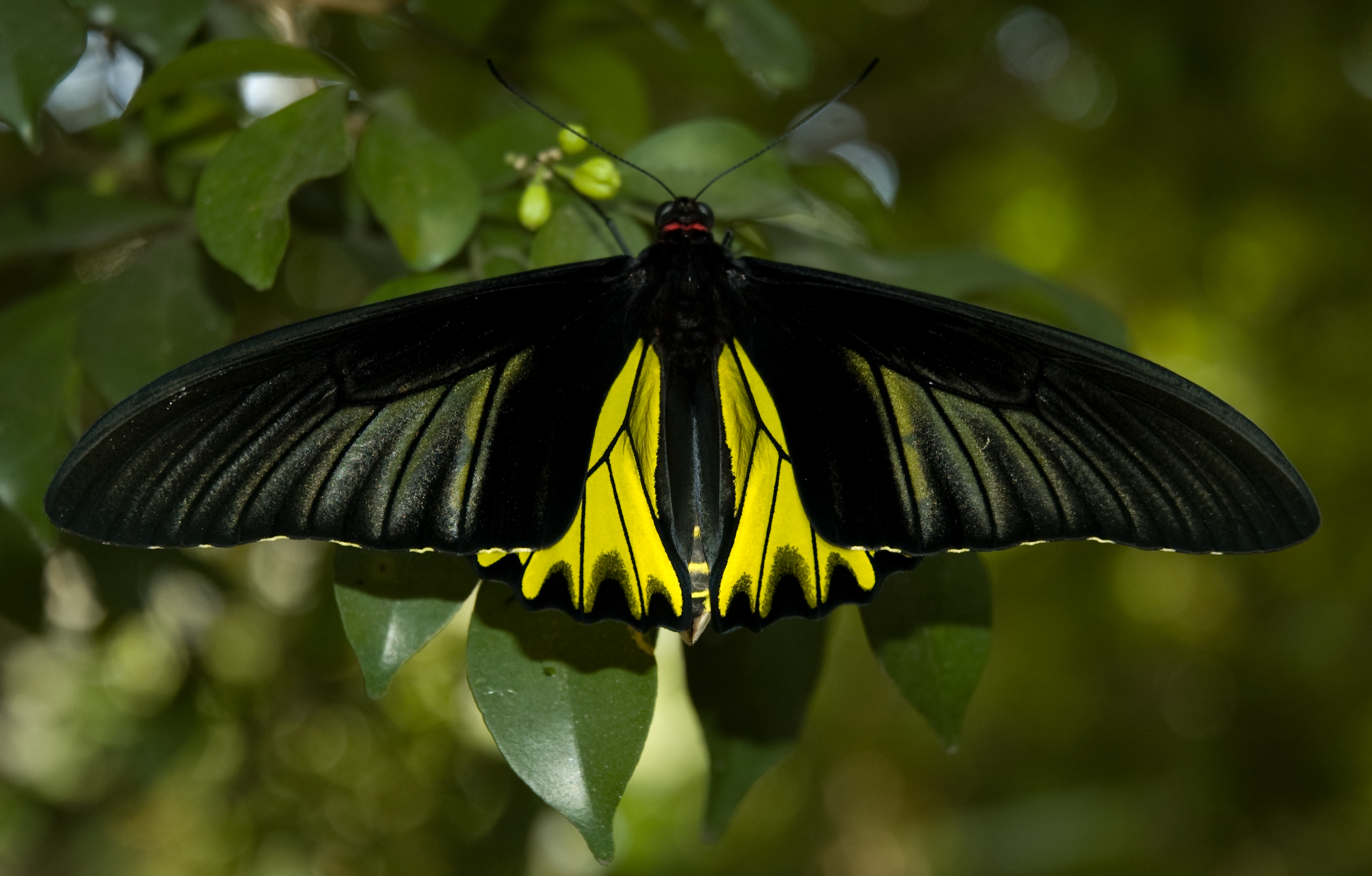

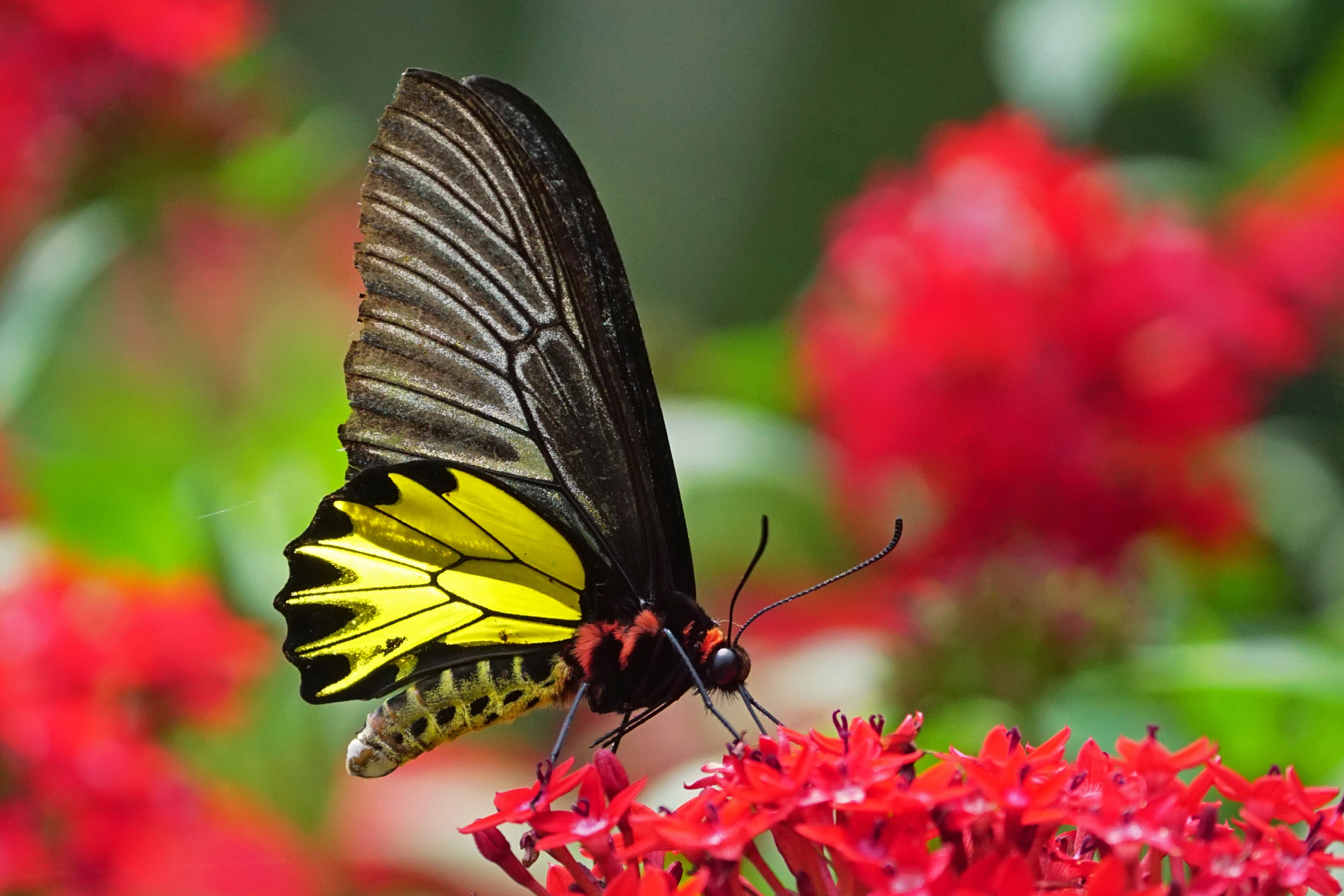
male T. a. formosanus

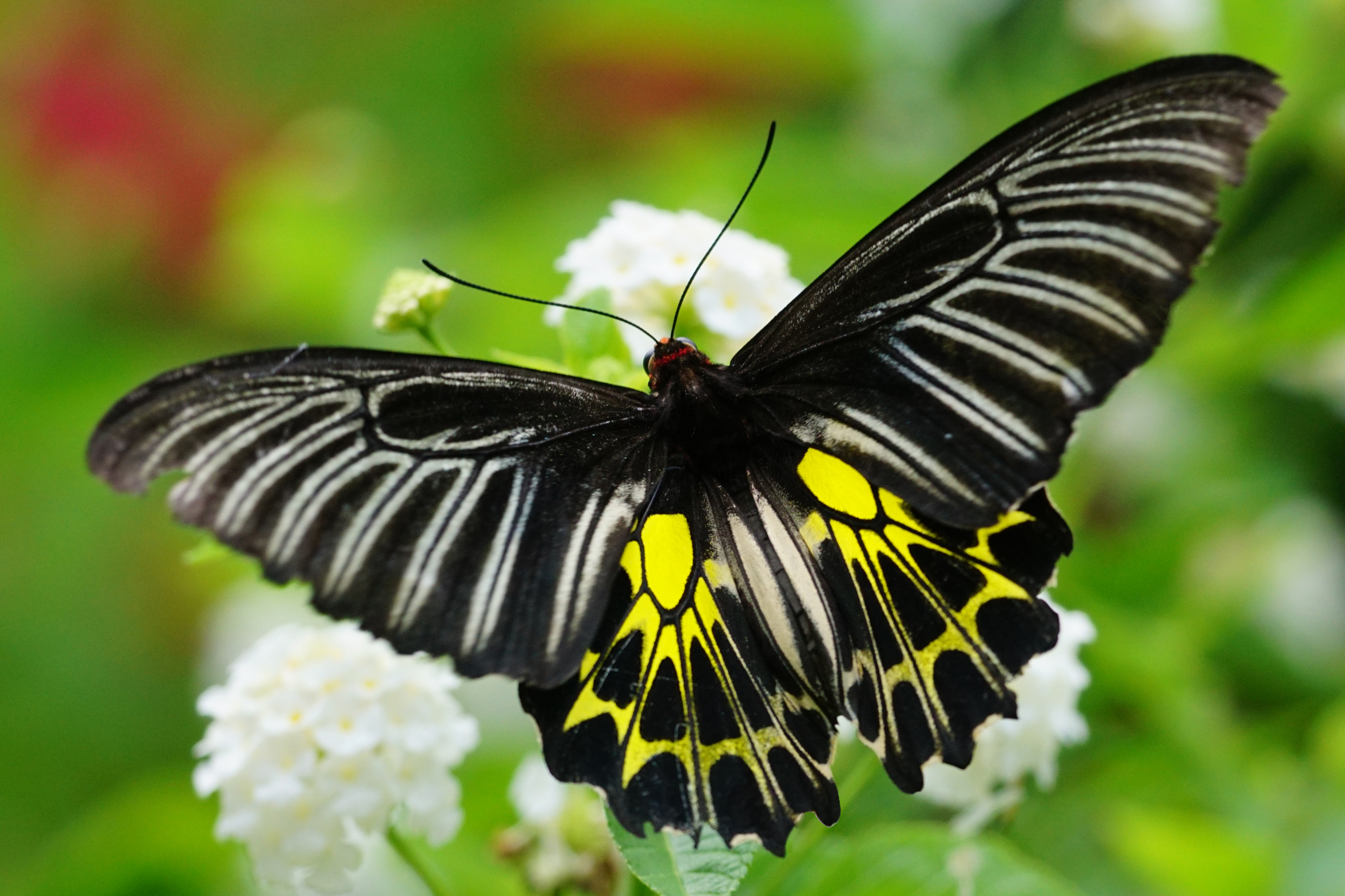
female T. a. formosanus

== Subspecies ==
- Troides aeacus aeacus
- Troides aeacus formosanus Rothschild, 1899
- Troides aeacus insularis Ney, 1905
- Troides aeacus malaiianus Fruhstorfer, 1902
- Troides aeacus szechwanus Okano & Okano, 1983

== Related species ==
Troides aecus is the nominate member of the Troides aecus species group. The members of this clade are

- Troides aeacus C. & R. Felder, 1860
- Troides magellanus (C. & R. Felder, 1862)
- Troides minos (Cramer, [1779])
- Troides rhadamantus (Lucas, 1835)
- Troides dohertyi (Rippon, 1893)
- Troides prattorum (Joicey & Talbot, 1922)

== See also ==
- Papilionidae
- List of butterflies of India
- List of butterflies of India (Papilionidae)
