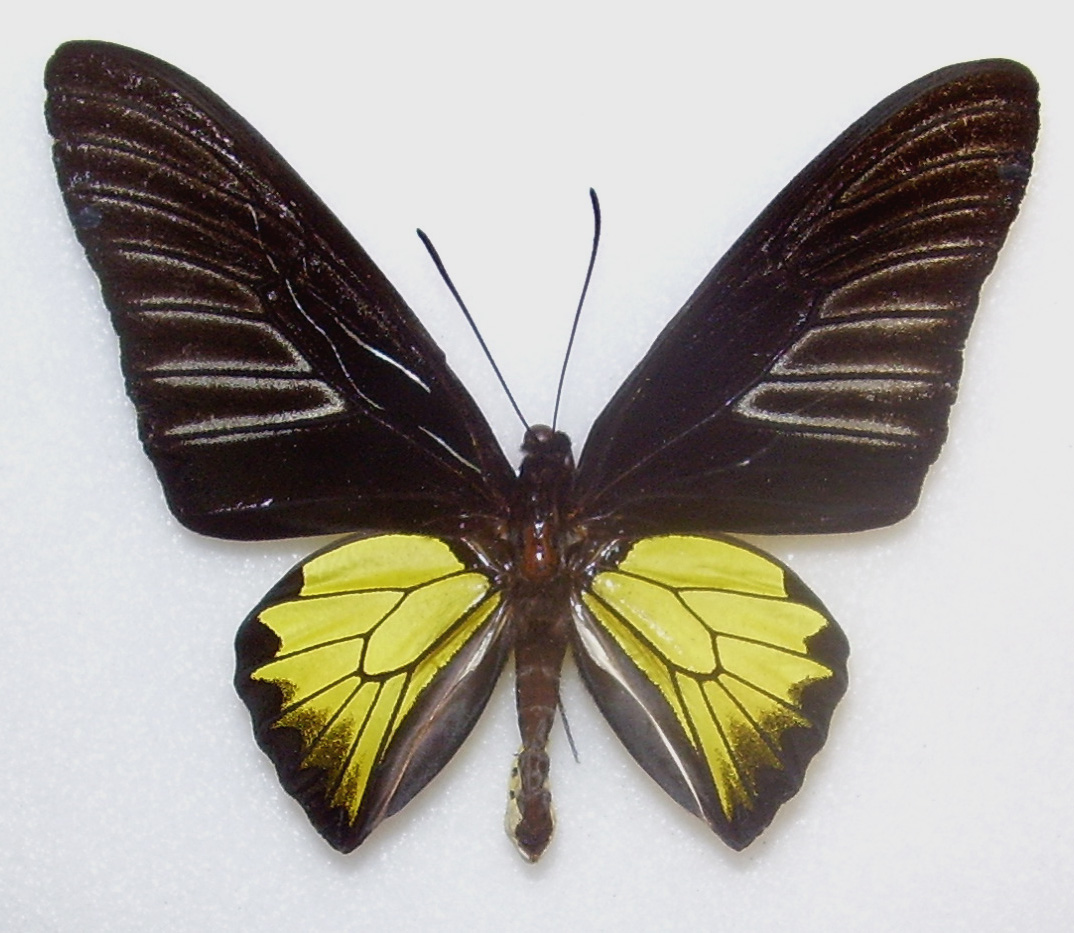
- Male, upperside

Conservation status
- CITES Appendix II (CITES)

Scientific classification
- Domain: Eukaryota
- Kingdom: Animalia
- Phylum: Arthropoda
- Class: Insecta
- Order: Lepidoptera
- Family: Papilionidae
- Genus: Troides
- Species: T. rhadamantus

Binomial name
- Troides rhadamantus (H. Lucas, 1835)

= Troides rhadamantus =

Golden birdwing

Species of butterfly

Troides rhadamantus flying, captured in Luzon, Philippines

Troides rhadamantus, the tropical golden birdwing, is a birdwing butterfly that inhabits the Philippines. The species was first described by Hippolyte Lucas in 1835. There are many subspecies on islands of the Philippines and some authors consider Troides plateni and Troides dohertyi as subspecies of T. rhadamantus.

Troides rhadamantus is a butterfly with a large wingspan, between 140 mm and 160 mm, with very slightly scalloped hindwings.

The male has black forewings with veins edged with white. The hindwings are yellow with black veins and a marginal band of black triangles.

The female, larger than the male, has black forewings, decorated with veins more widely edged with white. The hindwings are yellow with black veins, and broadly edged with black.

Biology Host plants The host plants of its caterpillar are aristolochia, Aristolochia acuminata, Aristolochia elegans, Aristolochia philippensis, Aristolochia ramosi and Aristolochia tagala

== Related species ==
Troides rhadamantus is a member of the Troides aeacus species group. The members of this clade are:

- Troides aeacus (C. Felder & R. Felder, 1860)
- Troides magellanus (C. Felder & R. Felder, 1862)
- Troides minos (Cramer, [1779])
- Troides rhadamantus (H. Lucas, 1835)
- Troides dohertyi (Rippon, 1893)
- Troides prattorum (Joicey & Talbot, 1922)
