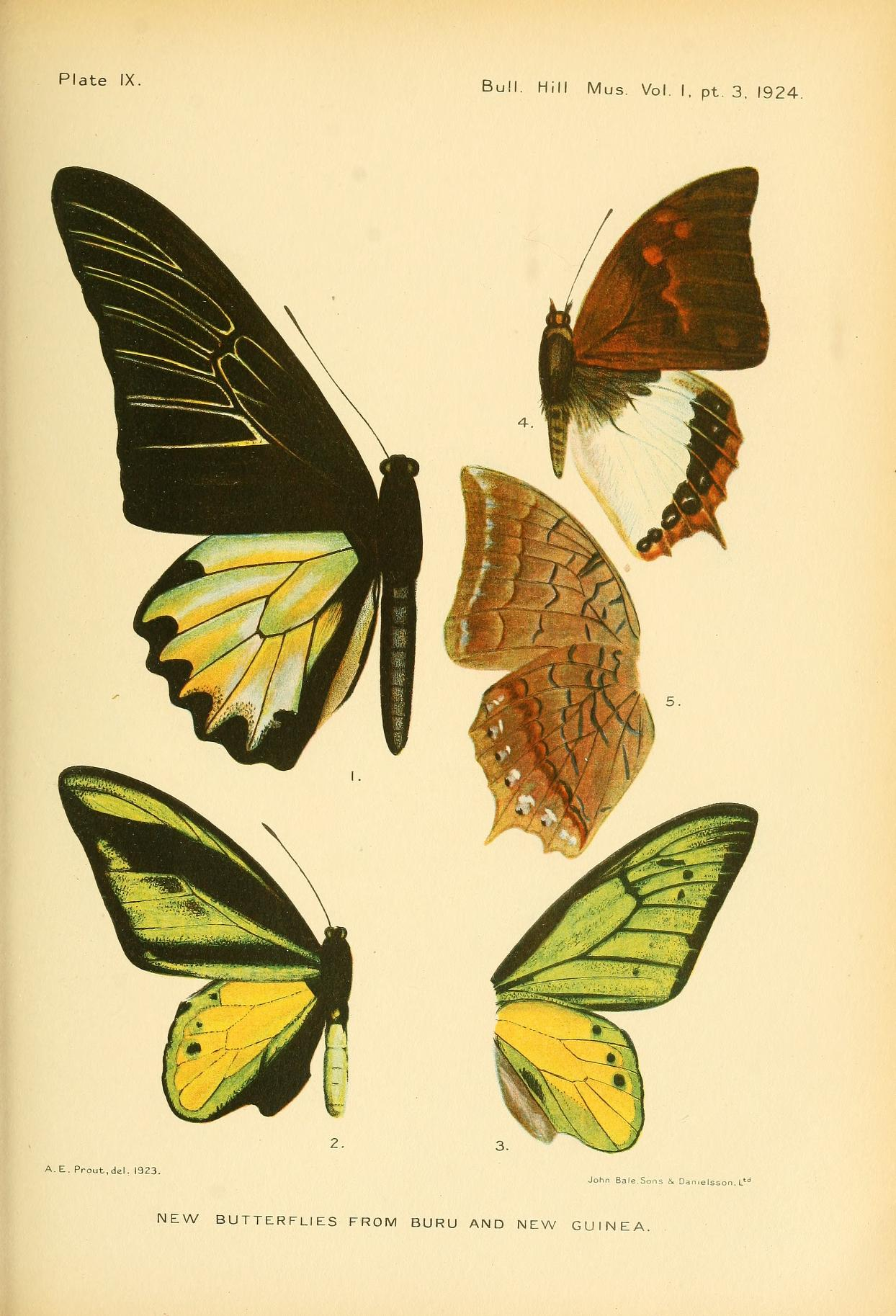
- Troides prattorum plate by A.E.Pratt which accompanied the original description
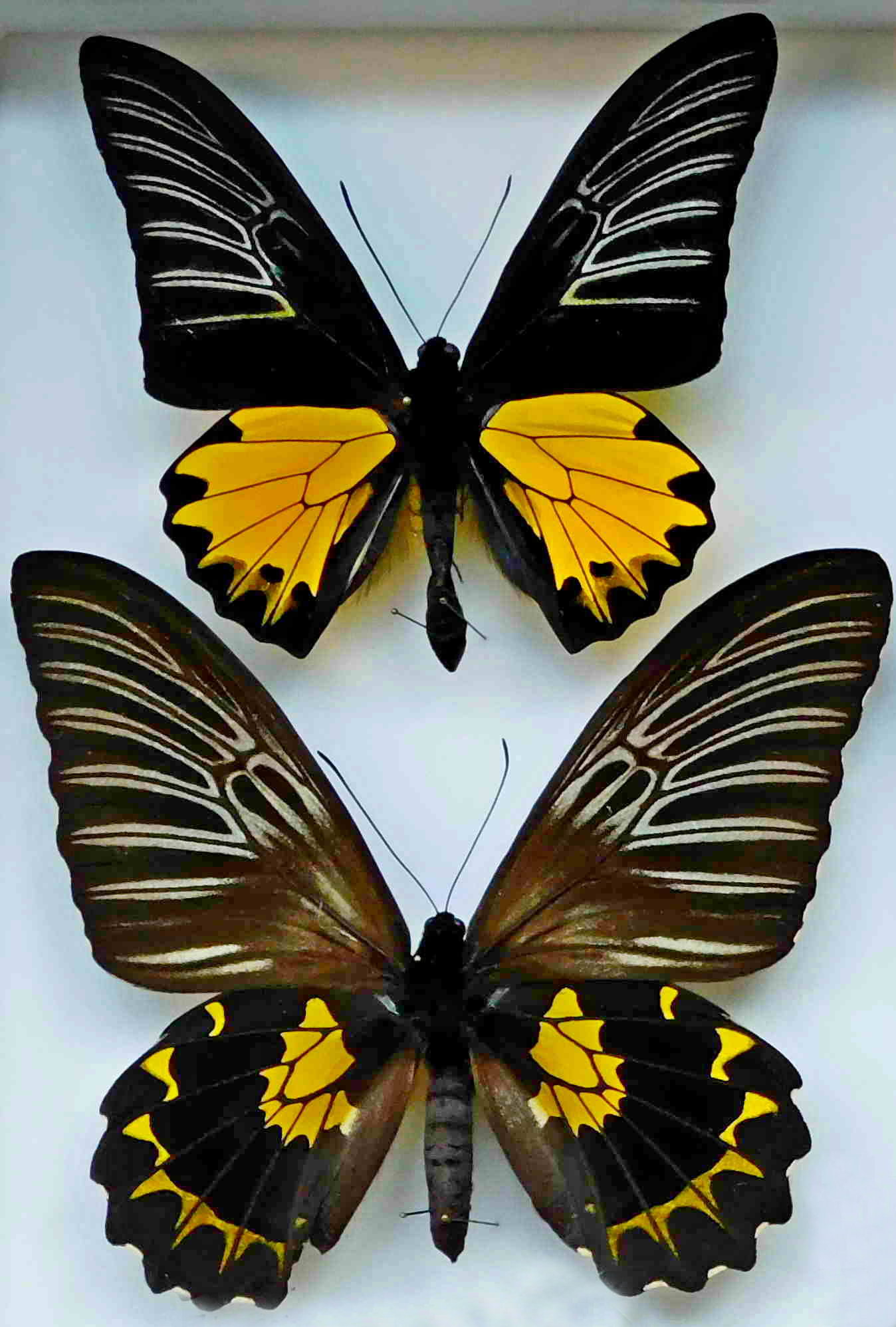
- Troides prattorum male and female

Conservation status
- Vulnerable (IUCN 3.1)
- CITES Appendix II

Scientific classification
- Kingdom: Animalia
- Phylum: Arthropoda
- Clade: Pancrustacea
- Class: Insecta
- Order: Lepidoptera
- Family: Papilionidae
- Genus: Troides
- Species: T. prattorum

Binomial name
- Troides prattorum (Joicey & Talbot,1922)

= Troides prattorum =

Buru opalescent birdwing

Species of butterfly

Troides prattorum, the Buru Opalescent Birdwing, is a species of butterfly in the family Papilionidae. It is endemic to Buru in the Maluku Islands of Indonesia.

Troides prattorum is a butterfly with a large wingspan, varying from 150 mm to 170 mm with a black body.

The forewings are black in the male, dark brown or black in the female with veins edged with white. The hindwings are seen yellow or green or blue by an optical effect. They are veined with black and edged with a black festoon.

Females are larger than males

It is commercially bred, but supplies of this butterfly are sporadic, so it is still very rare in collections.

== Related species ==
Troides prattorum is a member of the Troides aeacus species group. The members of this clade are:

- Troides aeacus C. & R. Felder, 1860
- Troides magellanus (C. & R. Felder, 1862)
- Troides minos (Cramer, [1779])
- Troides rhadamantus (Lucas, 1835)
- Troides dohertyi (Rippon, 1893)
- Troides prattorum (Joicey & Talbot, 1922)
