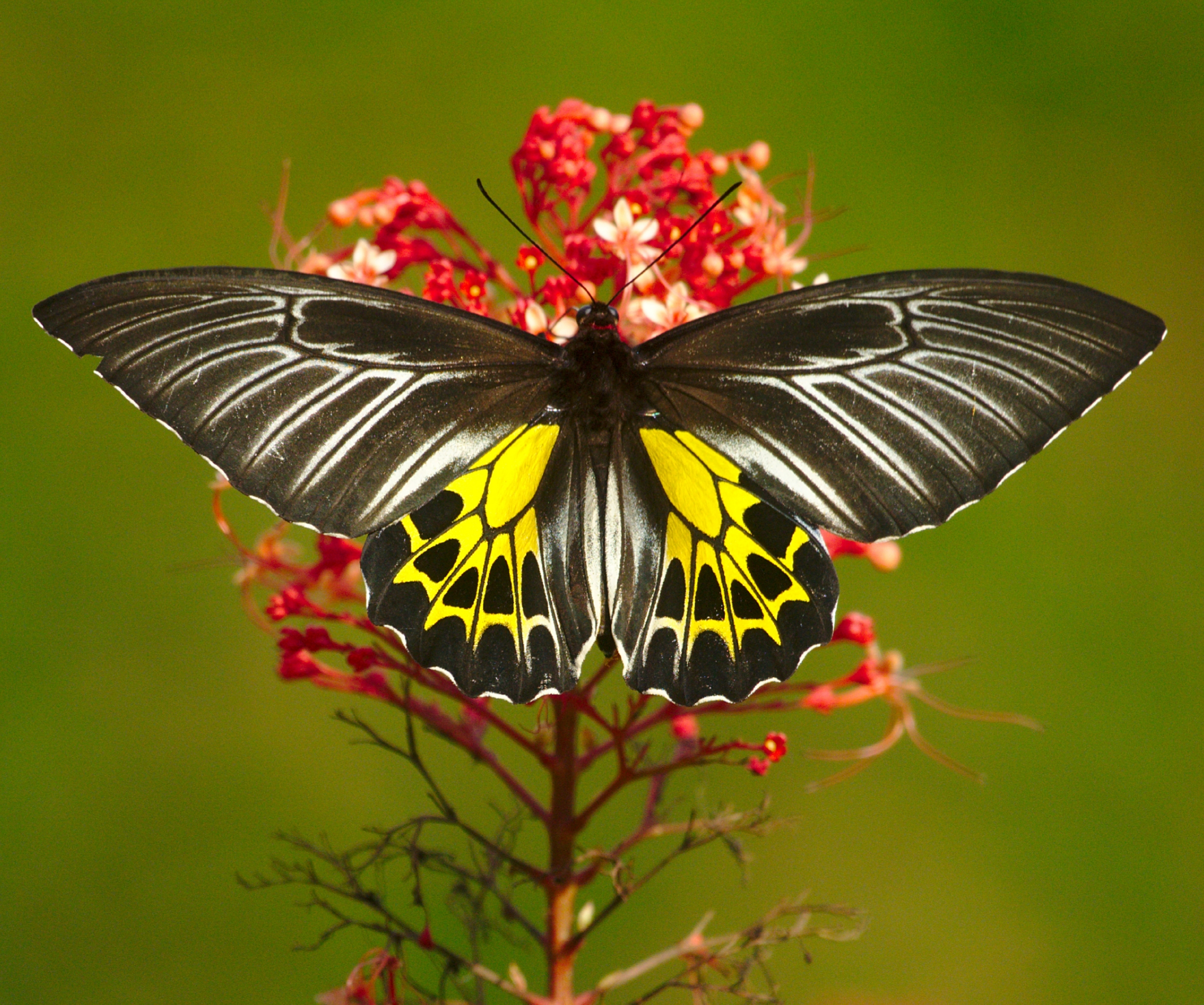
- CITES Appendix II

Scientific classification
- Kingdom: Animalia
- Phylum: Arthropoda
- Clade: Pancrustacea
- Class: Insecta
- Order: Lepidoptera
- Family: Papilionidae
- Genus: Troides
- Species: T. minos

Binomial name
- Troides minos Cramer, 1779

= Troides minos =

Southern birdwing

Species of butterfly

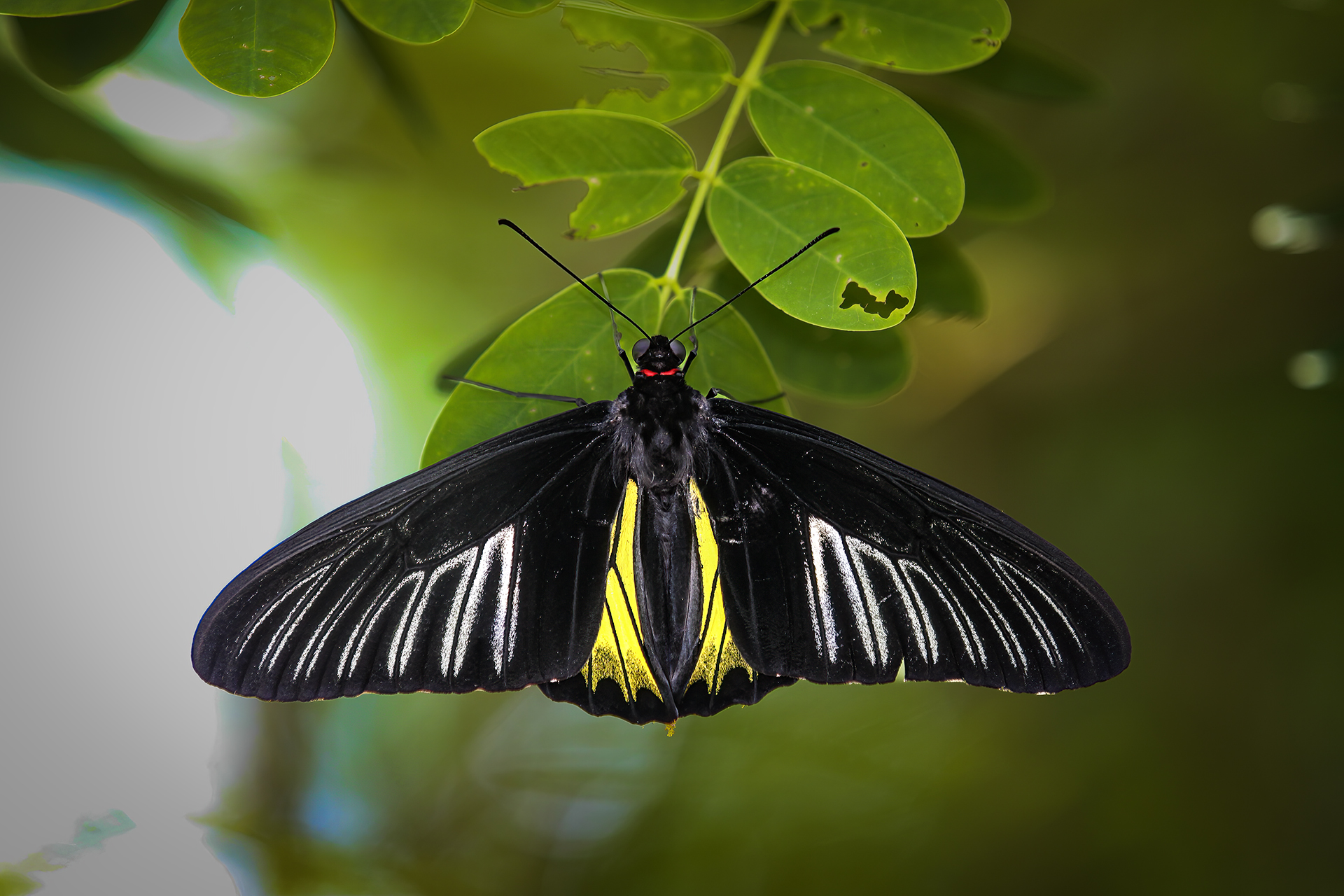
A Southern birdwing imago at The Key West Butterfly & Nature Conservatory in 2011

Troides minos, the southern birdwing, also called Sahyadri birdwing, is a large and striking species of swallowtail butterfly. It is endemic to southern India. With a wingspan of 140–190 mm, it is the second largest butterfly of India. It is listed as Least Concern in the IUCN Red List.

It was earlier considered a subspecies of the common birdwing (Troides helena) but is now recognised as a valid species.

The species is more common in the Western Ghats of southern India, which is a biodiversity hotspot with a high degree of endemism in many taxa. It is much sought after by collectors and is a highlight of many butterfly tours in the Western Ghats. It is the state butterfly of Karnataka, India.

== Description ==
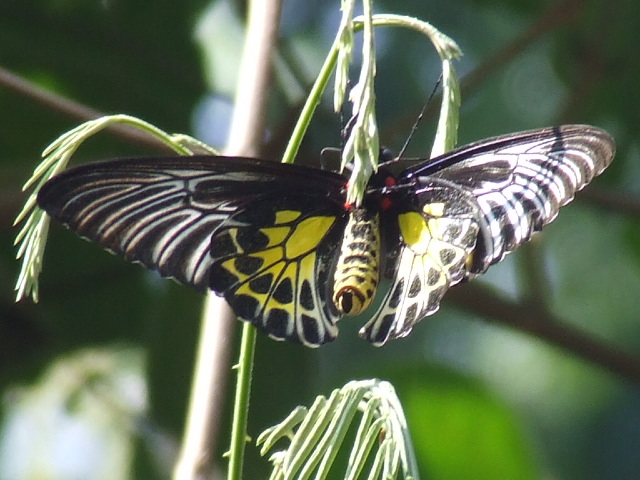
Underside of female

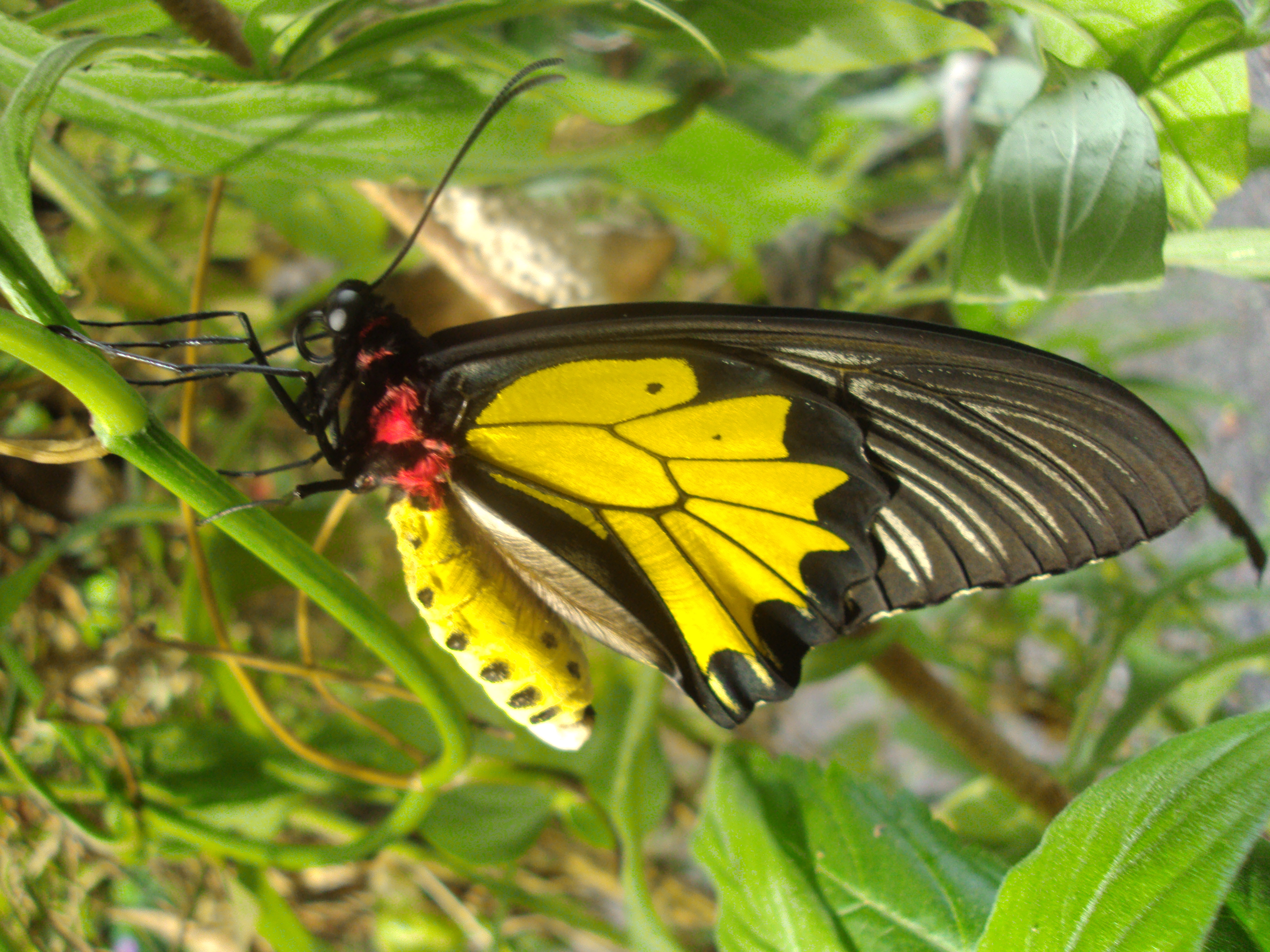

Description from Charles Thomas Bingham (1907) The Fauna of British India, Including Ceylon and Burma, Butterflies. Volume II.

Male and female. Differs from Troides helena cerberus as follows.

- Male: Hindwing: the black along the dorsal and terminal margins both on upper and undersides much broader; on the upperside entirely filling interspace 1, on the underside with only a narrow streak of yellow at the angle between the median vein and vein 2; the cone-shaped black markings on the terminal margin shorter and broader; on the costal margin the black is narrower than in cerberus, barely extended below vein 8 except at the base and apex of the wing where it broadens; the abdomen is dull yellow above and below not shaded with black.
- Female: Hindwing: the black on the costal margin as in cerberus, but there is always a large yellow spot at base of interspace 7; interspace 1 black, with a pale patch in the middle; the black terminal border broader, the inwardly extended cone-shaped markings prominent, those in interspaces 2 and 3 with pale buff lateral edgings, extended inwards to the postdiscal spots. In both male and female the hindwing on the upperside is clothed with soft, silky, long brownish-black hairs from base along the dorsal area.
- Expanse: 140–190 mm.
- Habitat: Southern India. Bombay to Travancore.
- Larva. Roughly cylindrical, tapers a little to each end, with two rows of fleshy processes somewhat curved forwards and a double row on each side that are much shorter. On the 2nd, 3rd and 4th segments an additional long pair between the dorsal and lateral rows. Head smooth and black; body of a uniform dark madder brown, prettily lighted with a tinge of pink at the points of some of the fleshy processes; dorsal process on the 8th segment and a lateral pair on the 7th pinkish-white, with a band of the same colour uniting them.
- Pupa. Suspended by the tail and a band that encircles it much nearer the head than is usual with Papilio pupae. In form stout, flattened, dilated in the middle, with head and thorax thrown back. Head somewhat angular and tuberculated; two of the abdominal segments each with a prominent dorsal pair of pointed tubercles. Colour usually light brown, with a strongly contrasting saddle of old gold. (After Davidson & Aitken) - Mr T. A. Sealy (Proc. Ent Soc. 1875 p. 9) states- "The pupa possesses the power of making a curious noise like pha-pha!, and makes it very loudly when touched; the noise is accompanied (perhaps produced) by a short contraction of the abdominal segments. I thought at first it was merely produced by the rubbing of one ring of the pupa-case against the next, but the sound did not resemble a mere frictional sound, it was more like the sound of a rush of air through small holes. I tried to produce it with a dead chrysalis but failed: the pupa sometimes contracted on being touched without making the noise, and appeared unable to make the noise until some time was given to allow it to recover its vigour." Messrs. Davidson and Aitken have also noticed this power in the pupa, but they speak of it "as a husky squeaking noise, produced apparently by friction of the abdominal rings."

== Distribution and habitat ==
Western Ghats and parts of the Eastern Ghats.

The Southern birdwing is found up to 3,000 feet (910 m) in the Western Ghats. Found in diverse habitats from low-land evergreen forests near the coast to mixed deciduous forests, dry scrub and agricultural fields.

== Status ==
The southern birdwing is locally very common in the southern and central Western Ghats covering the states of Karnataka and Kerala. Also found in southern Maharashtra and northern Goa where it is uncommon. Despite its restricted range and endemicity, the butterfly is not known to be threatened but the IUCN recommends continuous monitoring.

== Habits ==
Active during early morning hours when both sexes feed in the forest on Lantana and diverse food plants. Later on, it is seen sailing as high as 30 to 40 feet (9.1 to 12.2 m) over the countryside until it descends later in the evening to feed again. It flies in a leisurely manner circling around jungle clearings and also frequents hill tops. A determined flier, it is known to cover very large distances before settling. The only food source is nectar, it also visits gardens and orchards and sips from domestic plants such as Mussaenda, Ixora and Lantana.

== Life cycle ==
Though it flies all the year round, it is abundant in the during monsoon and post-monsoon periods.

=== Eggs ===
Spherical eggs laid singly on the edges of the undersides of young leaves and shoots.

=== Larva ===
Velvety maroon red with shiny black head and four rows of fleshy bright red tubercles. Grey markings on the back with a broad oblique pink white band on the 7th and 8th segments. These are heavily parasitised by tiny braconid wasps.

=== Pupa ===
Pale brown or green, marked with fine brown striations and minute markings. Found on the underside of leaves. If touched, it sways and makes hissing sounds.

Life cycle

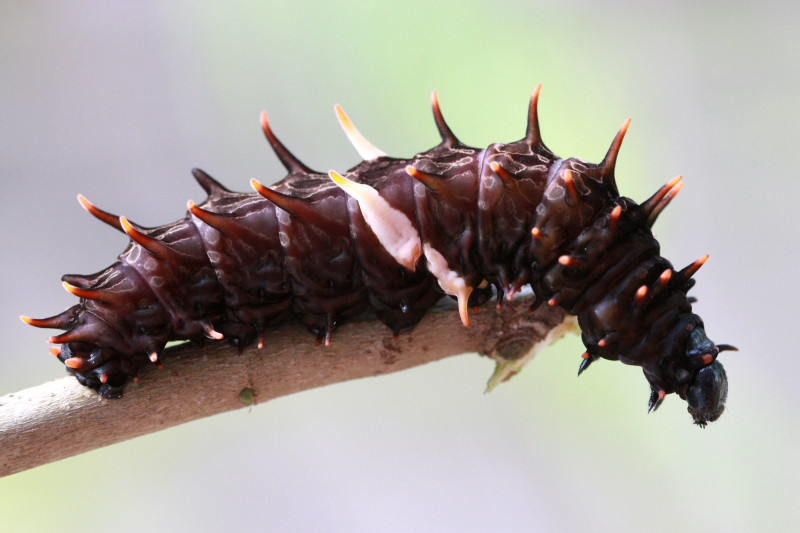
Larva

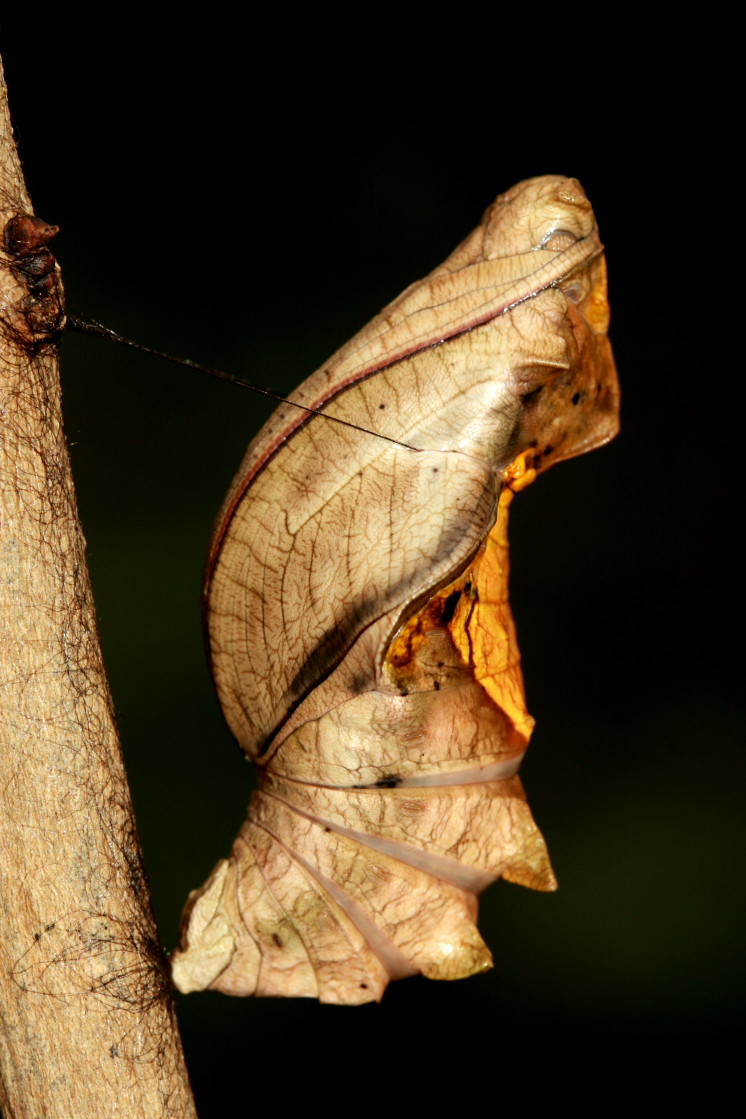
Pupa

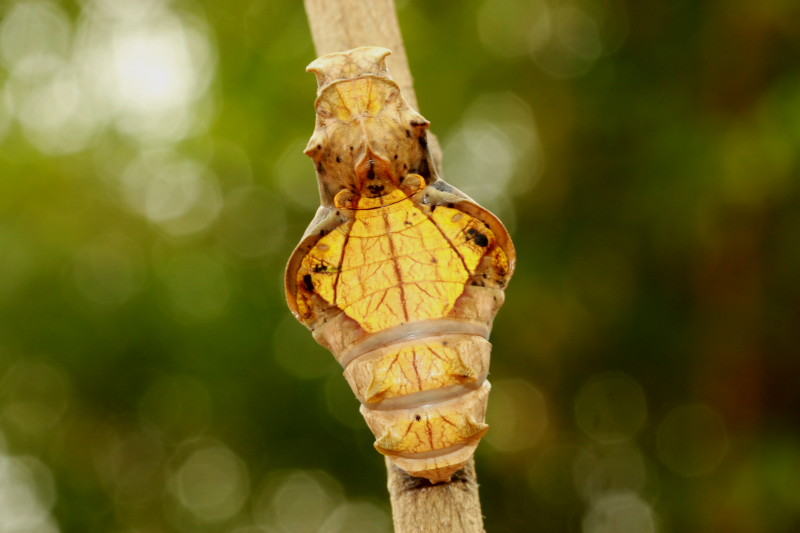
Pupa

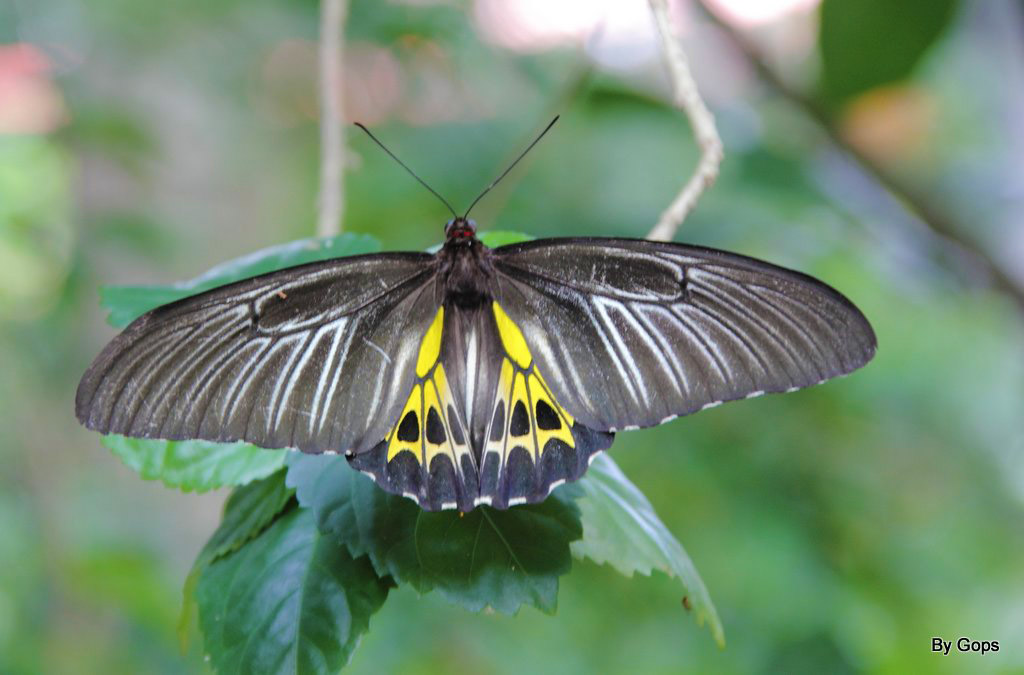
Imago (dorsal view)

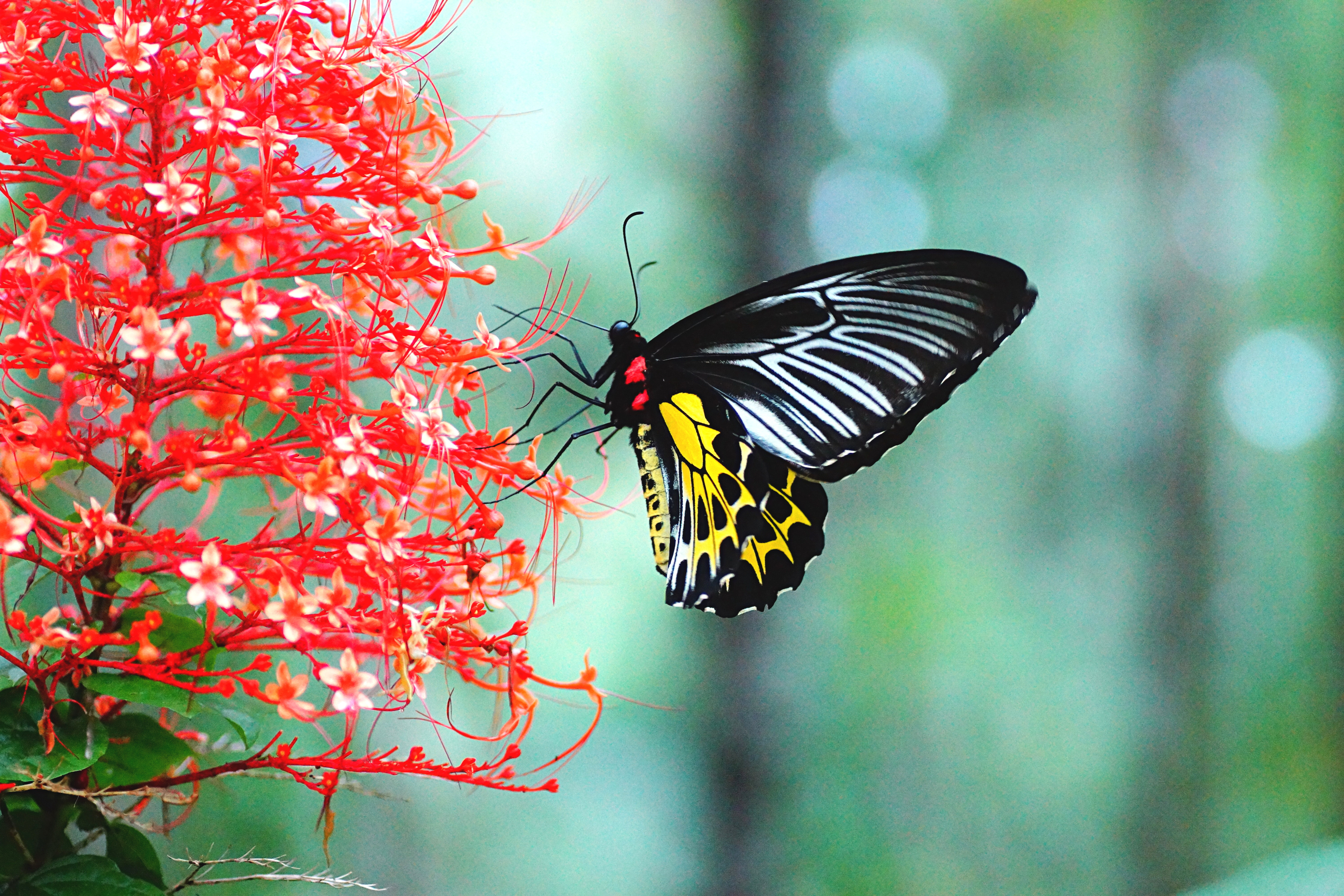
Imago (ventral view)

== Food plants ==
The larval host plants of these butterflies are small creepers and climbers of the family Aristolochiaceae such as Aristolochia indica, Aristolochia tagala, Thottea siliquosa and Bragantia wallichii The host plant toxins sequestered by the butterfly during its larval stage make it unpalatable to predators. Its flight and bright colouration advertise its unpalatability.

== Related species ==
Troides minos is a member of the Troides aecus species group. The members of this clade are:

- Troides aeacus C. & R. Felder, 1860
- Troides magellanus (C. & R. Felder, 1862)
- Troides minos (Cramer, [1779])
- Troides rhadamantus (Lucas, 1835)
- Troides dohertyi (Rippon, 1893)
- Troides prattorum (Joicey & Talbot, 1922)

== See also ==
- Papilionidae
- List of butterflies of India
- List of butterflies of India (Papilionidae)
