= Rippon (surname) =

Rippon is a surname. Notable people with the surname include:

- Adam Rippon (born 1989), American figure skater
- Angela Rippon (born 1944), British journalist
- Geoffrey Rippon (1924–1997), British politician
- John Rippon (1751–1836), English Baptist minister
- Peter Rippon (born 1965), British broadcasting executive
- Robert Henry Fernando Rippon (1836–1917), English zoologist and illustrator
- Ted Rippon (1914–1991), Australian footballer

== See also ==
- Rippin (surname)
