= Rippin (surname) =

Rippin is a surname. Notable people with the surname include:

- Andrew Rippin (1950–2016), Canadian Islamic studies scholar
- Jane Deeter Rippin (1882–1953, née Deeter), American social worker
- Niamh Rippin (born 1994), British gymnast
- Sally Rippin, Australian children's writer and illustrator

== See also ==
- Rippon (surname)
- Rypin, redirected from Rippin
