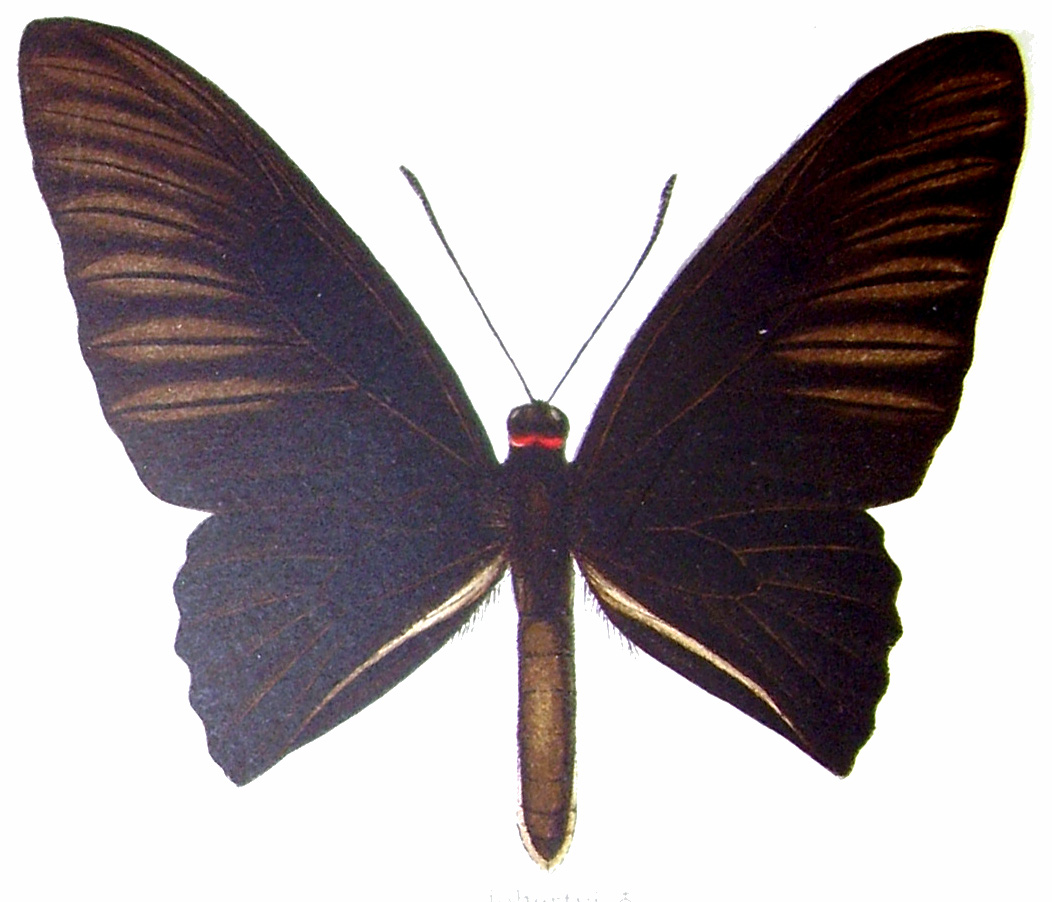
- Male, upperside
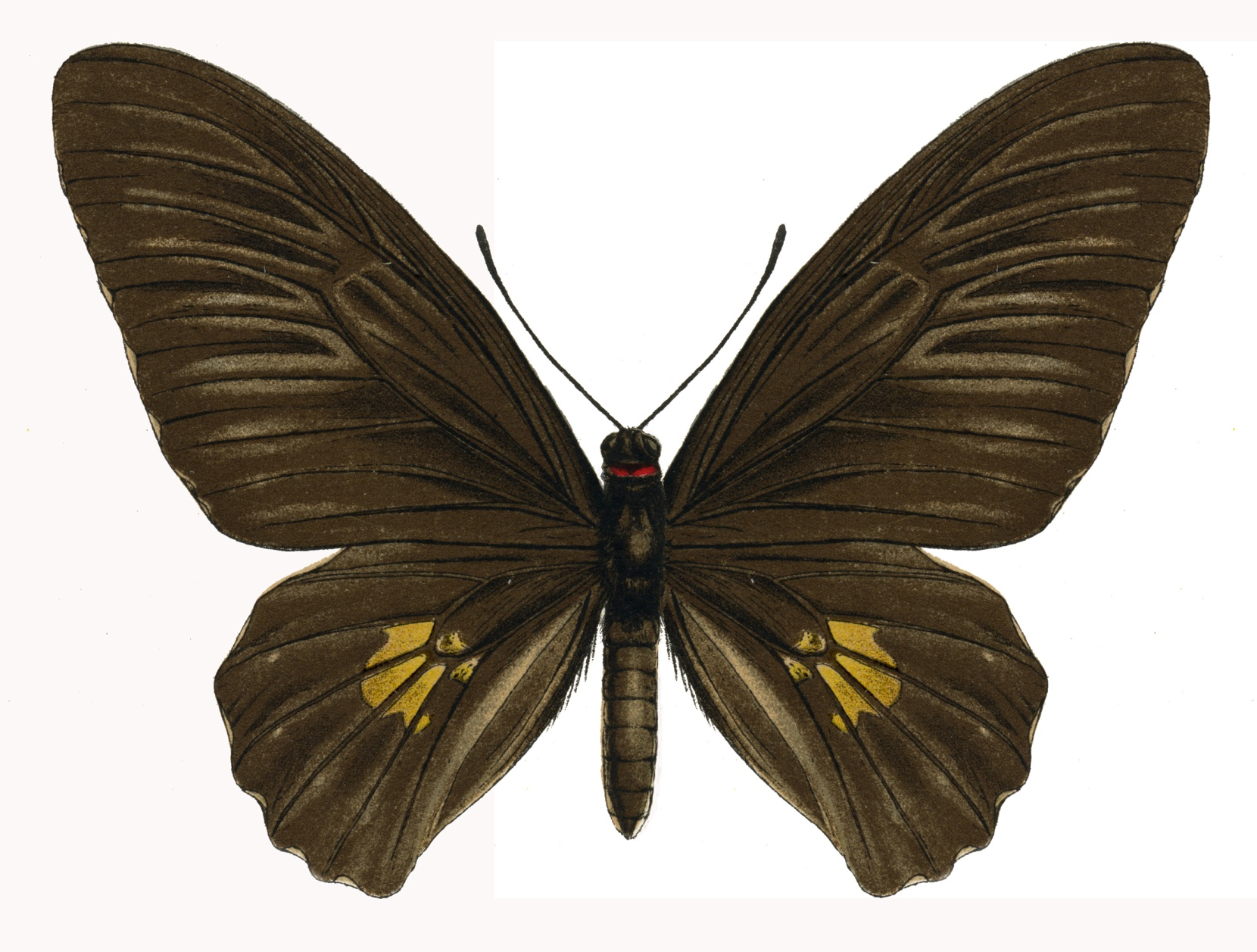
- Female, upperside

Conservation status
- Vulnerable (IUCN 2.3)
- CITES Appendix II

Scientific classification
- Kingdom: Animalia
- Phylum: Arthropoda
- Class: Insecta
- Order: Lepidoptera
- Family: Papilionidae
- Genus: Troides
- Species: T. dohertyi

Binomial name
- Troides dohertyi Rippon, 1903

= Troides dohertyi =

Talaud black birdwing

Species of butterfly

Troides dohertyi, the Talaud black birdwing, is a birdwing butterfly endemic to the Talaud and Sangihe islands.

This species is ranked as a subspecies of Troides rhadamantus by some authors.

== Description ==
Size range: 140 to 160 mm (females) wingspan.

Male: The male is unique among birdwings, being almost entirely black on the upperside forewings and hindwings. The underside of the hindwing has the golden markings typical of Troides species but sometimes reduced. Rarely males have faint suggestions of gold colouration on the upper surface of their hindwing. Females may show yellow markings on their hindwings, and both sexes have whitish to tan stripes on their forewings (veins are bordered by white colour).

Female: is sexually dimorphic. The female covers the upper range of the wingspan. It is significantly larger than the male. The basic colour of the female is dark brown. The veins are bordered by white. There is a small yellow area with dark veins on the hindwings. The underside is a similar to the upperside.

The abdomen is light brown, but the underside is yellow. Head and thorax are black. The underside of thorax has a red hair coat.

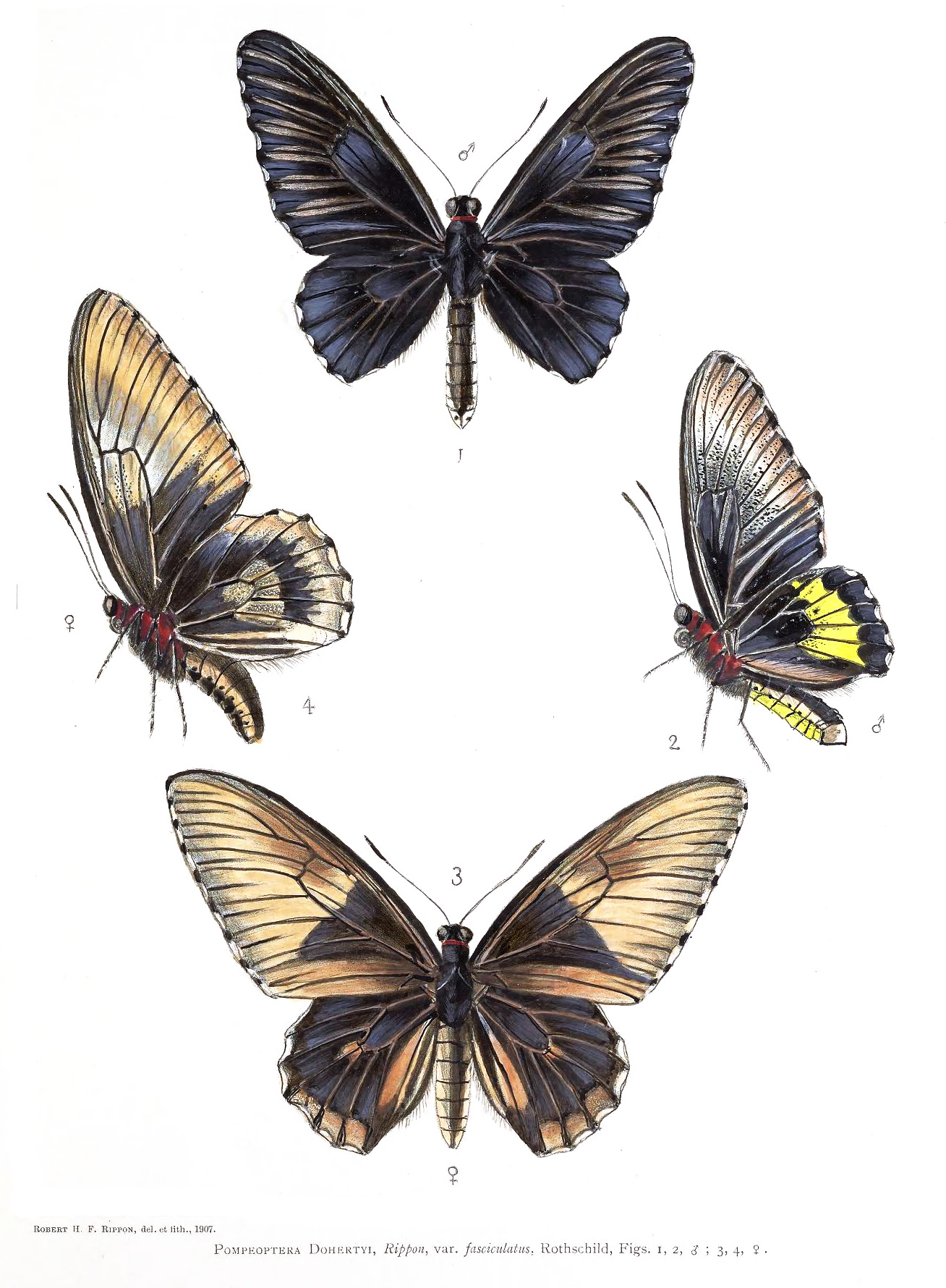

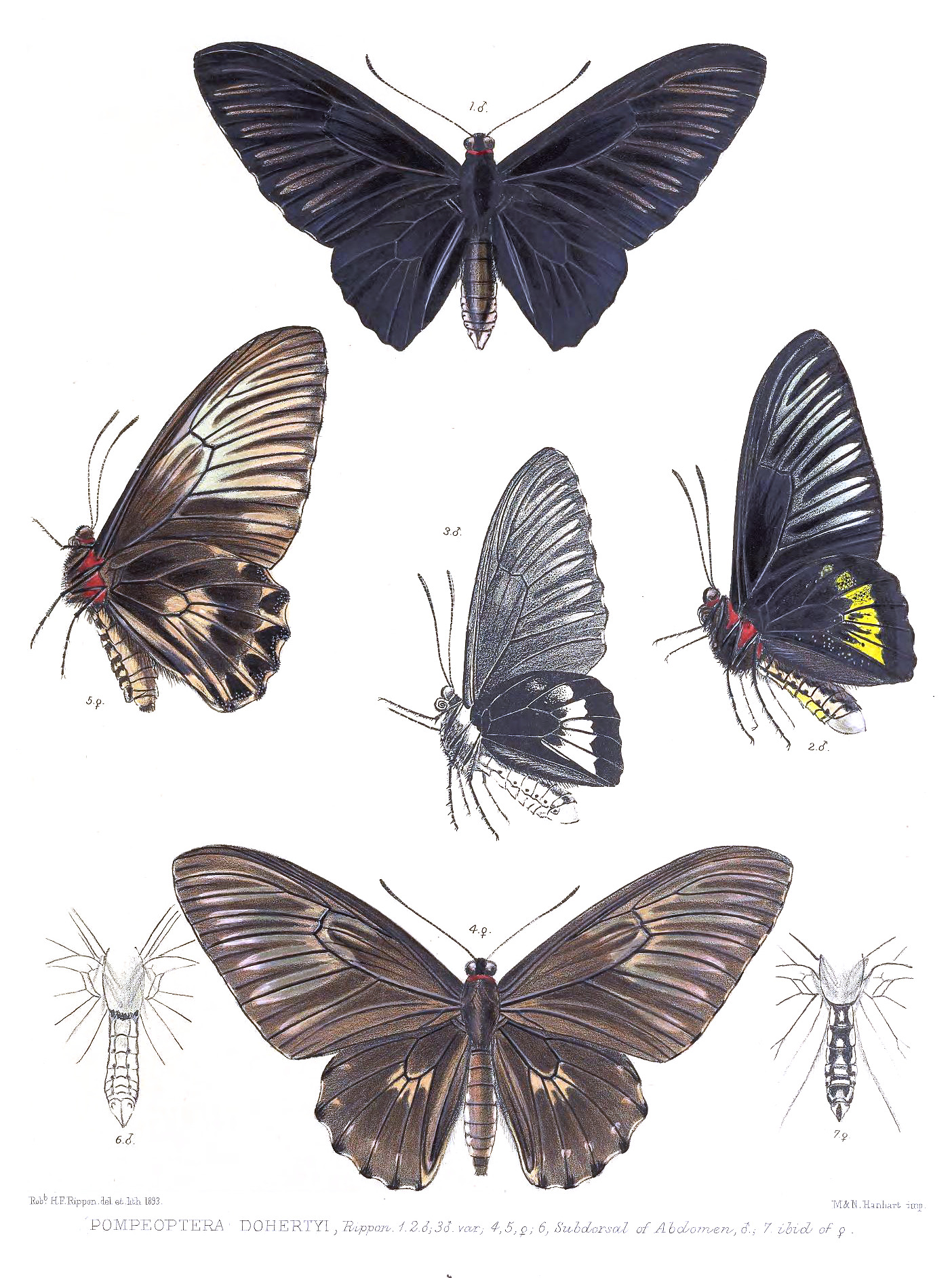

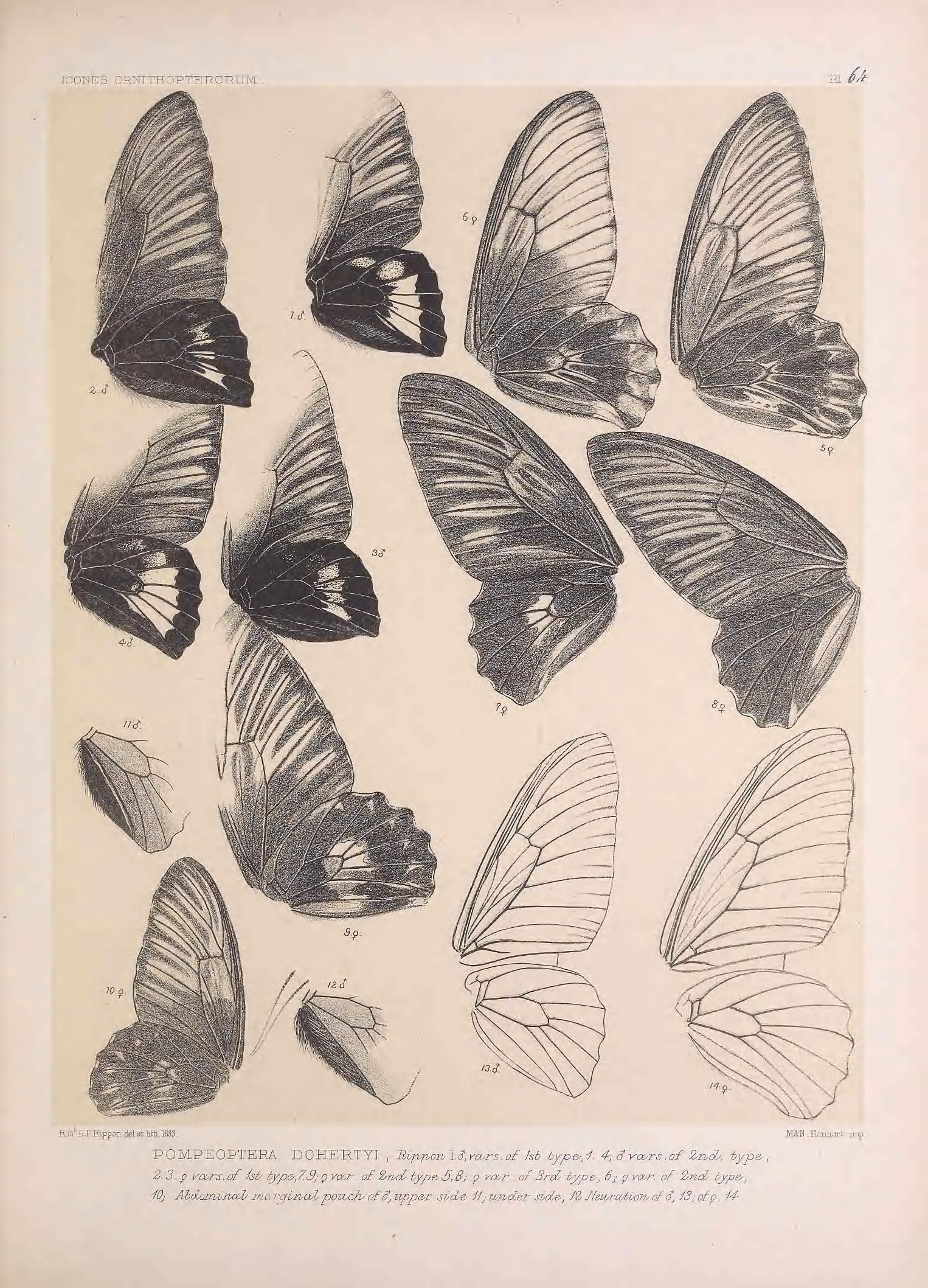

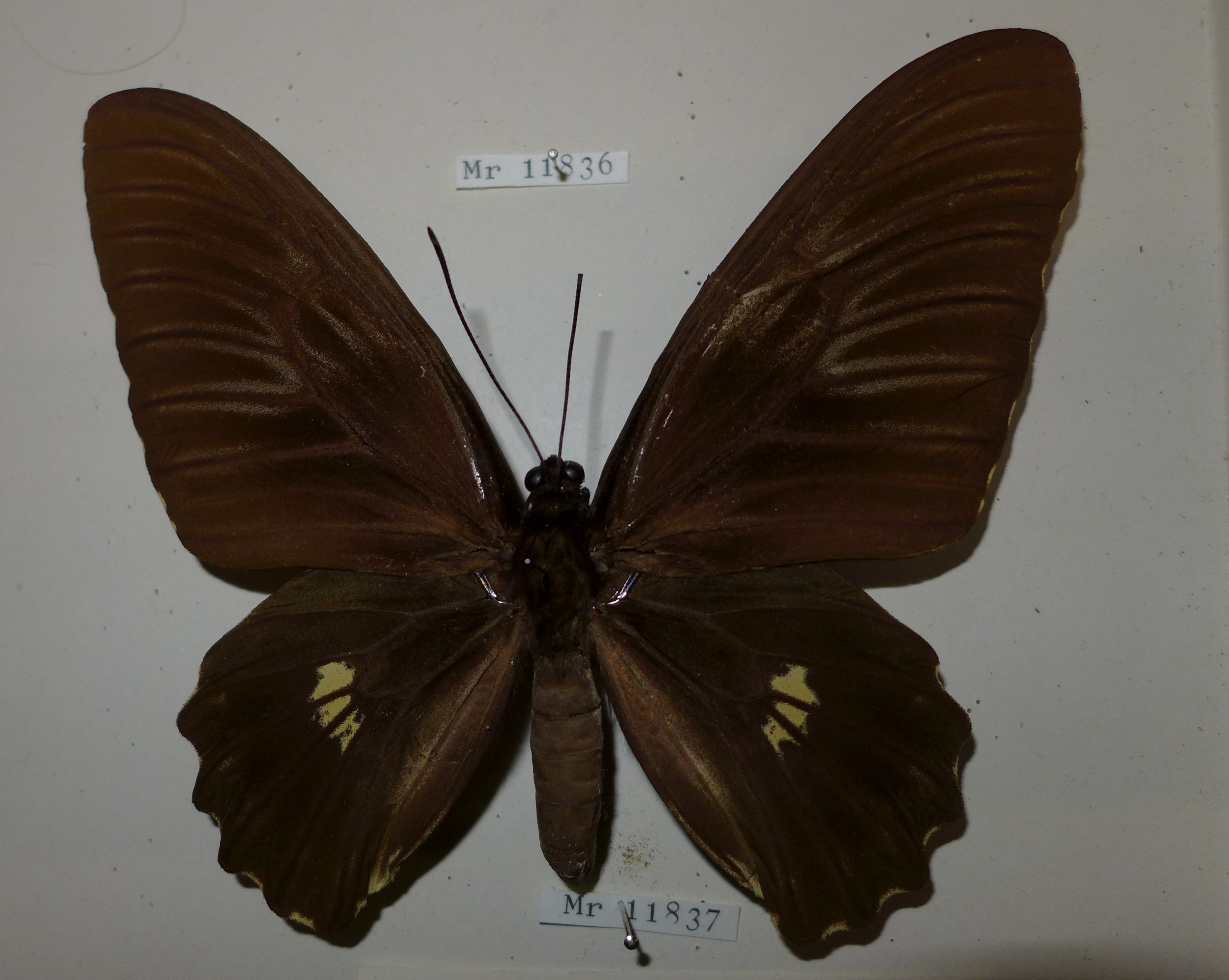

== Related species ==
Troides dohertyi is a member of the Troides aeacus species group. The members of this clade are:

- Troides aeacus C. & R. Felder, 1860
- Troides magellanus (C. & R. Felder, 1862)
- Troides minos (Cramer, [1779])
- Troides rhadamantus (Lucas, 1835)
- Troides dohertyi (Rippon, 1893)
- Troides prattorum (Joicey & Talbot, 1922)

== Conservation ==
Troides dohertyi is classified as vulnerable on the IUCN Red List 2006 (1) and listed on Appendix II of CITES (2).

== Etymology ==
It was named by Robert Henry Fernando Rippon, for William Doherty.
