= Ripon Cricket Club =

Sports club in North Yorkshire, England

Ripon Cricket Club is an English cricket club side based in the medieval city of Ripon, North Yorkshire. It was formed in 1810. The club now plays in the York & District Senior Cricket League.

== History ==
Ripon Cricket Club is one of the oldest clubs in Yorkshire and boasts of its rich heritage. It has played host to a number of renowned touring sides and the club's Studley Road ground is used frequently by the Yorkshire Second XI for their home fixtures.

=== Famous Players ===
Ripon boasts of many players who have gone on to play cricket at the highest standard including the current club president Peter Squires; who played first class cricket for Yorkshire County Cricket Club as well as representing England twenty nine times in Rugby Union, scoring six tries.

=== Popularity ===
The club fields three senior teams, a 1st XI, who play in the York & District Senior League, a 2nd XI & 3rd XI who play in the Nidderdale League. It also has an evening league side who play in the Harrogate and District Evening League.

The club also fields a strong junior setup featuring four junior teams. It also provides coaching for both boys and girls from age seven.
