= Ripon College =

Ripon College may refer to:

- Ripon College (Wisconsin), a liberal arts college in Ripon, Wisconsin, United States
- The former name of Outwood Academy Ripon, a school in North Yorkshire, England
- Ripon College Cuddesdon, a theological college in Oxfordshire, England
- Ripon College, Calcutta, the former name of Surendranath College, an undergraduate college in Kolkata, India, that is affiliated to the University of Calcutta
- Ripon College of Education, a former teacher training college in North Yorkshire, England, now part of York St John University

== See also ==
- Rippon College
