= HMS Rippon =

Three ships of the Royal Navy have borne the name HMS Rippon, an archaic version of Ripon, a city in North Yorkshire. A fourth has been named HMS Ripon:

- HMS Rippon (1712) was a 64-gun third rate launched in 1712, rebuilt in 1735 as a 60-gun fourth rate and broken up in 1751.
- HMS Rippon (1758) was a 60-gun fourth rate launched in 1758, reduced to harbour service in 1801 and broken up in 1808.
- HMS Rippon (1812) was a 74-gun third rate launched in 1812 and broken up in 1821.
- HMS Ripon (1945) was an aircraft transport launched in 1945 and sold in 1959.

== See also ==
- HMS Rippon's Prize
