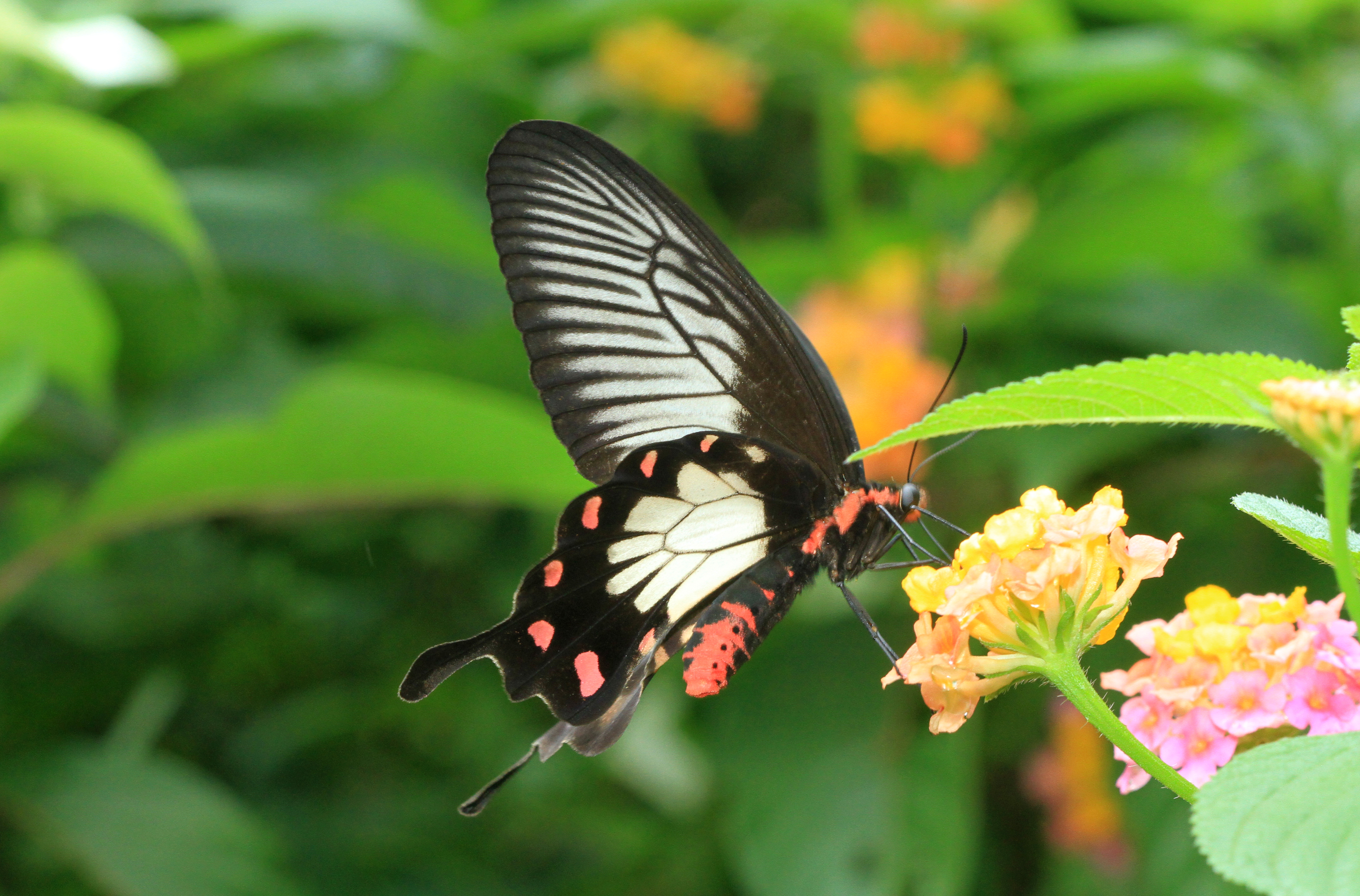

Conservation status
- CITES Appendix II (CITES)

Scientific classification
- Kingdom: Animalia
- Phylum: Arthropoda
- Class: Insecta
- Order: Lepidoptera
- Family: Papilionidae
- Genus: Pachliopta
- Species: P. pandiyana

Binomial name
- Pachliopta pandiyana (Moore, 1881)
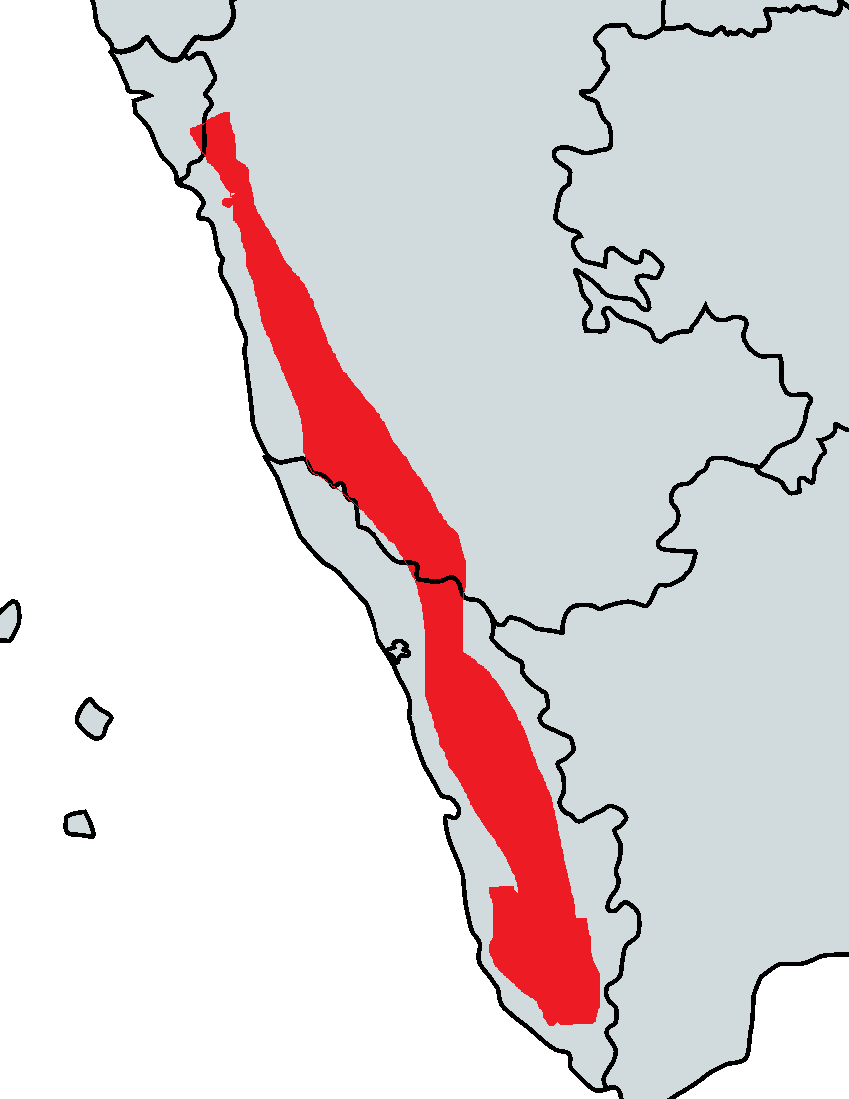

Synonyms
- Atrophaneura pandiyana

= Pachliopta pandiyana =

Malabar rose

Species of butterfly

Pachliopta pandiyana, the Malabar rose is a swallowtail butterfly belonging to the genus Pachliopta, the roses or red-bodied swallowtails.

It is an important endemic butterfly of south India.

== Description ==
This was earlier considered a race of Pachliopta jophon found in Sri Lanka.

Race pandiyanus, Moore. "Though closely allied to A. jophon gray, this species is constantly different in pattern. The white colour of the forewings is much more extended, especially in the apical region, but also more shaded with black scales; the internervular black streaks between the median nervures (veins 4-6) are much longer, the white linear markings, in the cell reach the discocellular veinlets. On the hindwing the last discal white spot reaches mostly to the submedian nervure (vein 1), the anterior one is very large in the male, small or divided into two spots, or obliterated in the female...". (Rothschild, quoted in Bingham)

== Similar species ==
It resembles the common rose (Pachliopta aristolochiae) from which it can be differentiated by the much larger white patch on its hindwings.

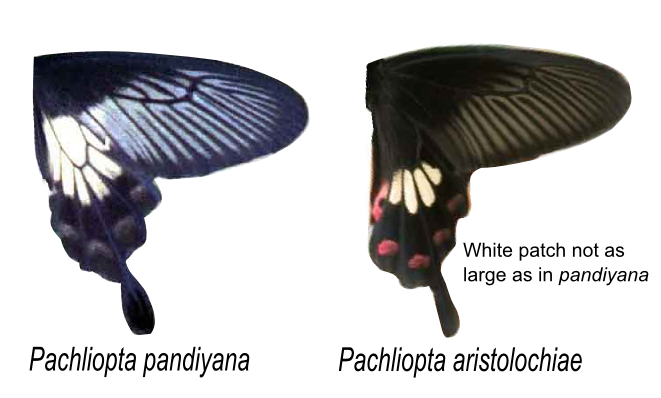

== Range ==
Southern India. The butterfly does not associate much with the common rose, which it resembles. On the western slopes of the Nilgiris and elsewhere on the Western Ghats, the Malabar rose entirely displaces that most abundant butterfly.

== Status ==
It is uncommon, but not considered to be threatened as a species. The species is locally common in the Western Ghats.

== Taxonomy ==
A related species, Pachliopta jophon, once considered conspecific, flies in Sri Lanka. No separate subspecies have been described.

== Habitat ==
This butterfly is confined to the wet jungles of southern India and the Western Ghats, between 1,000 and 3,000 feet (300 and 910 m).

== Habits ==
The flight of this butterfly resembles that of the common rose (Pachliopta aristolochiae). Early in the morning till about 10 am, it keeps low and feeds from flowers, usually those of the Lantana. Later in the day it flies high and is difficult to capture.

== Life cycle ==
Appears to be single-brooded and is most common in September and October.

== Food plants ==
The larval food plant is Thottea siliquosa (Aristolochiaceae).

== See also ==
- Papilionidae
- List of butterflies of India
- List of butterflies of India (Papilionidae)
