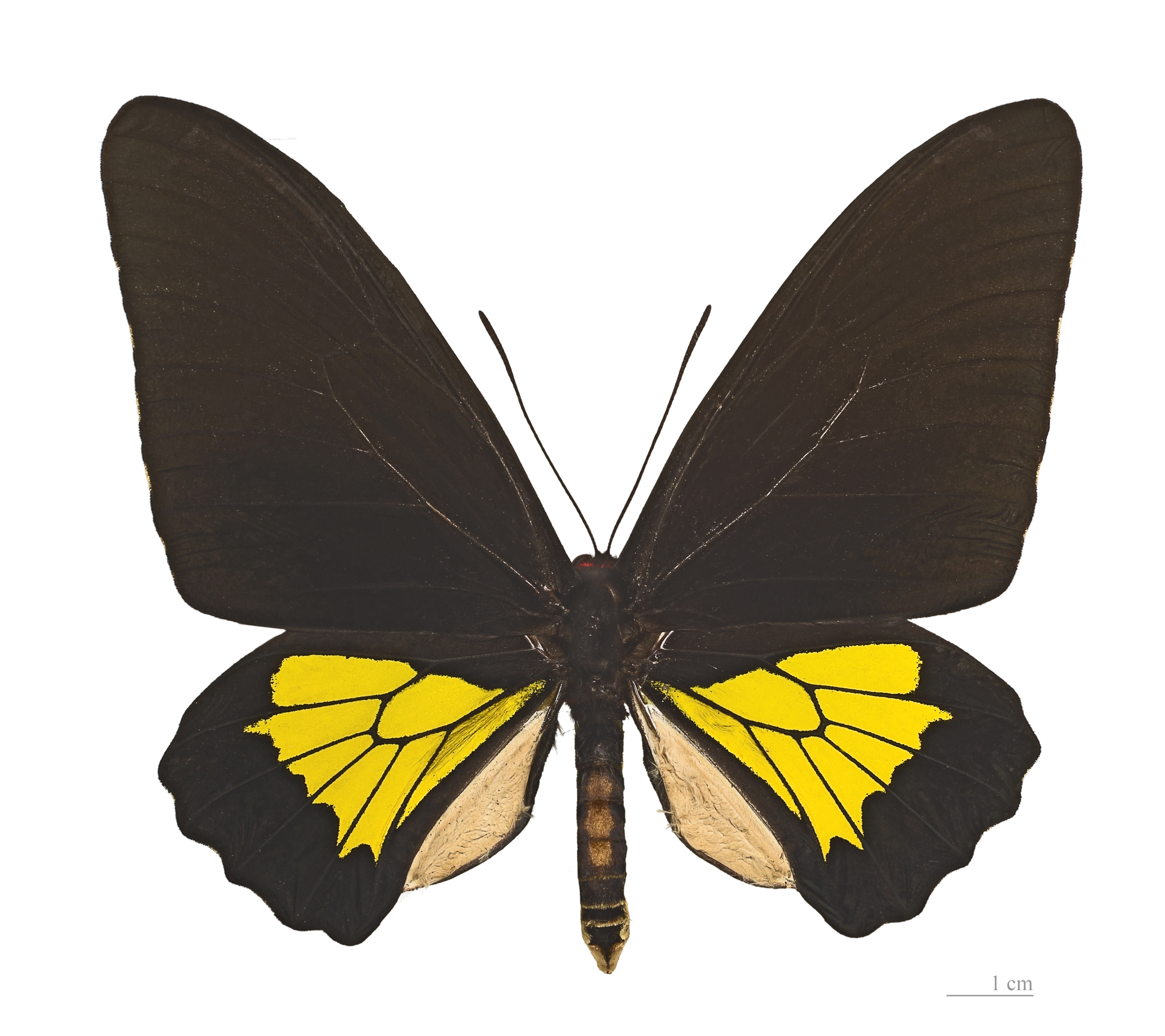
- T. o. papuensis, male from Morobe Province, Papua New Guinea

Conservation status
- CITES Appendix II

Scientific classification
- Kingdom: Animalia
- Phylum: Arthropoda
- Clade: Pancrustacea
- Class: Insecta
- Order: Lepidoptera
- Family: Papilionidae
- Genus: Troides
- Species: T. oblongomaculatus

Binomial name
- Troides oblongomaculatus (Goeze, 1779)

= Troides oblongomaculatus =

Oblong-spotted birdwing

Species of butterfly

Troides oblongomaculatus, the oblong-spotted birdwing, is a birdwing butterfly found in Indonesia and New Guinea.

T. oblongomaculatus is the only Troides species found as far east as New Guinea. It has been assumed that the species originated in the Moluccas and later penetrated into Melanesia. It is a common species, the larva of which feed on Aristolochia tagala.

== Subspecies ==
Nine subspecies are recognized. These are:

- T. o. oblongomaculatus (Goeze, 1779) from Seram, Ambon, Saparua, Haruku, Seram Laut, Geser, Nusa Laut, Nusa Is.
- T. o. thestius (Staudinger, 1896) from Salaya Is.
- T. o. bouruensis (Wallace, 1865) from Buru Is., Sula Mangole
- T. o. asartia (Rothschild, 1908) from Seram Laut Is.
- T. o. bandensis Pagenstecher, 1904 from Banda Islands
- T. o. hanno Fruhstorfer, 1904 from Gorong Is., Watubela Is., Kasiui Is., Tiffoor
- T. o. papuensis (Wallace, 1865) from New Guinea
- T. o. ilonae Schäffler, 1999 from Yapen Is.
- T. o. cyclop Rumbucher & Schäffler, 2005 from Manipa Is., Kelang Is.
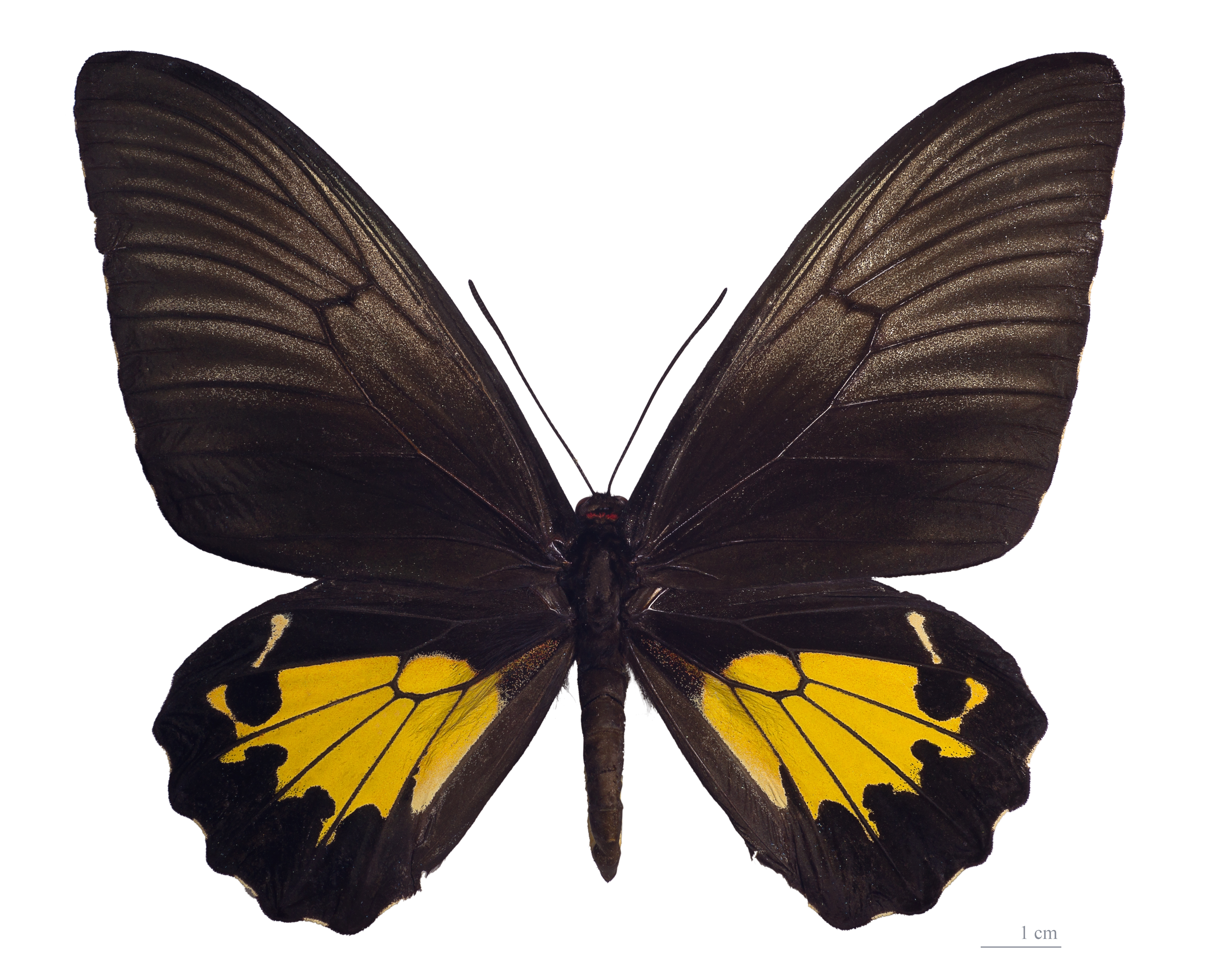
Museum specimen, female, dorsal side

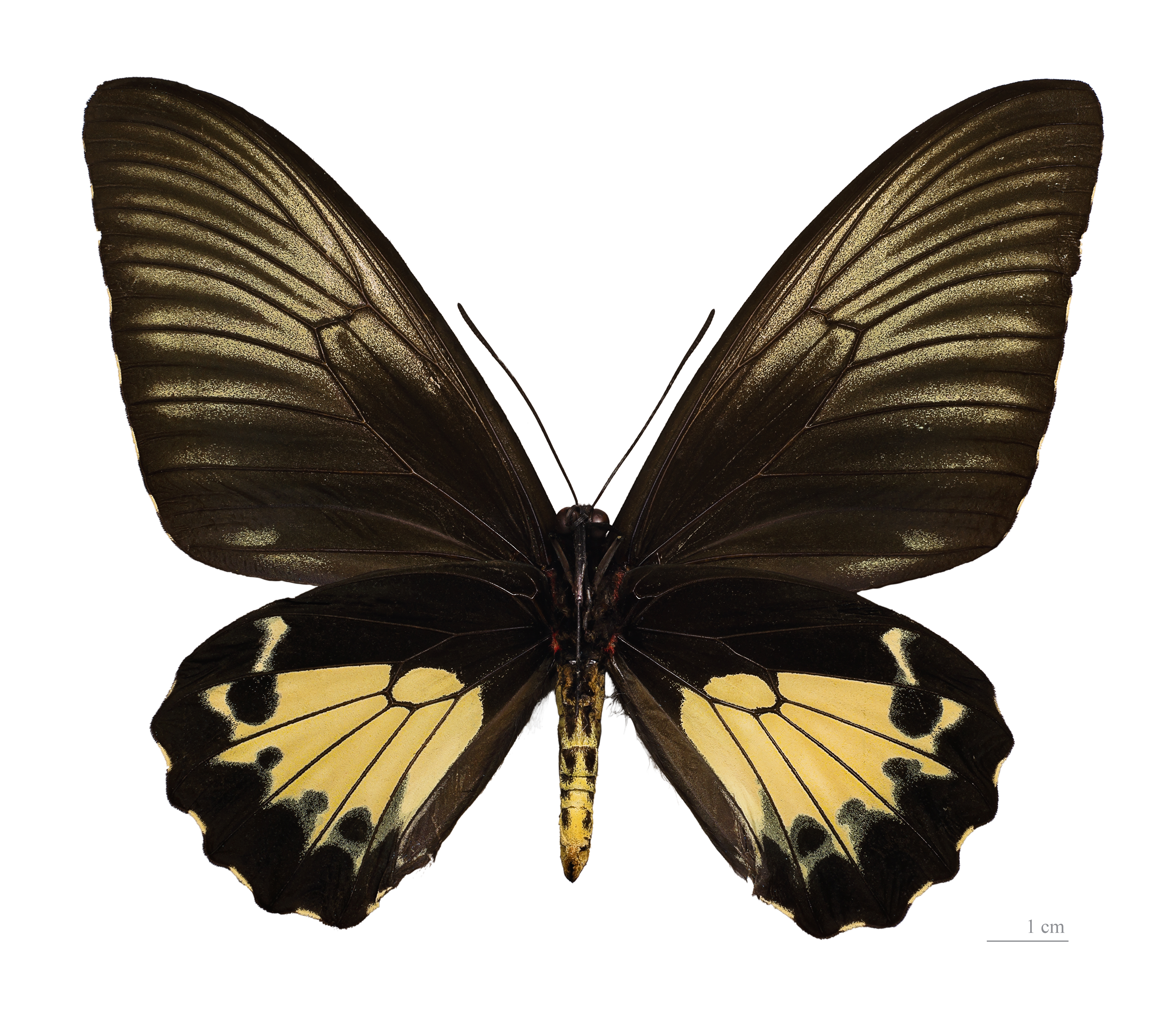
Museum specimen, female, ventral side

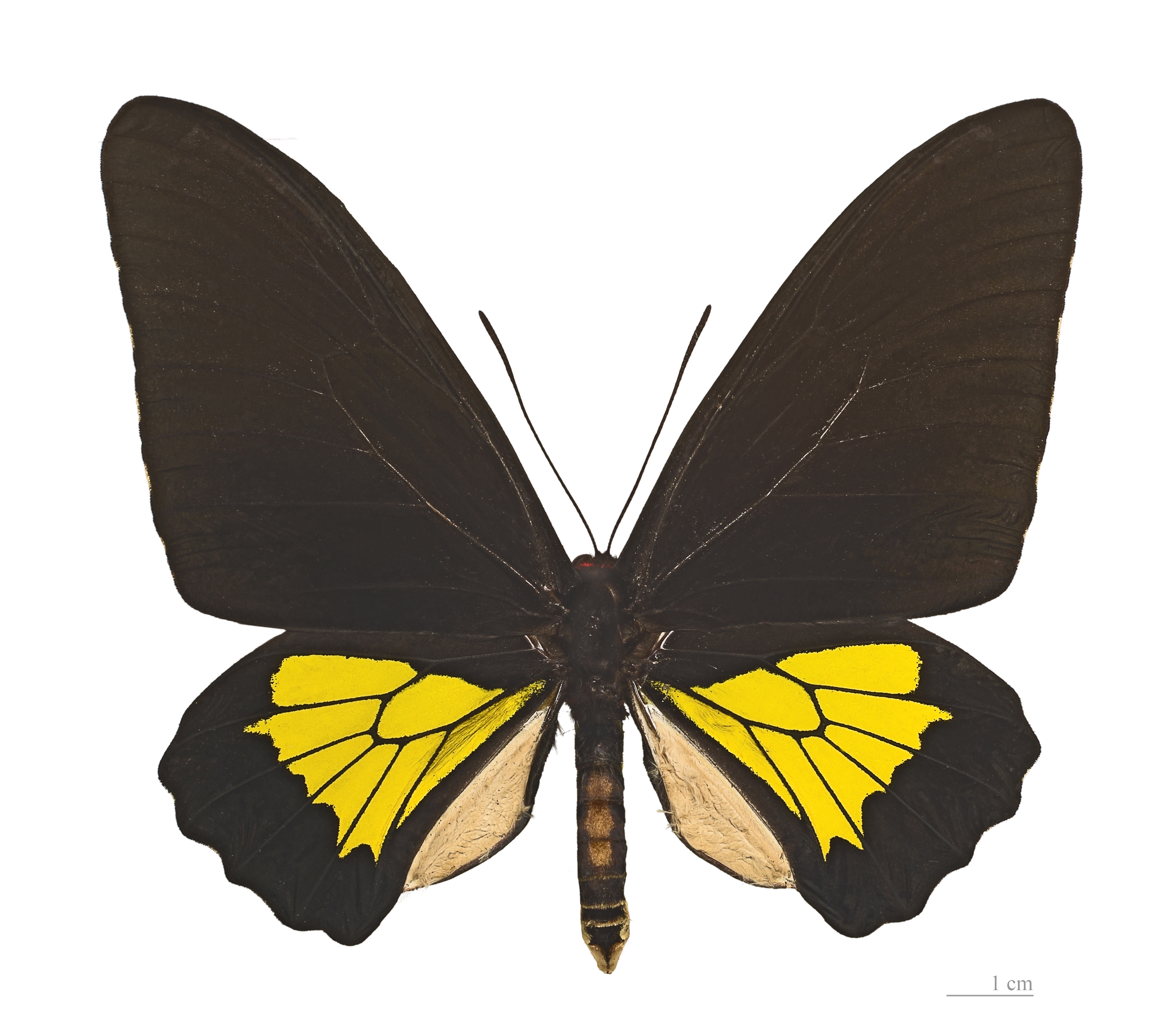
Museum specimen, male, dorsal side

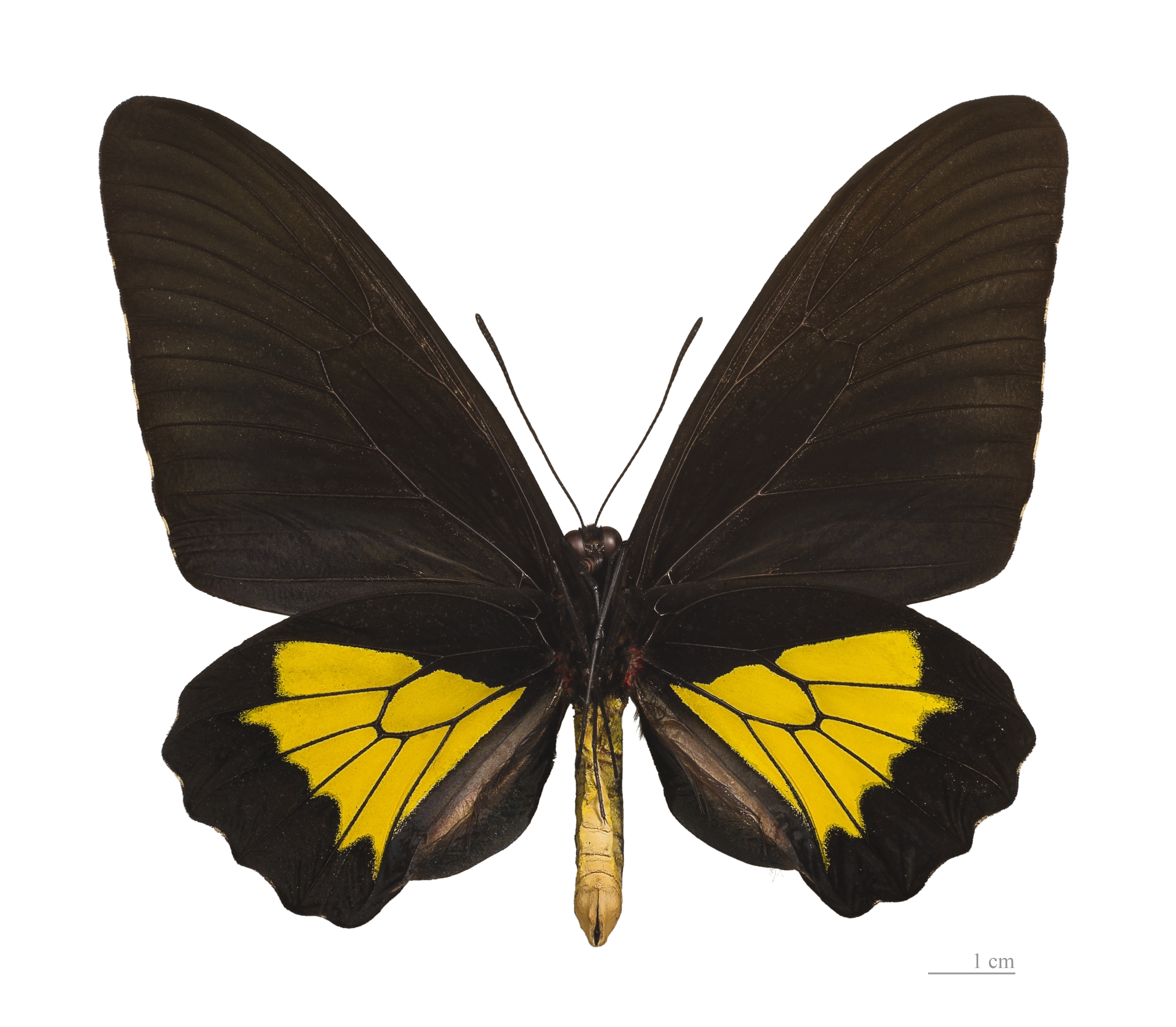
Museum specimen, male, ventral side

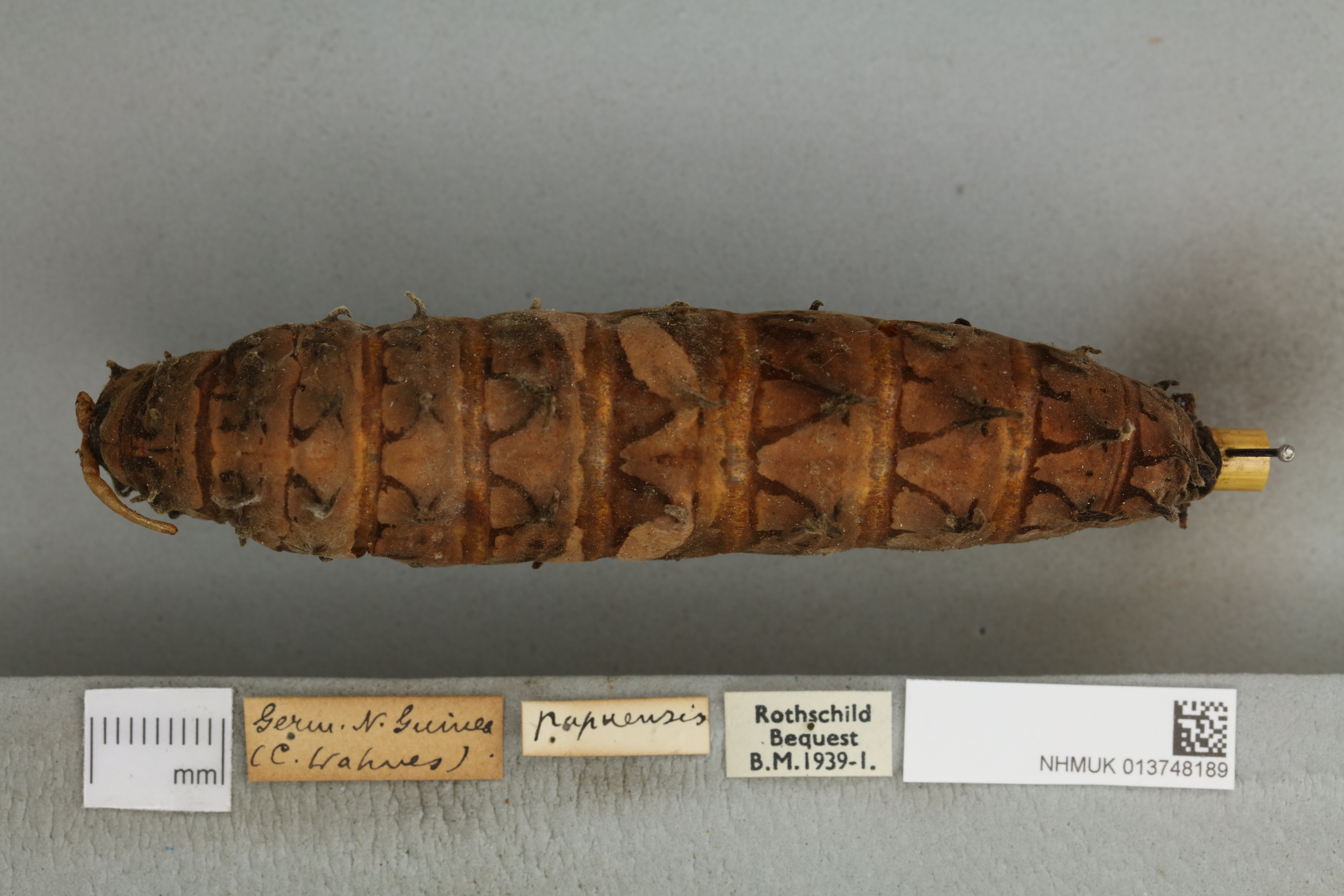
Troides oblongomaculatus papuensis larva, dorsal view

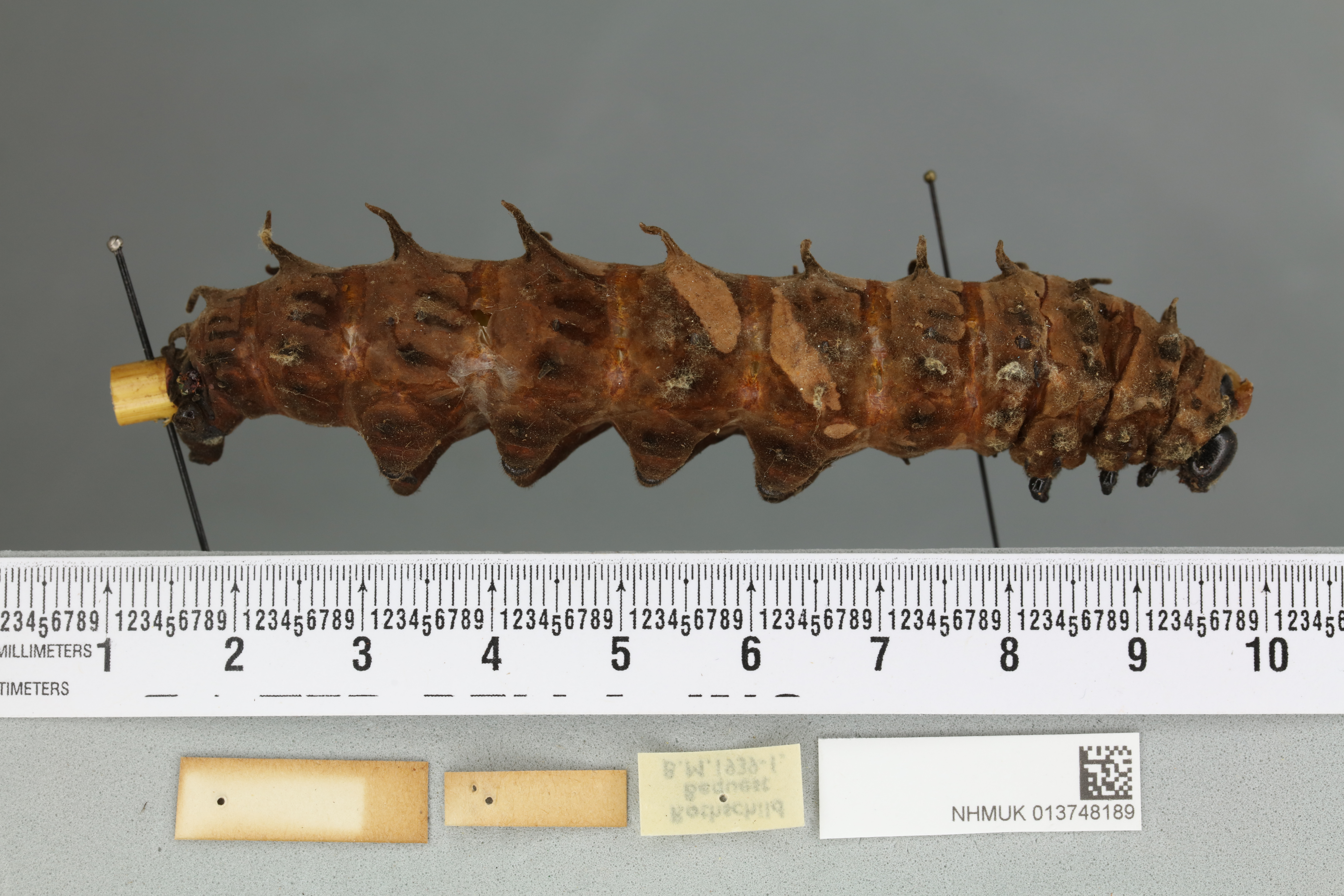
Troides oblongomaculatus papuensis larva, lateral view

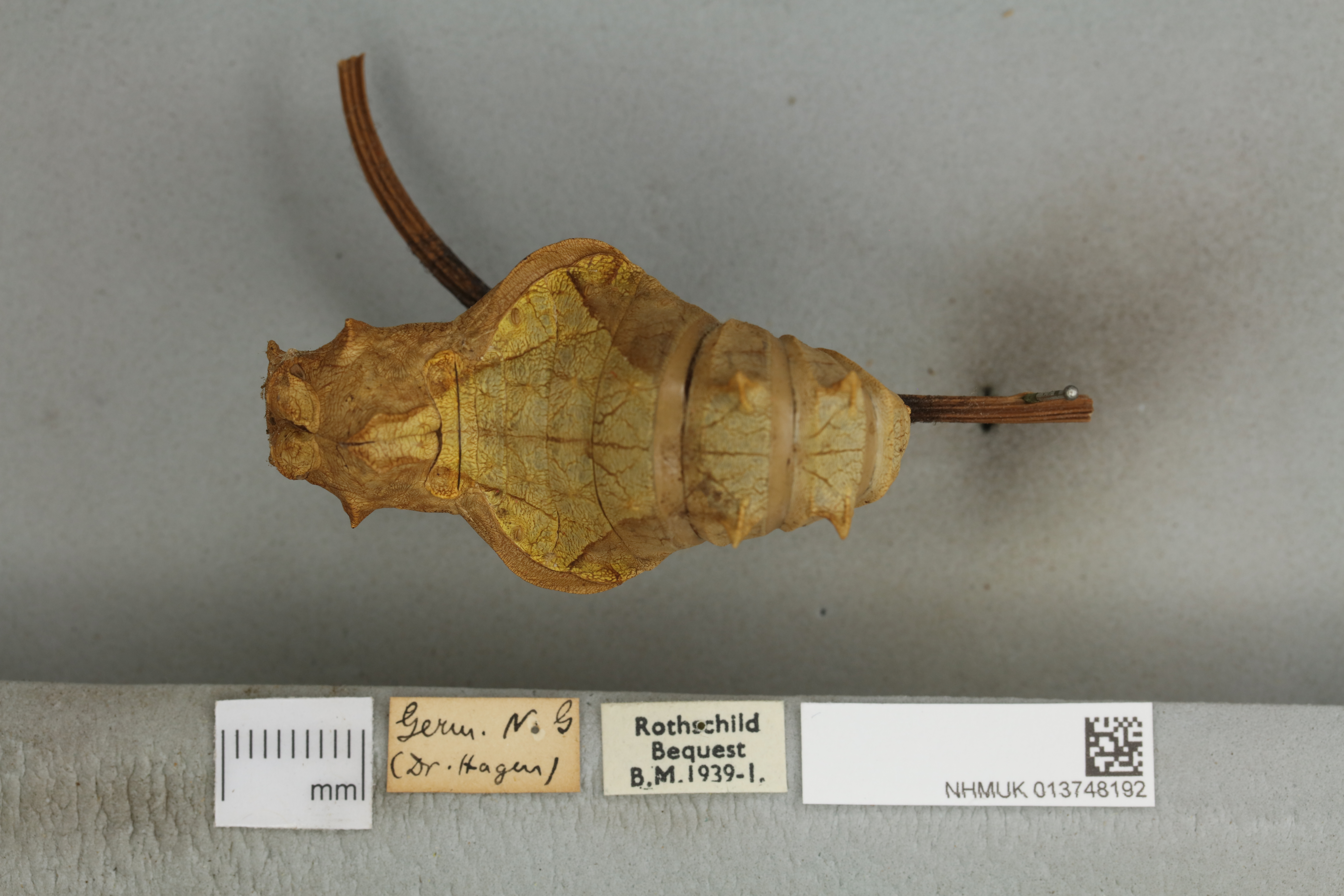
Troides oblongomaculatus papuensis pupa, dorsal view

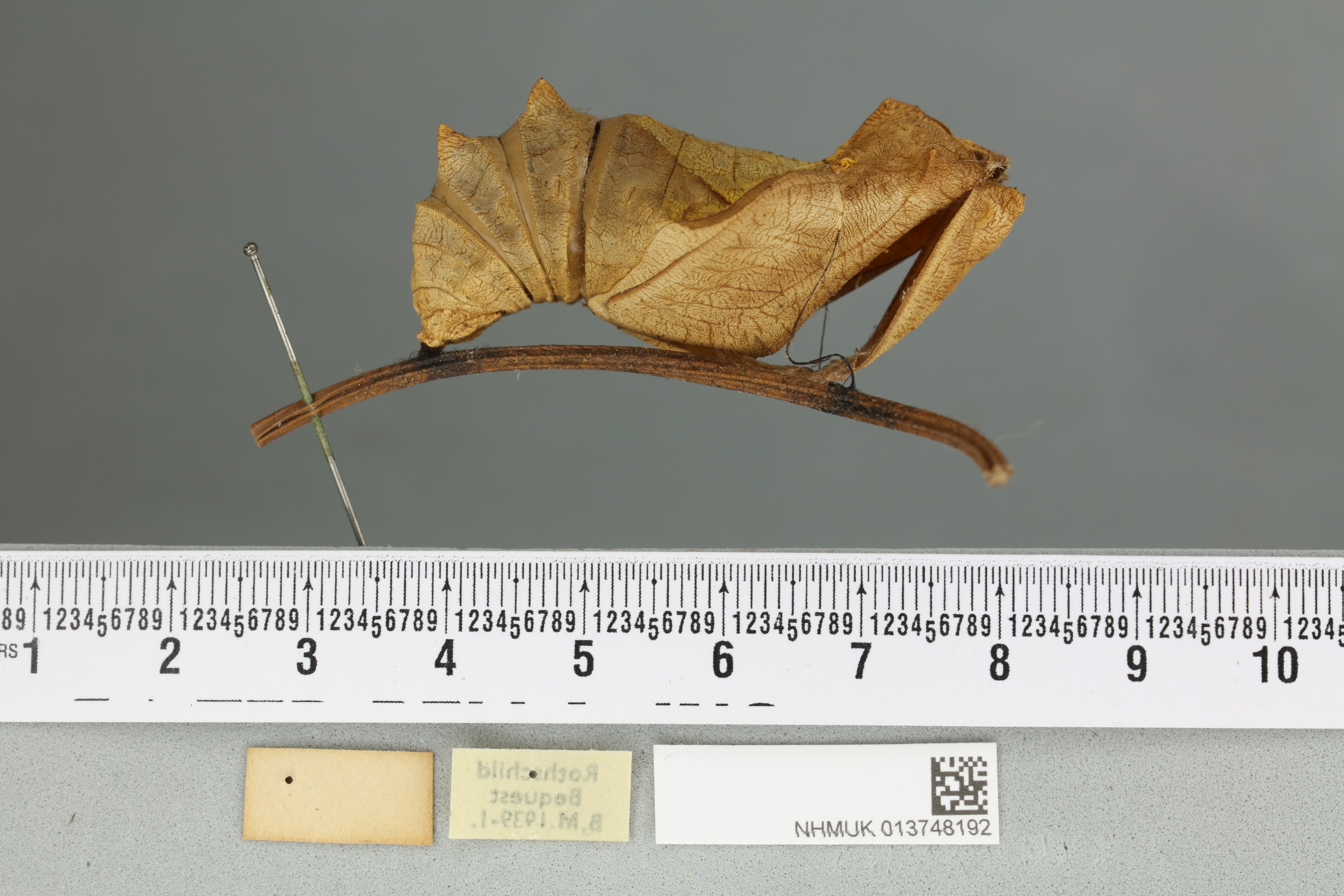
Troides oblongomaculatus papuensis pupa, lateral view

== Related species ==
Troides oblongomaculatus is a member of the Troides helena species group. The members of this clade are:

- Troides helena (Linnaeus, 1758)
- Troides oblongomaculatus (Goeze, 1779)
- Troides × celebensis (Wallace, 1865)
