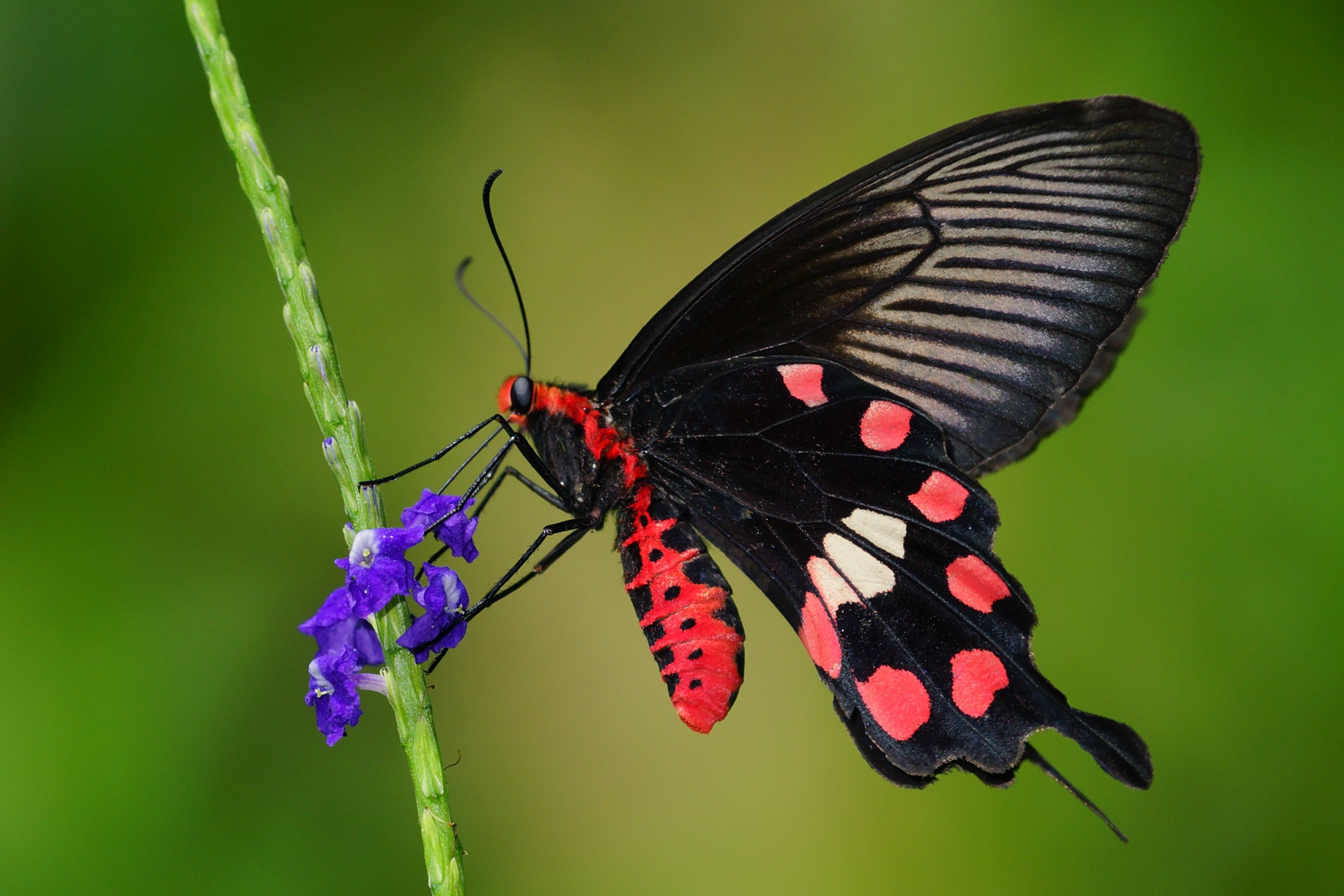

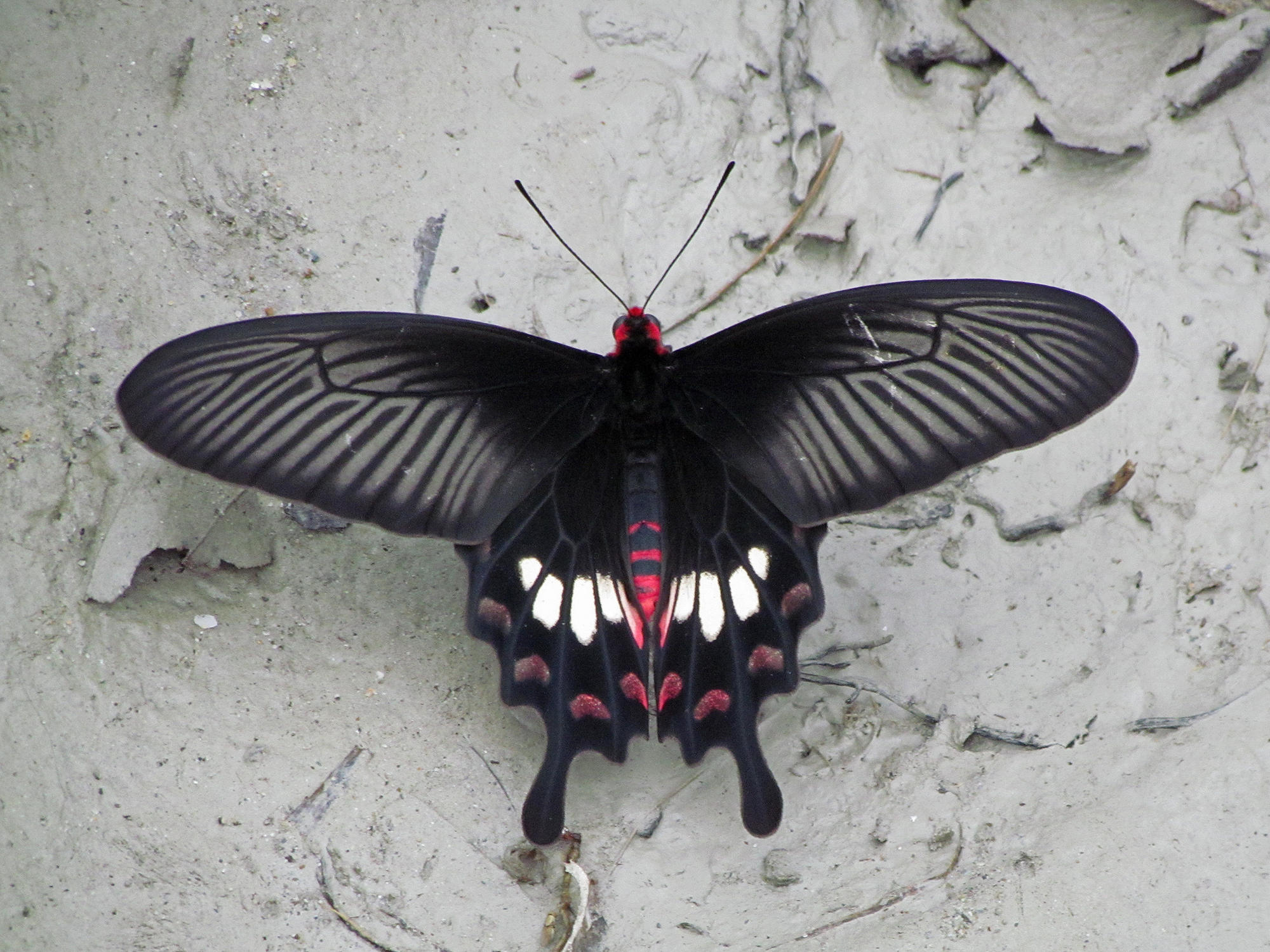
- P. a. aristolochiae West Bengal, India

Scientific classification
- Kingdom: Animalia
- Phylum: Arthropoda
- Clade: Pancrustacea
- Class: Insecta
- Order: Lepidoptera
- Family: Papilionidae
- Genus: Pachliopta
- Species: P. aristolochiae

Binomial name
- Pachliopta aristolochiae (Fabricius, 1775)

Synonyms
- Atrophaneura aristolochiae

= Pachliopta aristolochiae =

Common rose

Species of butterfly

Pachliopta aristolochiae, the common rose, is a species of swallowtail butterfly belonging to the genus Pachliopta, the roses, or red-bodied swallowtails. It is a common butterfly which is extensively distributed across south and southeast Asia.

== Range ==
It is widely distributed in Asia including Afghanistan, Pakistan, India (including the Andaman Islands), Nepal, Sri Lanka, Myanmar, Thailand, Japan (south-western Okinawa only), Laos, Vietnam, Cambodia, Nicobar Islands, peninsular and eastern Malaysia, Brunei, Philippines (Palawan and Leyte), Indonesia, Bangladesh and Taiwan.

In China, it is distributed in southern and eastern China (including Hainan, Guangdong province) and Hong Kong. In Indonesia, it is distributed in Sumatra, Nias, Enggano, Bangka, Java, Bali, Kangean, Lombok, Sumbawa, Sumba, Flores, Tanahjampea, and Kalimantan.

== Status ==
It is very common almost all over the plains of India, and is not threatened as a species. During and after the monsoon it is extremely abundant.

== Description ==
The upperside of male is velvety black.

Forewing with well-marked pale adnervular streaks on the discal area that do not reach the terminal margin, the latter broadly velvety black; the streaks beyond end of cell extended inwards into its apex.

Hindwing with elongate white discal markings in interspaces 2–5 beyond the cell.

In dry-weather specimens these markings are very short and do not nearly reach the bases of the interspaces; beyond these a curved series of subterminal lunular markings in interspaces one to seven dull crimson irrorated with black scales, the spot in interspace one large, irregular, diffuse, margined interiorly with white.

On the underside of the males, the ground colour and markings is similar, but the red subterminal spots on the hindwing much brighter; it is not irrorated with black scales, better defined, the anterior four subquadrate, the next two crescent shaped, sometimes quadrate also, the spot in interspace one triangular and pointed. Antennae, thorax and abdomen above up to the pre-anal segment black; the head, sides of prothorax above, and of the whole of the thorax and abdomen beneath vermilion red; anal segment vermilion red.

Females are similar to the males; they differ from the male only in the comparatively broader wings and this is most conspicuous in the forewing.

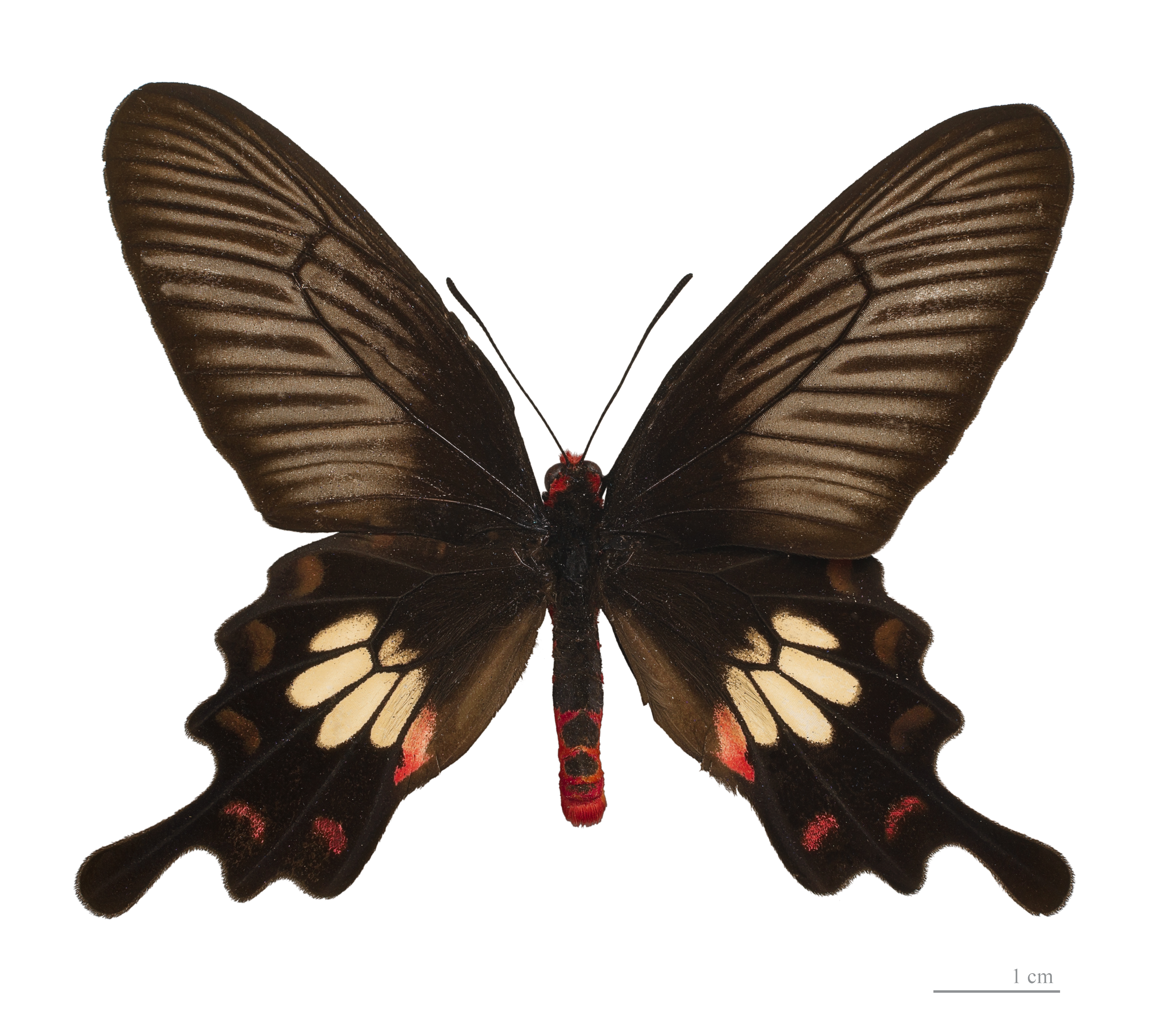
Male, dorsal side
(museum specimen)

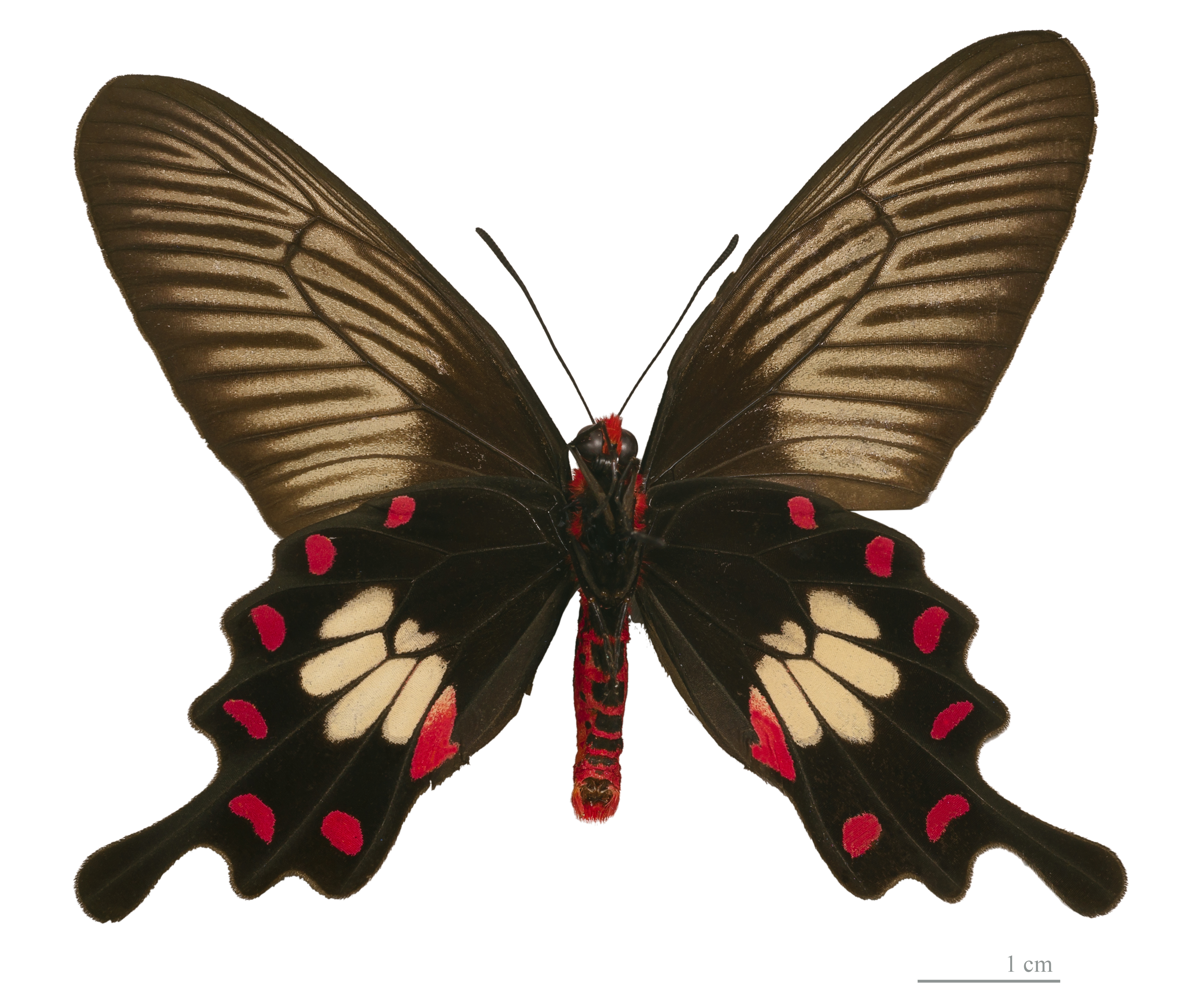
Female, ventral side
(museum specimen)

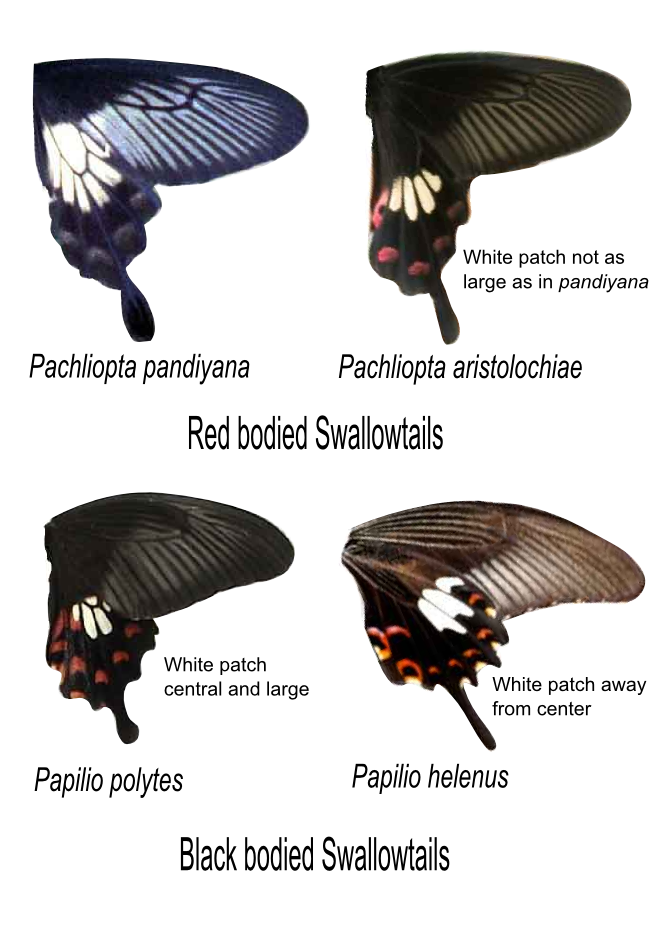
Similar species
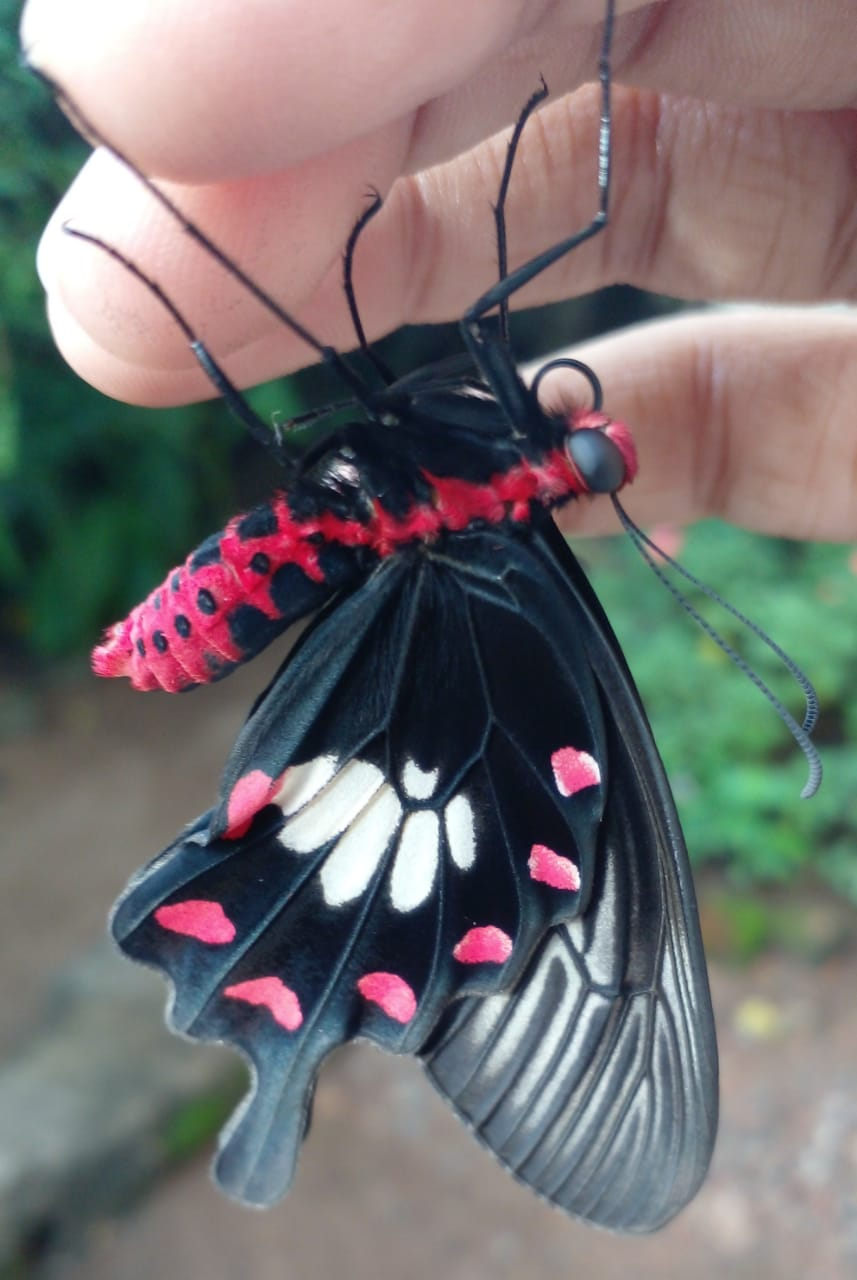
Male

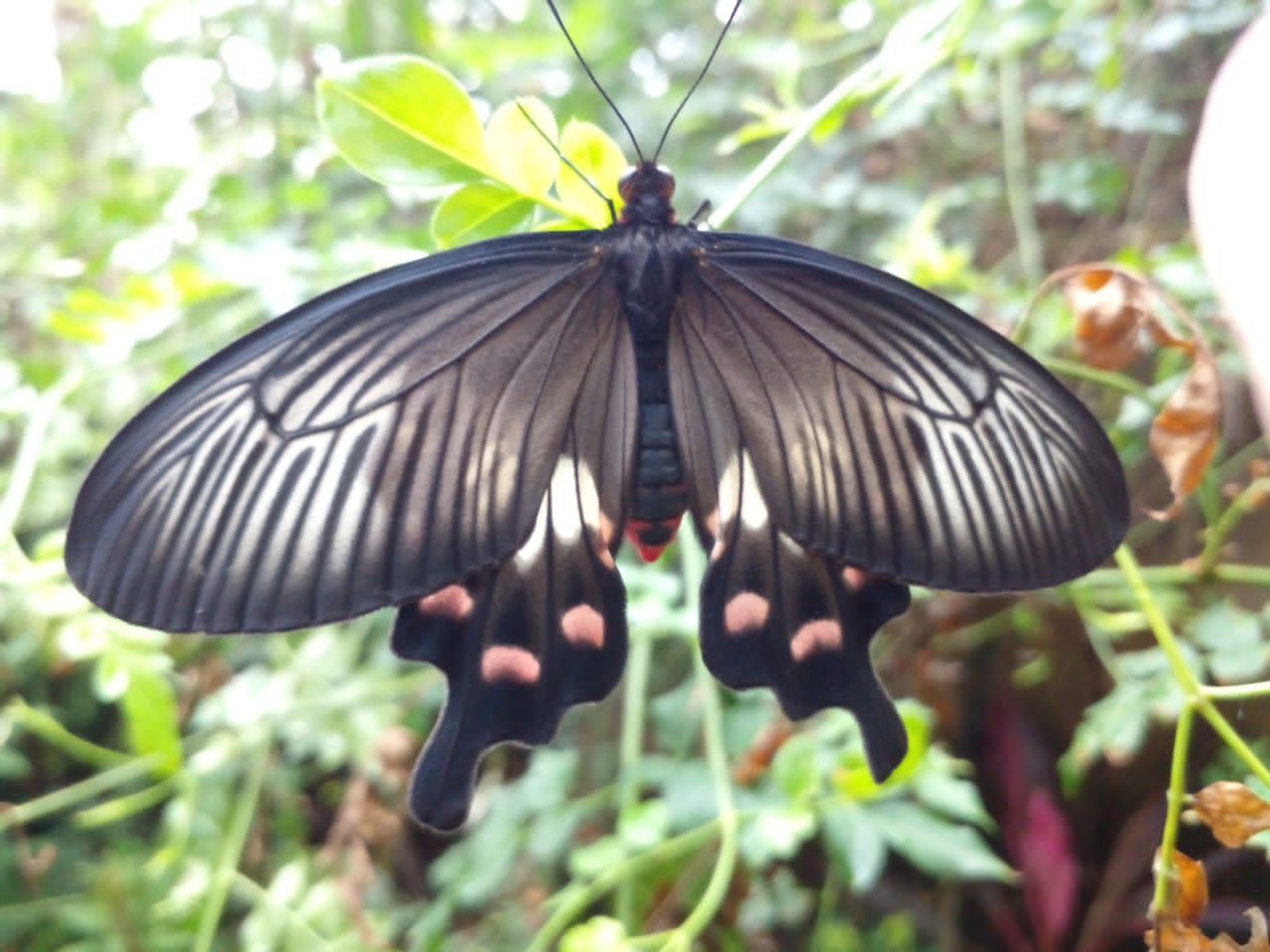
Male

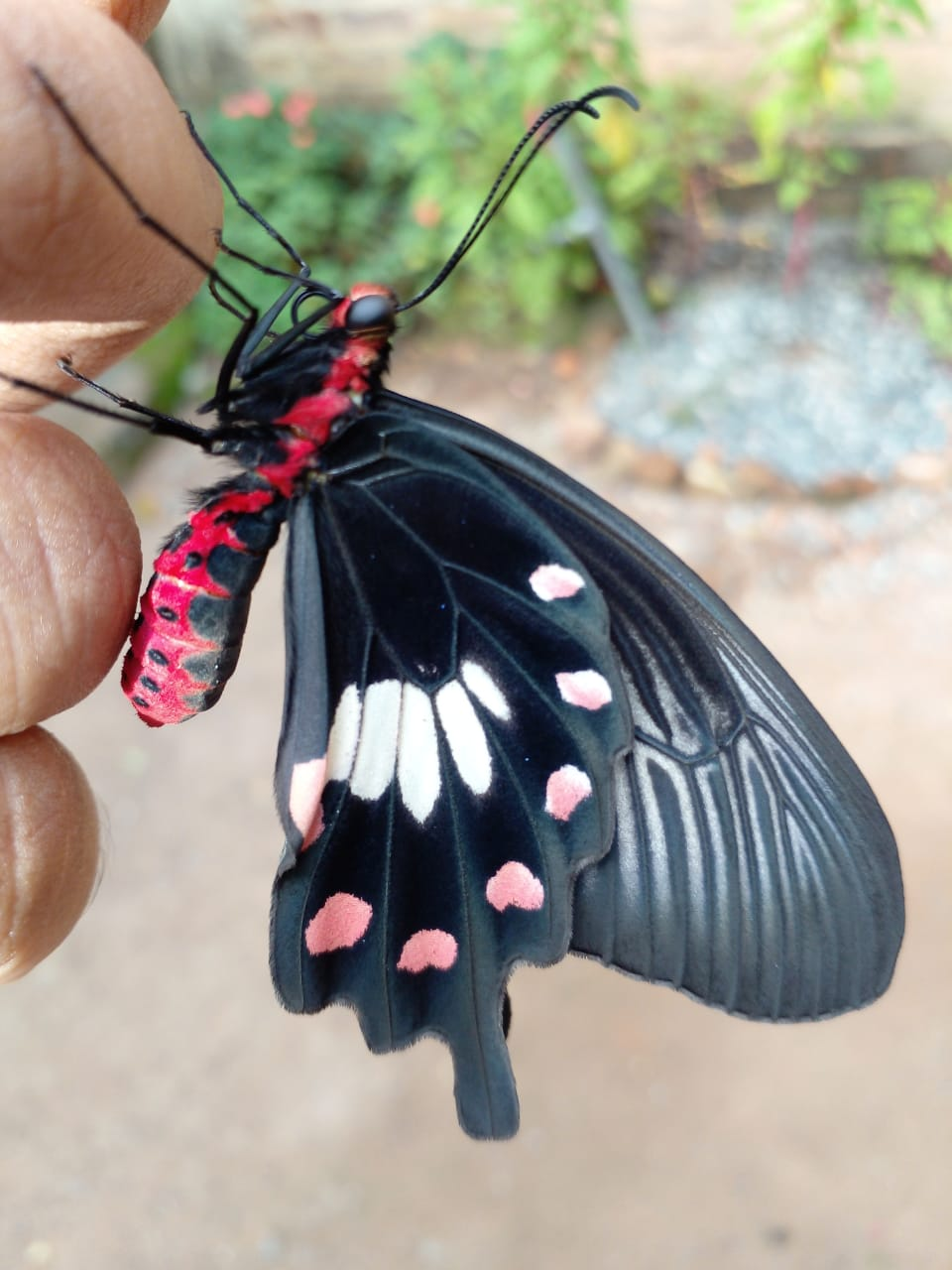
Female

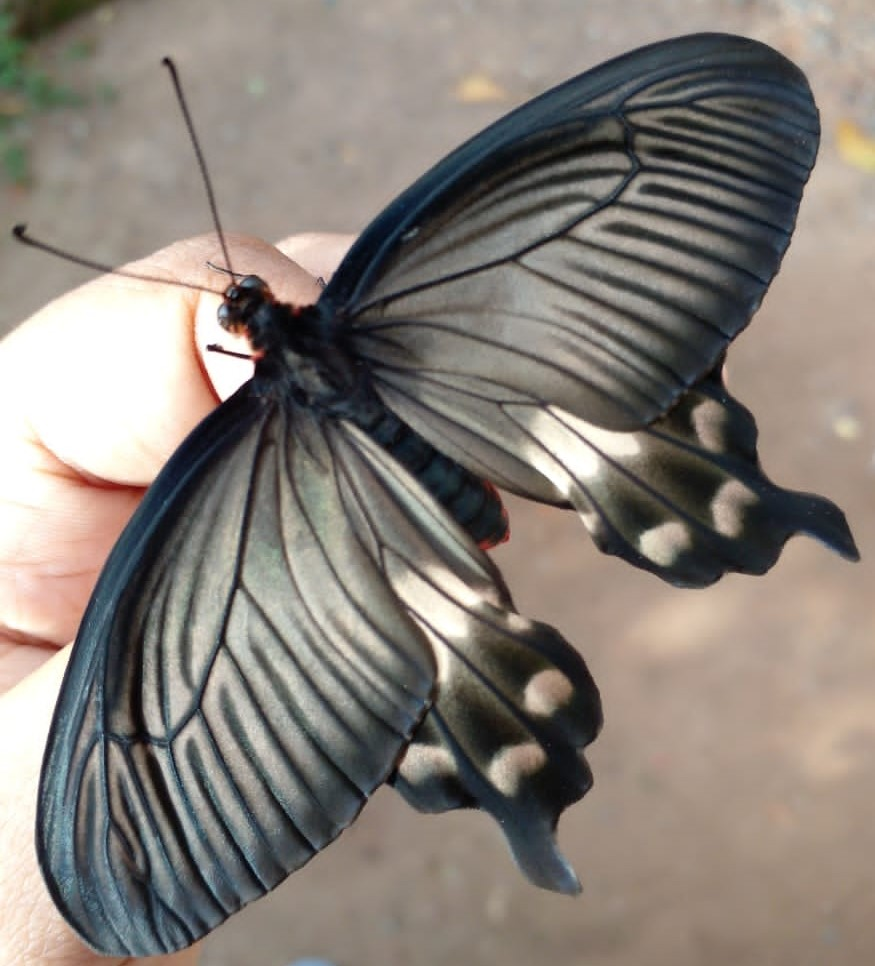
Female

== Varieties ==
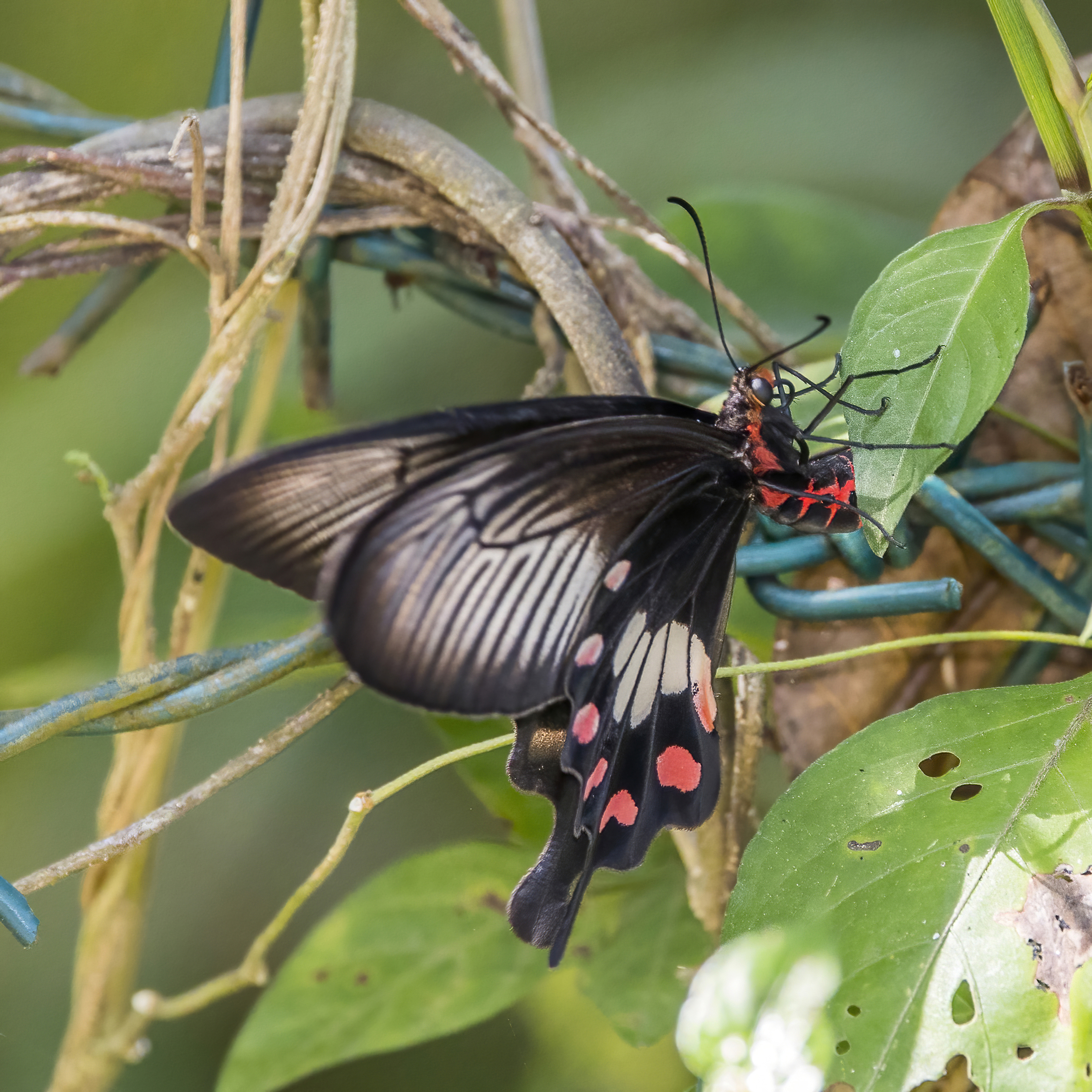
P. a. ceylonica, Sri Lanka

There are up to 20 subspecies. The nominate sub-species occurs throughout peninsular India. The subspecies include:

- P. a. aristolochiae Fabricius. India. Very common.
- P. a. sawi Evans. Car Nicobar. Not rare.
- P. a. camorta Moore. Central Nicobars. Not rare.
- P. a. goniopeltis Walter Rothschild. Andaman Islands. Not rare. Also found in Myanmar.
- P. a. kondulana Evans. South Nicobars. Not rare.

The subspecies P. a. ceylonicus Moore is found in Sri Lanka and is very common.

Variety camorta differs from the typical form as follows:

- "The white spots of the hindwing small, only that between the lower median veins (veins 2 and 3) is clearly marked on the upperside
- the two others standing before and behind the upper median vein (vein 4) are sometimes entirely absent from the upperside, or when present are much suffused with black; below there is usually a spot within the apex of the cell." (Rothschild quoted in Bingham)

== Habitat ==
An excellent generalist which has adapted to a range of habitats, the butterfly has been found in congregations at lower elevations. The common rose is found up to 2,400 metres (8,000 ft) in the Western Ghats and south Indian hills, up to 1,500 metres (5,000 ft) at the eastern end of the Himalayas but only up to 910 metres (3,000 ft) in the north-west Himalayas. The butterfly is a common visitor to Indian gardens and can even be found in crowded urban areas.

== Habits ==
It is the commonest of the large-tailed butterflies of India.

The red body, slow peculiar flight, bright colouration and pattern of the wings are meant to indicate to predators that this butterfly is inedible, being well protected by the poisons it has sequestered from its larval food plant. It also emits a nasty smelling substance when handled to further enhance its unappealing qualities. Hence it is rarely attacked by predators, a strategy so successful, that edible butterflies have evolved to mimic it, the classic example being that of the female morph of the common Mormon that is Papilio polytes, female form stichius.

The common rose frequently visits flowers such as Lantana, Cosmos, Zinnia, Jatropha and Clerodendron. The butterfly occasionally also visits wet patches. In parts of Sri Lanka, the males are known to congregate and form a beautiful sight while mud-puddling.

The common rose is active much earlier in the morning than most butterflies and remains so throughout the day until dusk. It flies just as readily in the shade as in the sun, and frequently visits flowers.

In drier regions, around noon, the butterfly rests in thickets to avoid the mid-day heat. Here, it will rest and venture forth only in the late afternoon once again.

In the evenings, it retires into wooded areas or thickets in search of dead twigs or small branches on which to roost. It prefers sites that are 10 to 15 feet above ground, below the canopy in trees with sufficient cover from the elements, where it frequently roosts in the company of others of its type, and, sometimes, in the company of the crimson rose.

It flies high, slowly and often descends to nectar on flowers below. On such occasions it often dives down with its wings held back, and as it approaches the flower, the wings open up to provide deceleration. The butterfly primarily depends on motive thrust on the powerful flapping of its forewings while the hindwings act as a balancing and steering mechanism. This flying technique gives a rather unusual look to its flight and an observer is left with the impression that it is dragging itself through the air with only the assistance of its forewings.

The common rose is often the preferred species to show the amateur naturalist the utility of the tails in steering. This can be most easily observed when the common rose hovers over flowers to sip nectar. Then, its forewings beat readily to give it buoyancy while the tails move delicately to steer and adjust its position.

It has been considered in the past that these tails are primarily for deception as in the case of the Polyommatinae where the thread-like tails resemble antennae and confuse the attacker as to the location of the head. On occasions, roses have been observed with damaged tails and it is possible that the presence of swallowtails occasionally does favour the butterfly in confusing attackers.

== Life cycle ==
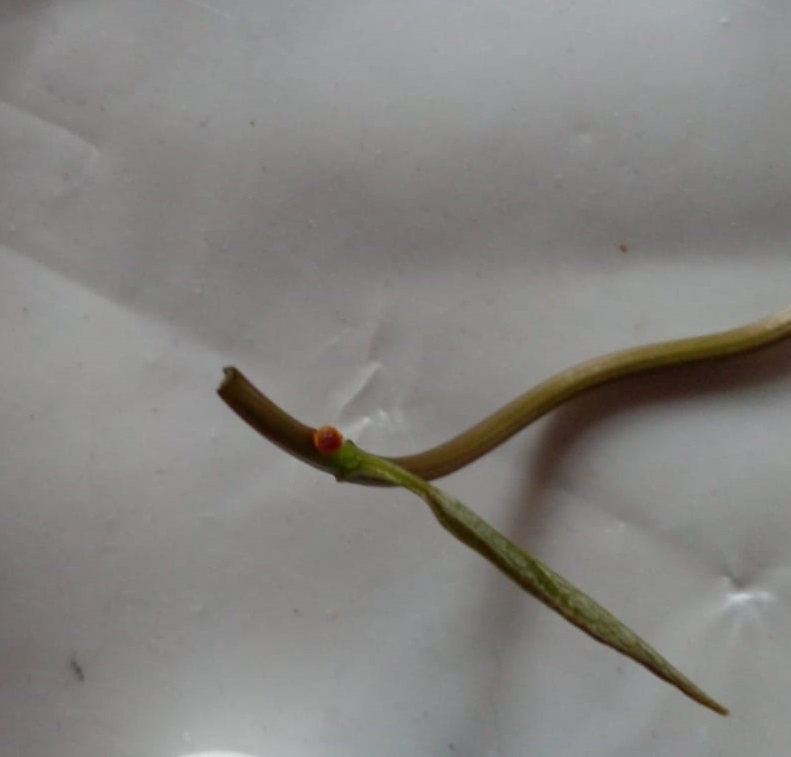
Egg

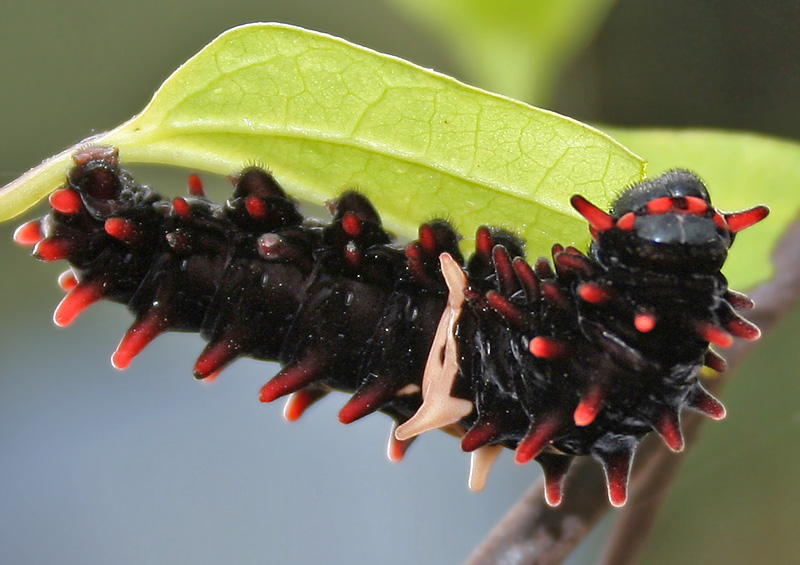
Caterpillar

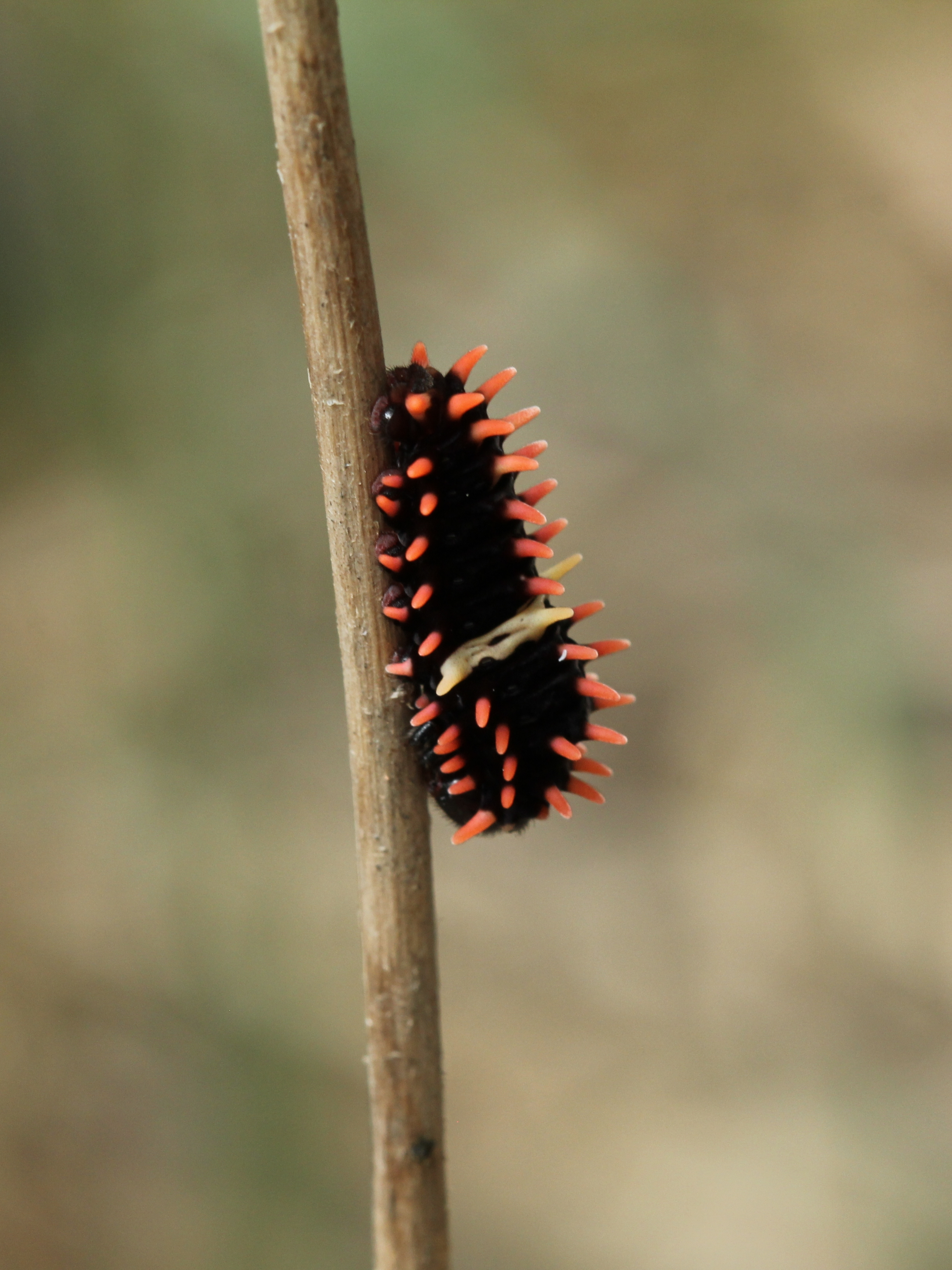
Pre-pupal caterpillar

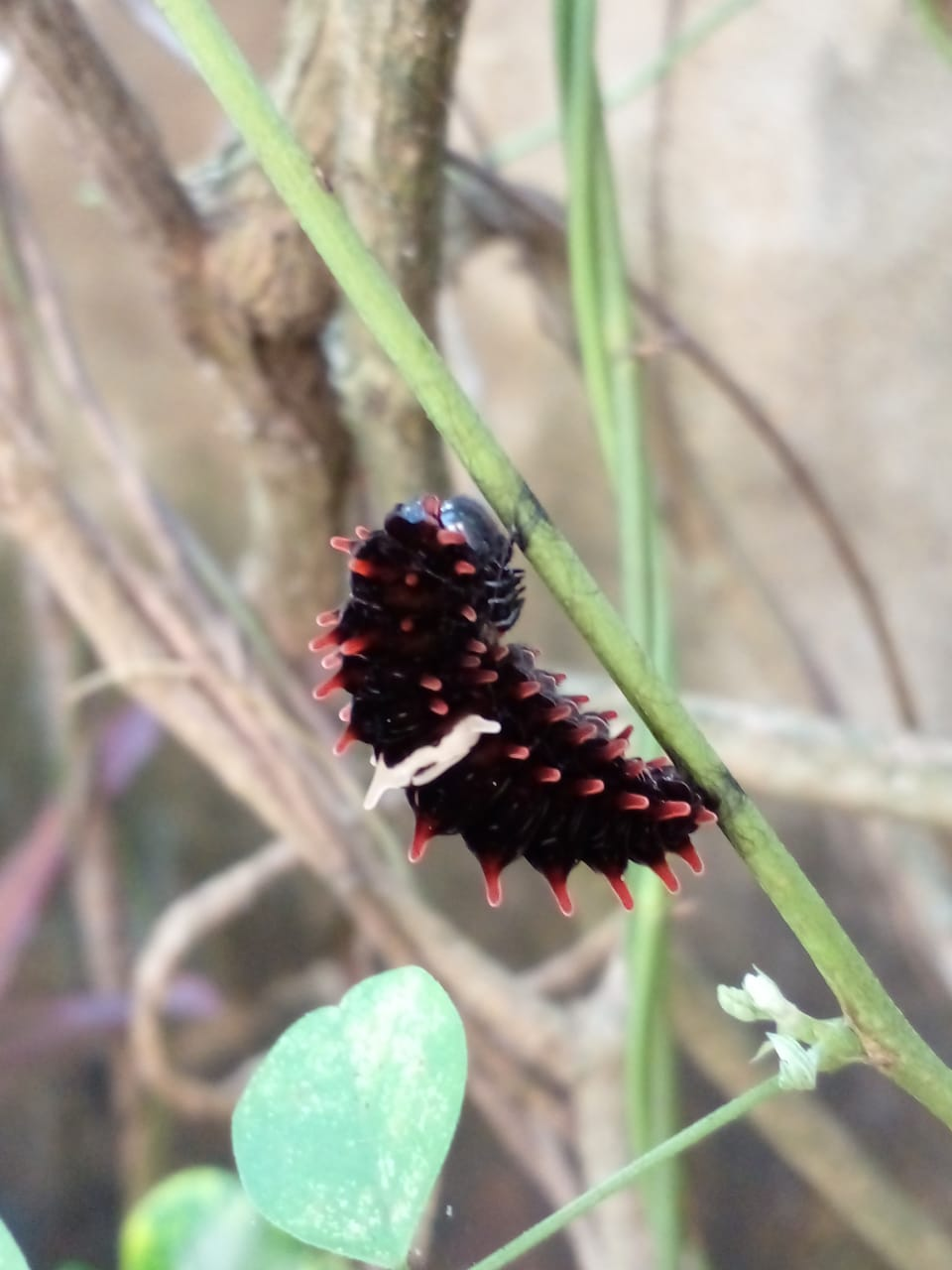
Pre-pupal caterpillar

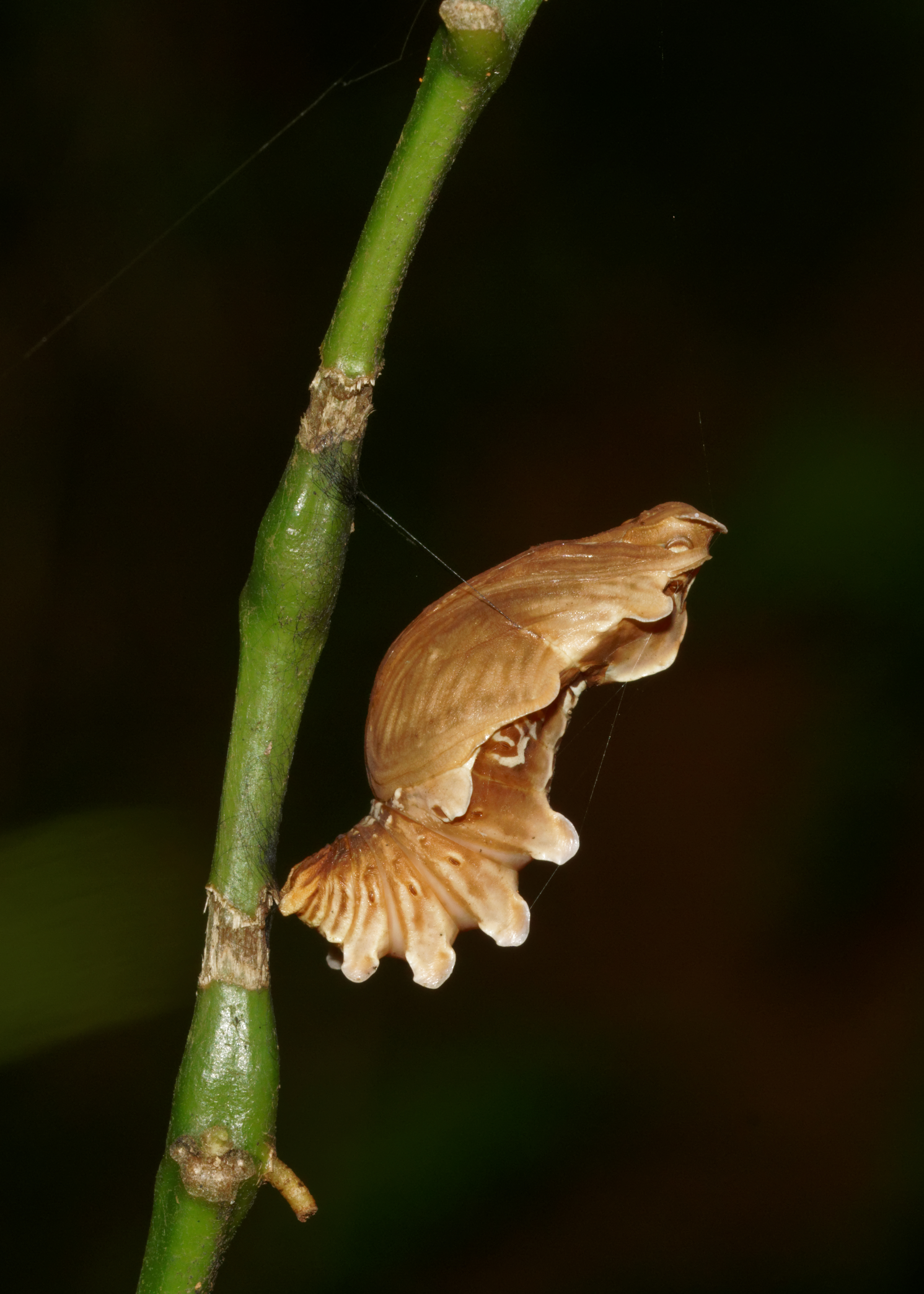
Pupa

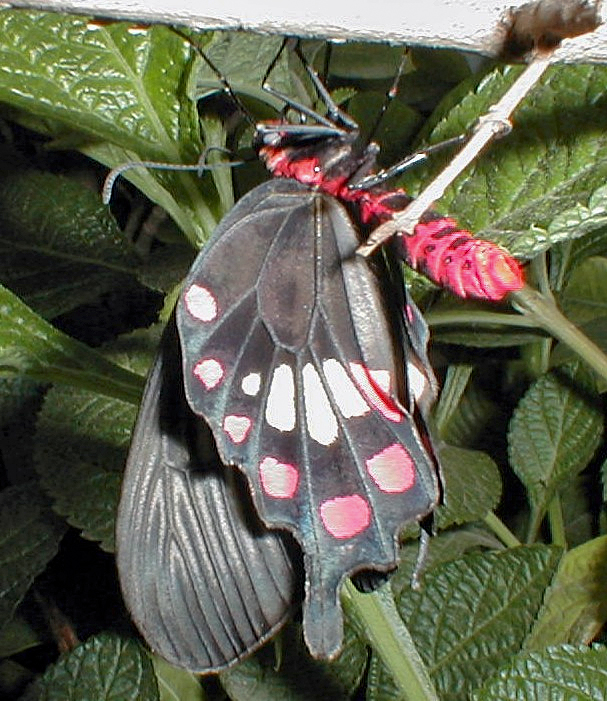
Freshly emerged adult

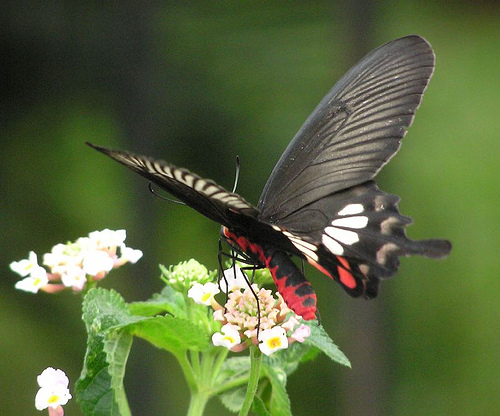
Adult

=== Eggs ===
The female has been observed inspecting Aristolochia plants and selecting healthy plants with verdant growth to ensure adequacy of food for its voracious caterpillars. It lays round and reddish eggs with fine black markings. The eggs are laid singly on top, the underside of leaves or even on shoots.

=== Caterpillar ===
The caterpillar is a velvety-maroon colour and has a white band on a segment on its middle reminiscent of a belt or collar. It has numerous fleshy red-tipped white protuberances on the body. It is bulky and slow in its movements.

=== Pupa ===
The pupa is brownish with various shades of brown and pink markings. It is attached to its support by the tail and held at an angle by a body band. The support is usually a stick. The distinguishing feature of the common rose pupa is the presence of large semi-circular projections on the back of the abdomen, thorax and head.

== Food plants ==
The larvae feed on creepers and climbers of the genus Aristolochia, family Aristolochiaceae, and they sequester toxins such as aristolochic acid in their bodies. This makes the adults toxic to vertebrate predators such as birds and reptiles. However the braconid wasps which parasitise the caterpillars have apparently co-evolved with the butterfly and are not affected by the toxins. Larval food plants include:

- Aristolochia bracteolata
- Aristolochia indica
- Aristolochia tagala
- Aristolochia griffithi
- Aristolochia leuconeura
- Thottea siliquosa

== See also ==
- Papilionidae
- List of butterflies of India
- List of butterflies of India (Papilionidae)

Chattopadhyay, Jagannath. (2007) "Swallowtail Butterflies, Biology and Ecology of a few Indian Species." Desh Prakashan, Kolkata, West Bengal, India. ISBN 978-81-905719-1-3.
