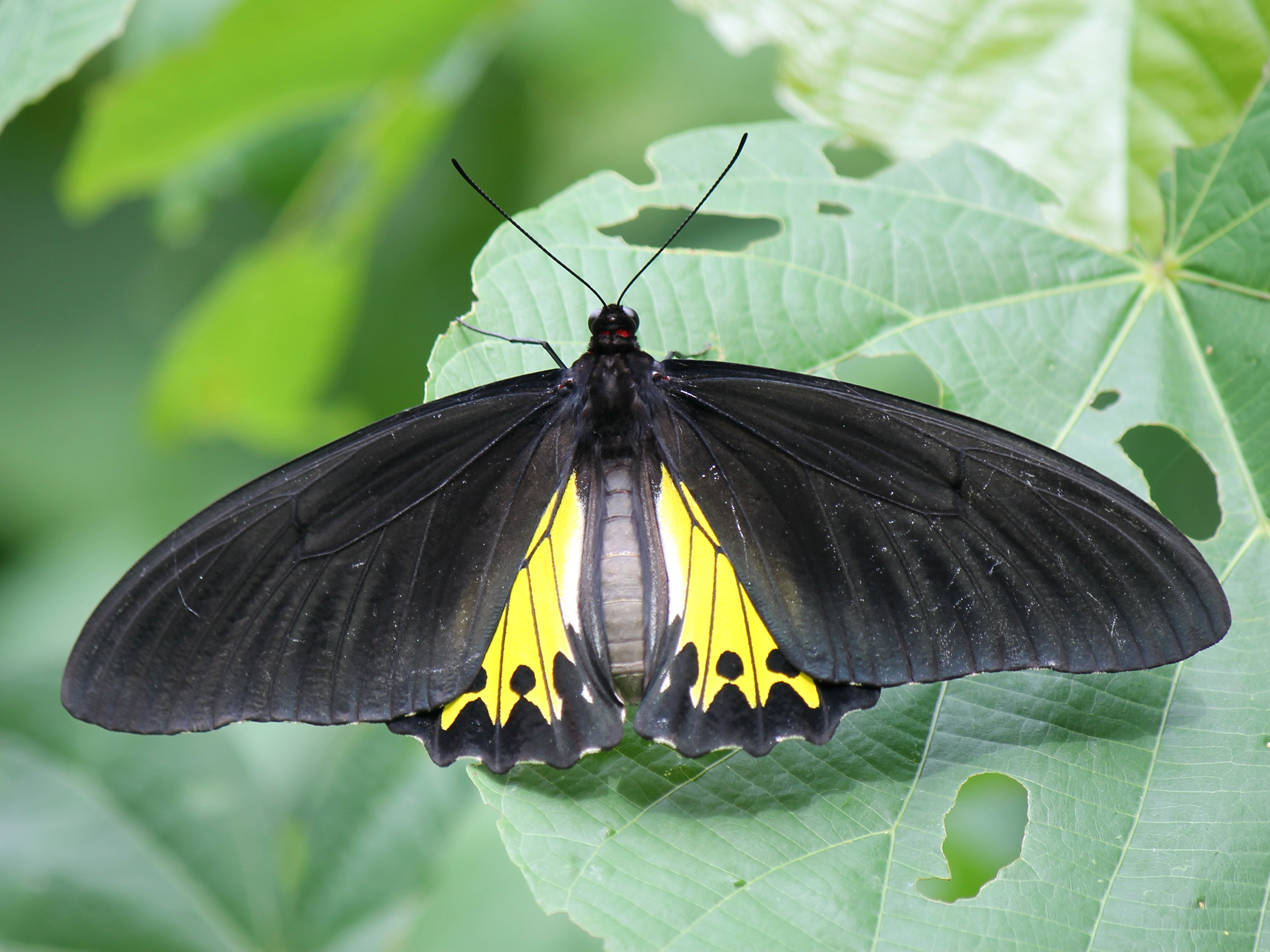
- Male, dorsal side, at Manado, North Sulawesi

Conservation status
- Least Concern (IUCN 3.1)
- CITES Appendix II

Scientific classification
- Kingdom: Animalia
- Phylum: Arthropoda
- Clade: Pancrustacea
- Class: Insecta
- Order: Lepidoptera
- Family: Papilionidae
- Genus: Troides
- Species: T. helena

Binomial name
- Troides helena (Linnaeus, 1758)

Subspecies
- 17, see text

= Troides helena =

Common birdwing

Species of butterfly

Troides helena, the common birdwing, is a butterfly belonging to the family Papilionidae. It is often found in the wildlife trade due to its popularity with butterfly collectors. The butterfly has seventeen subspecies.

Troides helena cerberus. Video clip

== Description ==
The description of the commonest subspecies of the butterfly in India, T. h. cerberus Felder, is given below:

=== Male ===
Upperside of forewings are rich velvety black with adnervular pale streaks on either side of the veins beyond the cell. The cilia is short, black, alternated with pale buffy white in the middle of the interspaces.

Hindwing: the abdominal fold, the apical half obliquely of interspace 1, the termen broadly, the base of the cell and the costal area up to and including the basal half of interspace 7 velvety black, the rest of the wing rich silky yellow; the veins prominently but narrowly black; the inner margin of the terminal black border produced inwards into prominent cone-shaped markings in the interspaces.

All specimens have one or more postdiscal black spots in the interspaces, but never a complete series; in interspace 2 and sometimes also in interspace 3 these spots coalesce with the cone-shaped projections of the terminal black border. Underneath the abdominal fold is a dense mass of buffy-white scented cottony pubescence. Underside similar, the adnervular pale streaks on the forewing broader and more prominent.

Hindwing: dorsal margin broadly black, with an edging of long soft black hairs; interspace 1 with a large oval postdiscal and a terminal black spot; interspace 2 with the postdiscal black spot generally separate from the cone-shaped projection of the black terminal border; the apical and lateral margins of interspaces 2-6 pale yellow irrorated (sprinkled) with black scales.

Antenna, head and thorax black, the collar narrowly crimson; abdomen yellow, shaded above with black; beneath: the thorax with a large lateral patch of crimson, the anal segment prominently buff coloured.

=== Female ===
Upper and under sides of the female is similar to those in the male, but with the following differences:

- Forewing: the adnervular pale streaks broader and more prominent.
- Hindwing: the black at base and along the costal margin broader, occupying fully one-third of the cell, the area above it and above vein 7, interrupted however, in interspace 7 near the apex of wing, by a transverse yellow mark which is sometimes subobsolete; a postdiscal series of large oval black spots, those in interspaces 2 and 3 often joined on the upperside to the cone-shaped terminal black marks; dorsal margin also more broadly black, without the fringe of black hairs and or course of the abdominal fold. Antenna, head and thorax as in the male; abdomen dark brownish black above.

== Subspecies ==
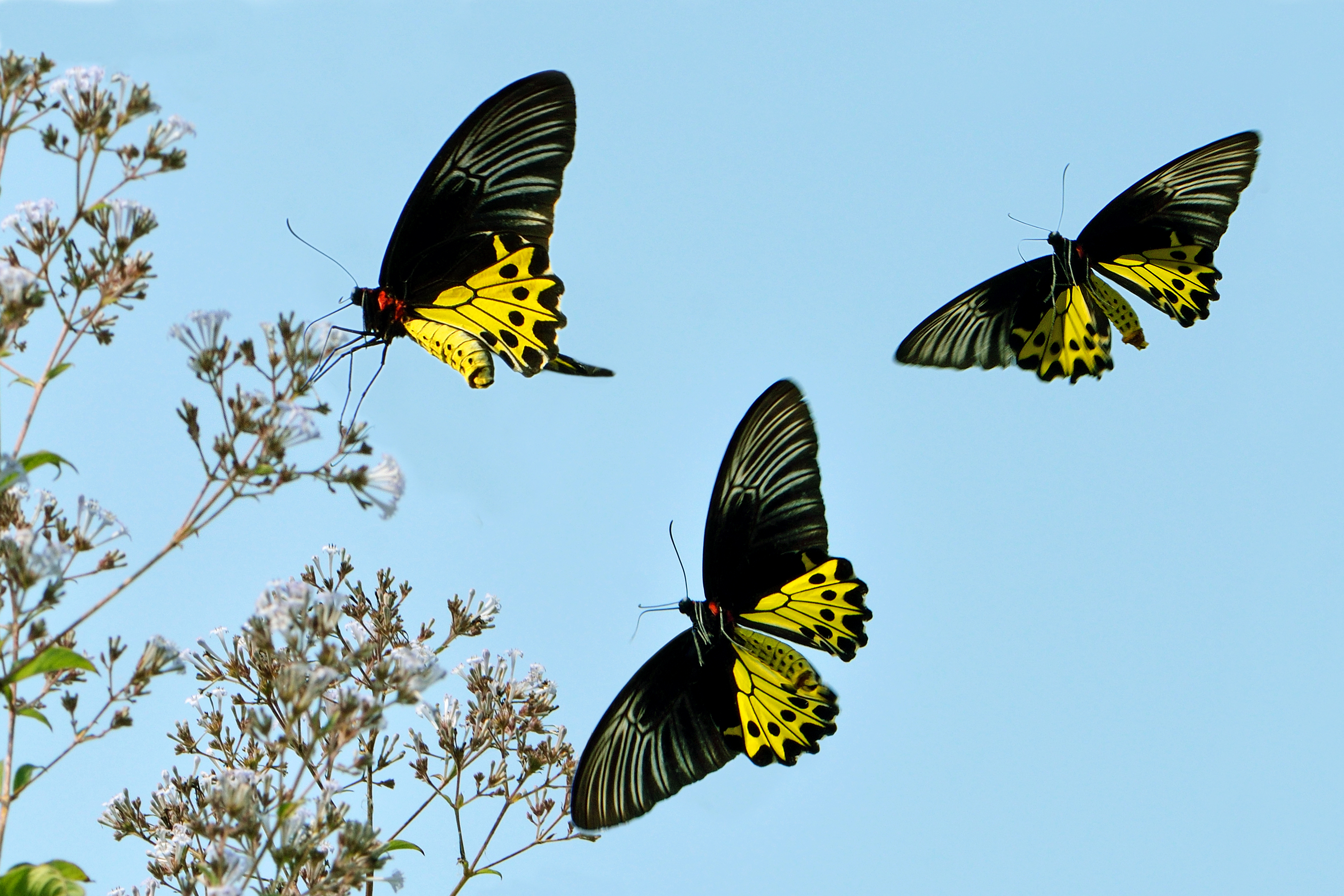
Flight and nectaring

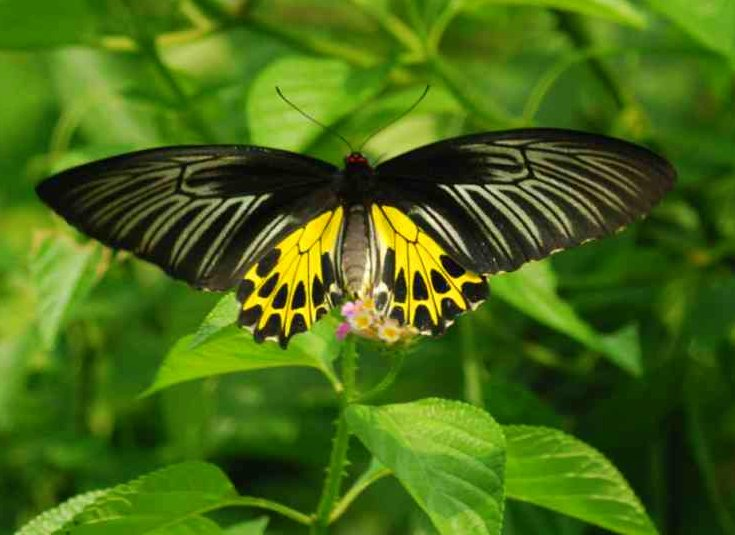
Common birdwing (সোনাল), Kolkata, West Bengal, India

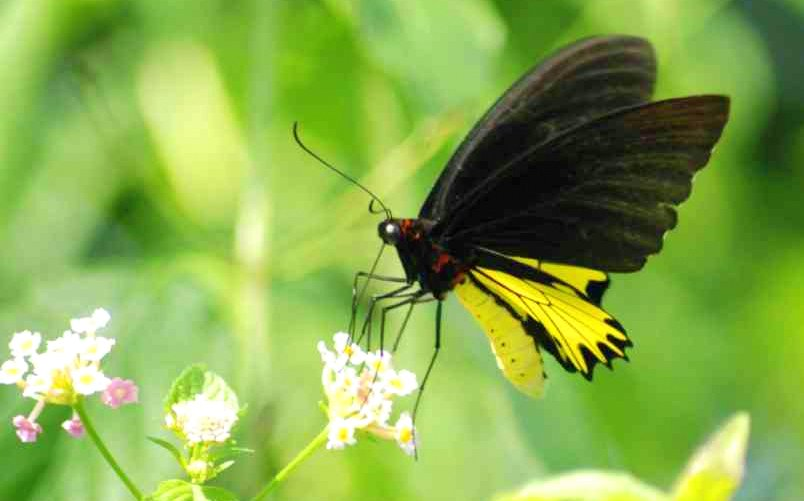
Common birdwing (সোনাল), Kolkata, West Bengal, India

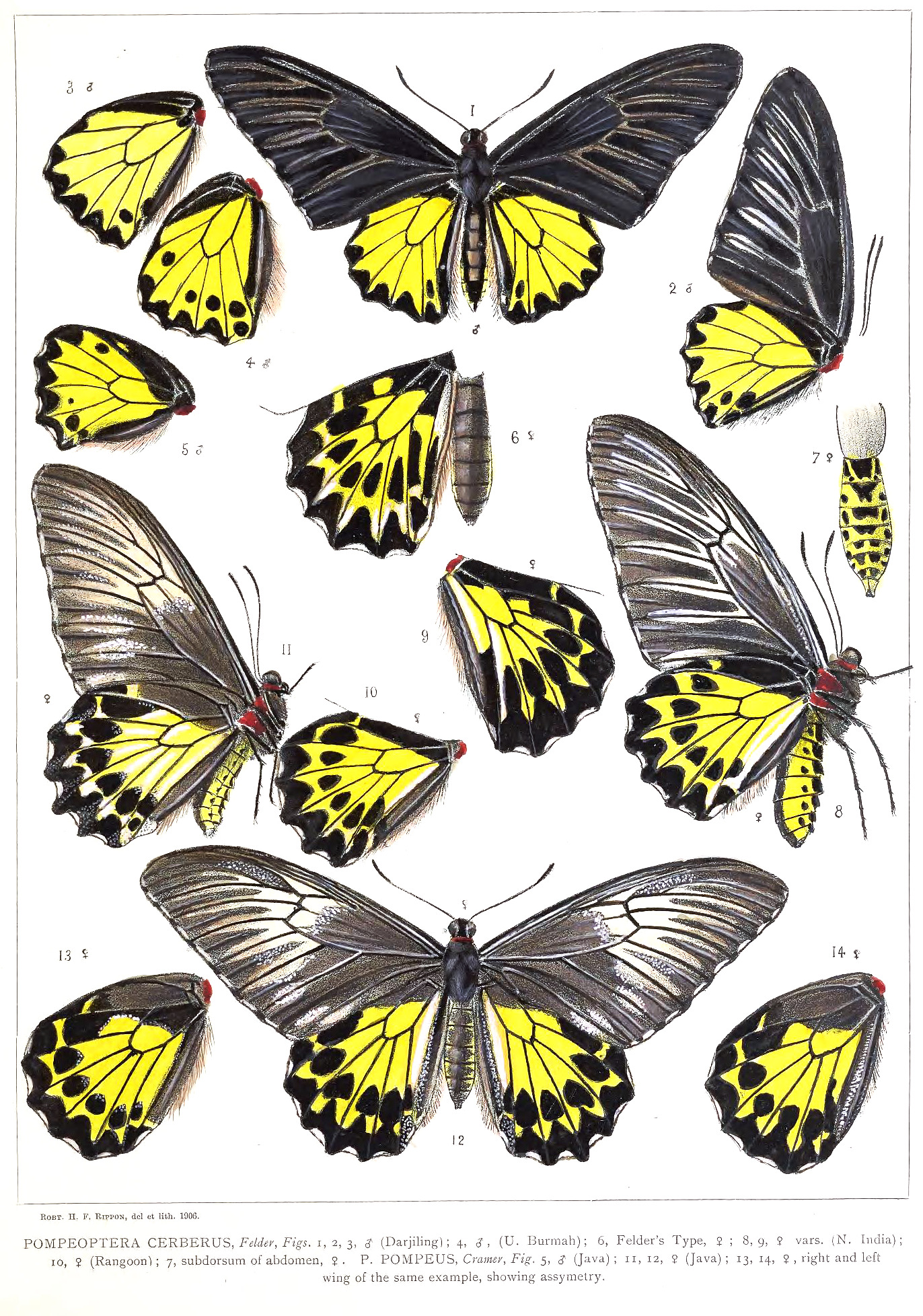
Illustration of males and females

- T. h. antileuca Rothschild, 1908
- T. h. bunguranensis Ohya, 1982
- T. h. cerberus (C. & R. Felder, 1865)
- T. h. demeter Rumbucher & Schäffler, 2005
- T. h. dempoensis Deslisle, 1993
- T. h. euthycrates Fruhstorfer, 1913
- T. h. ferrari Tytler, 1926
- T. h. hahneli Rumbucher & Schäffler, 2005
- T. h. heliconoides (Moore, 1877)
- T. h. hephaestus (Felder, 1865)
- T. h. hermes Hayami, 1991
- T. h. hypnos Rumbucher & Schäffler, 2005
- T. h. isara Rothschild, 1908
- T. h. mopa Rothschild, 1908
- T. h. mosychlus Fruhstorfer, 1913
- T. h. neoris Rothschild, 1908
- T. h. nereides Fruhstorfer, 1906
- T. h. nereis (Doherty, 1891)
- T. h. orientis Parrott, 1991
- T. h. propinquus Rothschild, 1895
- T. h. rayae Deslisle, 1991
- T. h. sagittatus Fruhstorfer, 1896
- T. h. spilotia Rothschild, 1908
- T. h. sugimotoi Hanafusa, 1992
- T. h. typhaon Rothschild, 1908
- T. h. venus Hayami, 1991

== Distribution and status ==
T. helena is widely distributed and locally common in forest areas. Globally it is found in Nepal, India, Bangladesh, Myanmar, peninsular and eastern Malaysia, Singapore, Indonesia, Laos, Cambodia, Thailand, Vietnam, southern China including Hainan, and Hong Kong. In the Indonesian archipelago, T. helena is found in Sumatra, Nias, Enggano, Java, Bawean, Kangean Islands, Bali, Lombok, Sumbawa, Great Natuna (Bunguran), Sulawesi, Butung, Tukangbesi, Kalimantan, and Brunei.

In Hong Kong, T. helena is at the northern limit of its range. It is not common in Hong Kong but it is observed that there are stable populations in three sites (the surrounding area of Po Lo Che (Sai Kung District), Shan Liu Road (Tai Po) and Kadoorie Farm & Botanic Garden in the New Territories). It is also found on Lantau Island and Hong Kong Island.

In India the T. helena is found in the north-east of the country including Sikkim, West Bengal, and Orissa. It is also found in the Andaman and Nicobar Islands. The subspecies found in India are:

- T. h. cerberus (C. & R. Felder, 1865) – Arunachal Pradesh, Assam, Meghalaya, Nagaland, Manipur, Orissa, Mizoram, Sikkim, Tripura, W. Bengal.
- T. h. heliconoides (Moore, 1877) – Andaman Is.
- T. h. ferrari Tytler, 1926 – South Nicobar Is.

The common birdwing, though widespread and common in many of the localities in which it occurs, was classified as vulnerable in 1985.

== Etymology ==
Helen in Greek mythology was the daughter of Zeus. Cerberus is a multi-headed hound who guards the gates of the Underworld.

== Conservation ==
This species is protected under Wild Animals Protection Ordinance Cap 170 in Hong Kong. The common birdwing is protected in Indonesia and may also require protection in peninsular Malaya also. It is listed in Appendix II of Convention on the International Trade in Endangered Species of Wild Flora and Fauna (CITES) as are all other Troides species.

== Food plants ==
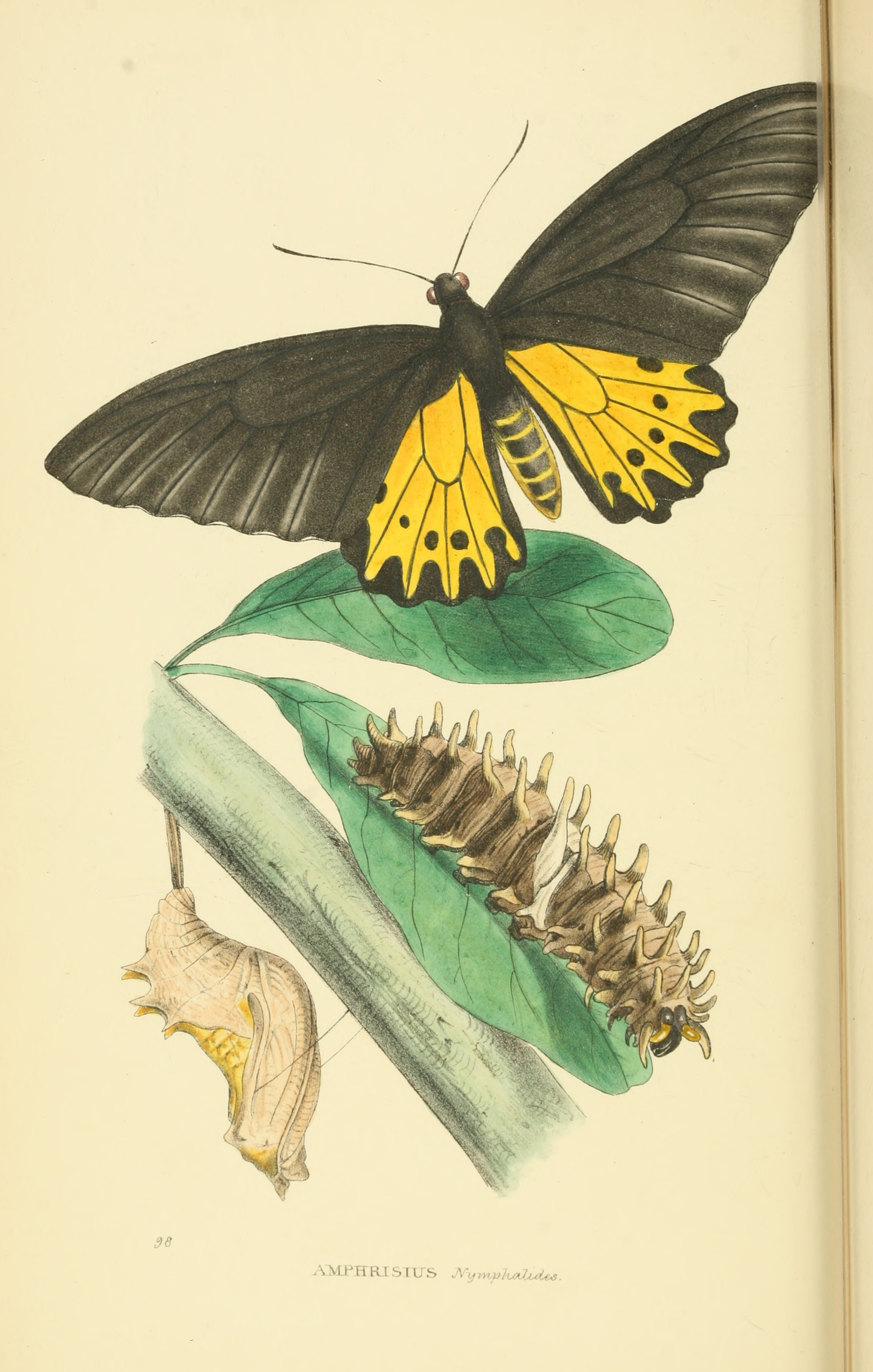
Illustration including larva and pupa of Troides helena

The larval food plants include Aristolochia indica, Aristolochia tagala and Thottea siliquosa. A food plant for the species, Aristolochia tagala has been planted in the Kadoorie Farm and Shan Liu Road in Hong Kong to sustain a healthy population of the species.

== Related species ==
Troides helena is a member of the helena species group. The members of this clade are:

- Troides helena (Linnaeus, 1758)
- Troides oblongomaculatus (Goeze, 1779)
- Troides × celebensis (Wallace, 1865)

== See also ==
- Papilionidae
- List of butterflies of India
- List of butterflies of India (Papilionidae)
- List of protected species in Hong Kong
