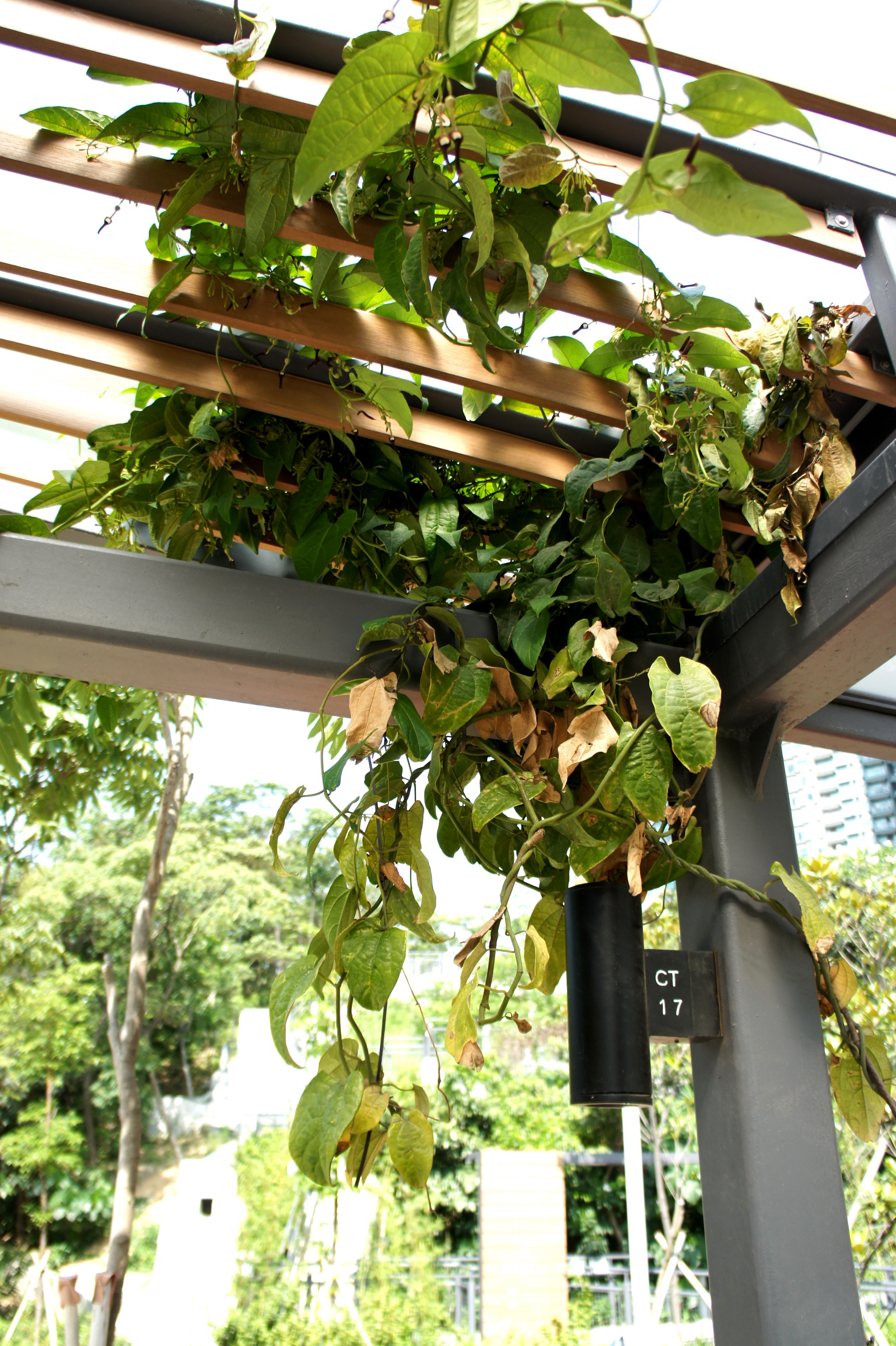

Scientific classification
- Kingdom: Plantae
- Clade: Tracheophytes
- Clade: Angiosperms
- Clade: Magnoliids
- Order: Piperales
- Family: Aristolochiaceae
- Genus: Aristolochia
- Species: A. tagala

Binomial name
- Aristolochia tagala Cham.

= Aristolochia tagala =

India birthwort

Species of vine

Aristolochia tagala is commonly known as Indian birthwort and locally as Dutchman's pipe.

== Distribution ==
It is widely distributed: the distribution is from the Himalaya to Sri Lanka through South East Asia (includes Myanmar, Indonesia, Indochina, and Thailand) and China, to Oceania (includes the whole of Malesia, the Solomon Islands and Queensland in Australia). The species is found in forests and open lowland thickets, climbing over bushes and trees.

== Ecological roles ==
The caterpillars of two butterflies, the common birdwing (Troides helena cerberus) and common rose (Pachliopta aristolochiae), feed on the leaves of this plant. A food plant for the species, Aristolochia tagala has been planted in the Kadoorie Farm and Shan Liu Road in Hong Kong to sustain a healthy population of common birdwings.

== Uses ==
The species is used as medicines. The Malays pound the leaves apply it to the head to treat fever. In Indonesia, poultice are made with leaves of the species; it is applied to the swollen abdomen or limbs. In the Philippines, snake bites and malaria are treated with the plant. In India, the roots are considered a tonic, carminative and emmenagogue.

== Alkaloids ==
- 7-Hydroxyaristolochic acid A [79185-75-4]

== Protection ==
In Hong Kong, this species is under protection based on Forestry Regulations Cap. 96A.
