= Dutchman's pipe =

Dutchman's pipe is a common name for some unrelated flowering plants, which have flowers, inflorescences or stems resembling a pipe:

- Aristolochia species (birthworts or pipevines) from the Aristolochiaceae, particularly Aristolochia macrophylla
- Epiphyllum oxypetalum ("night-blooming cereus") from the Cactaceae
- Monotropa hypopitys (also known as yellow bird's-nest or pinesap) from the Ericaceae
