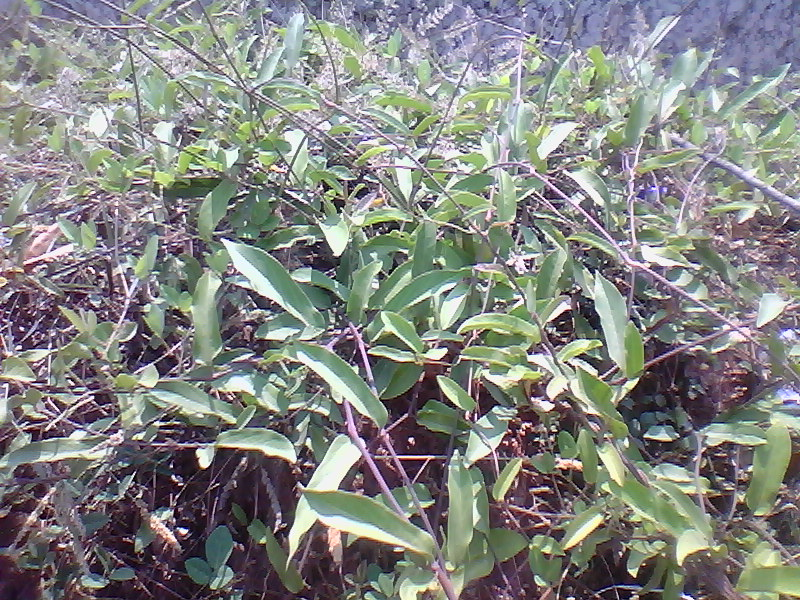

Scientific classification
- Kingdom: Plantae
- Clade: Tracheophytes
- Clade: Angiosperms
- Clade: Magnoliids
- Order: Piperales
- Family: Aristolochiaceae
- Genus: Aristolochia
- Species: A. indica

Binomial name
- Aristolochia indica L.

= Aristolochia indica =

Species of vine

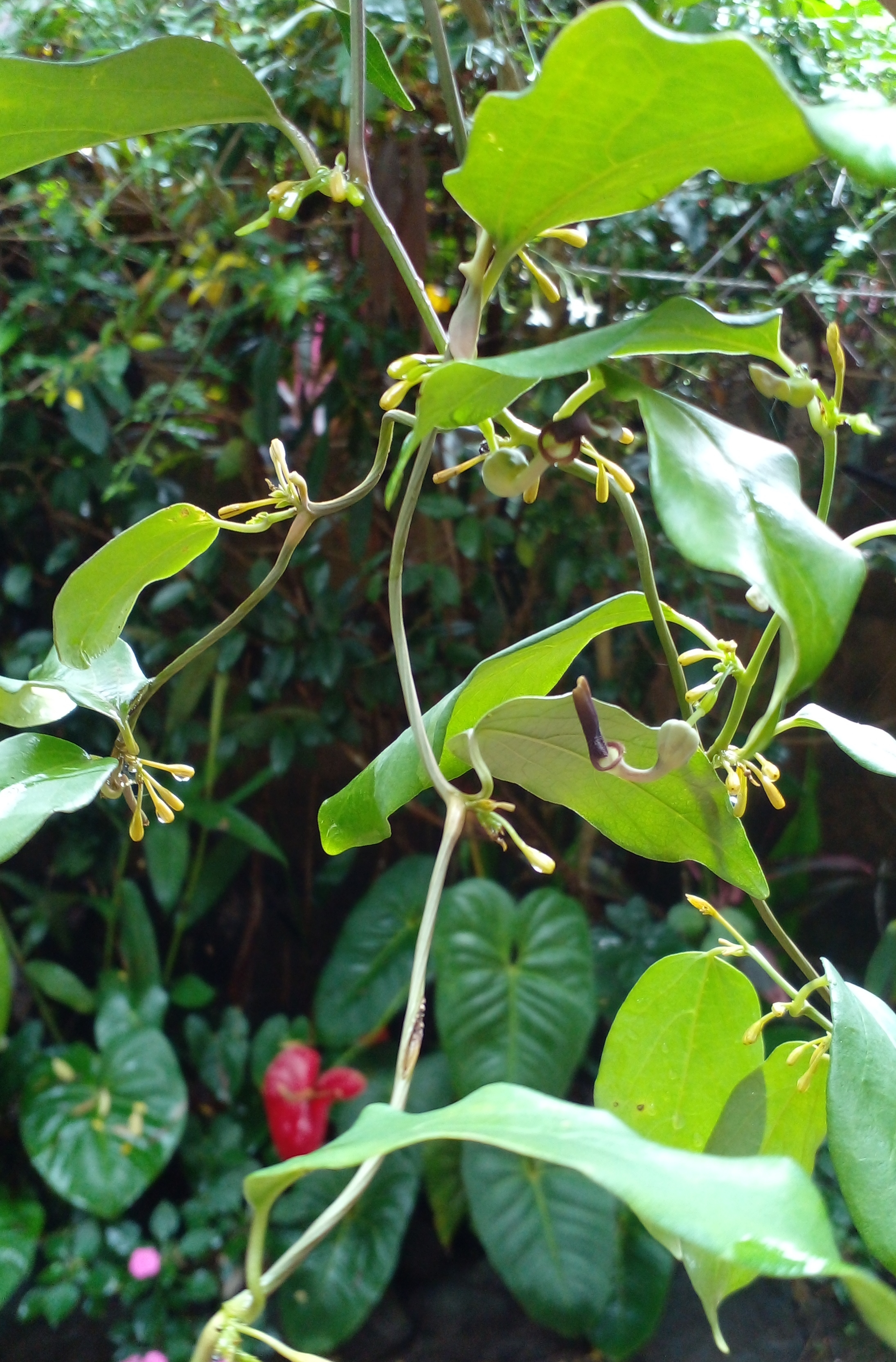
Aristolochis Plant

Aristolochia indica (native language: Garudakkodi / Eswaramooli) is a creeper plant found in Southern India and also Sri Lanka. It Is known as 'sapsada' in Sri Lanka and is critical to the survival of the southern birdwing and common birdwing, as well as crimson and common rose butterflies. It reaches a height of several metres on trees and cover the branches with thick foliage. It is commonly found in forest floor, rocky hillslopes. It flowers once a year to produce seeds. It can also be propagated by roots. The plant has a number of historical medicinal uses.

== Toxicity ==
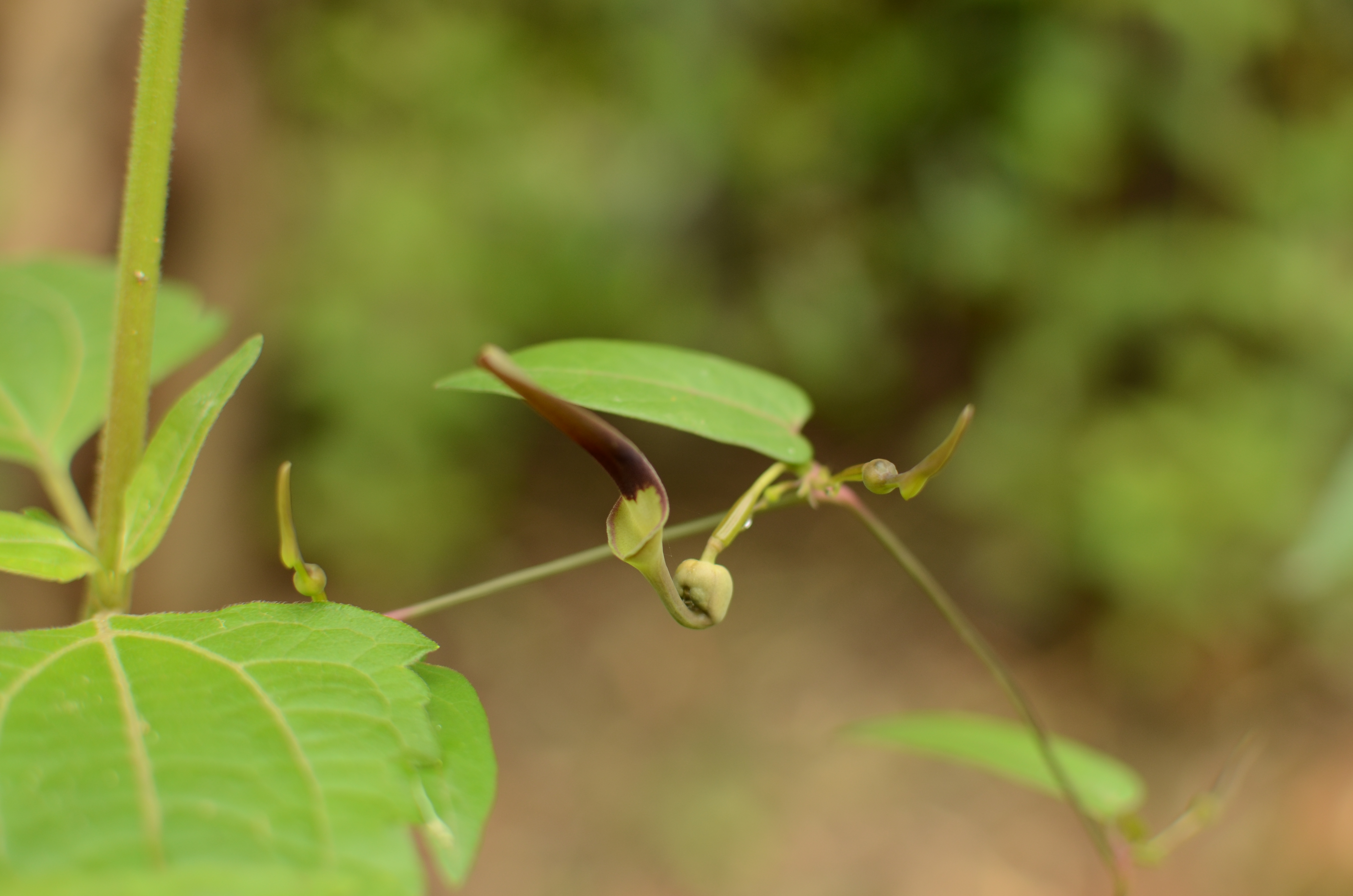
Aristolochia indica flower

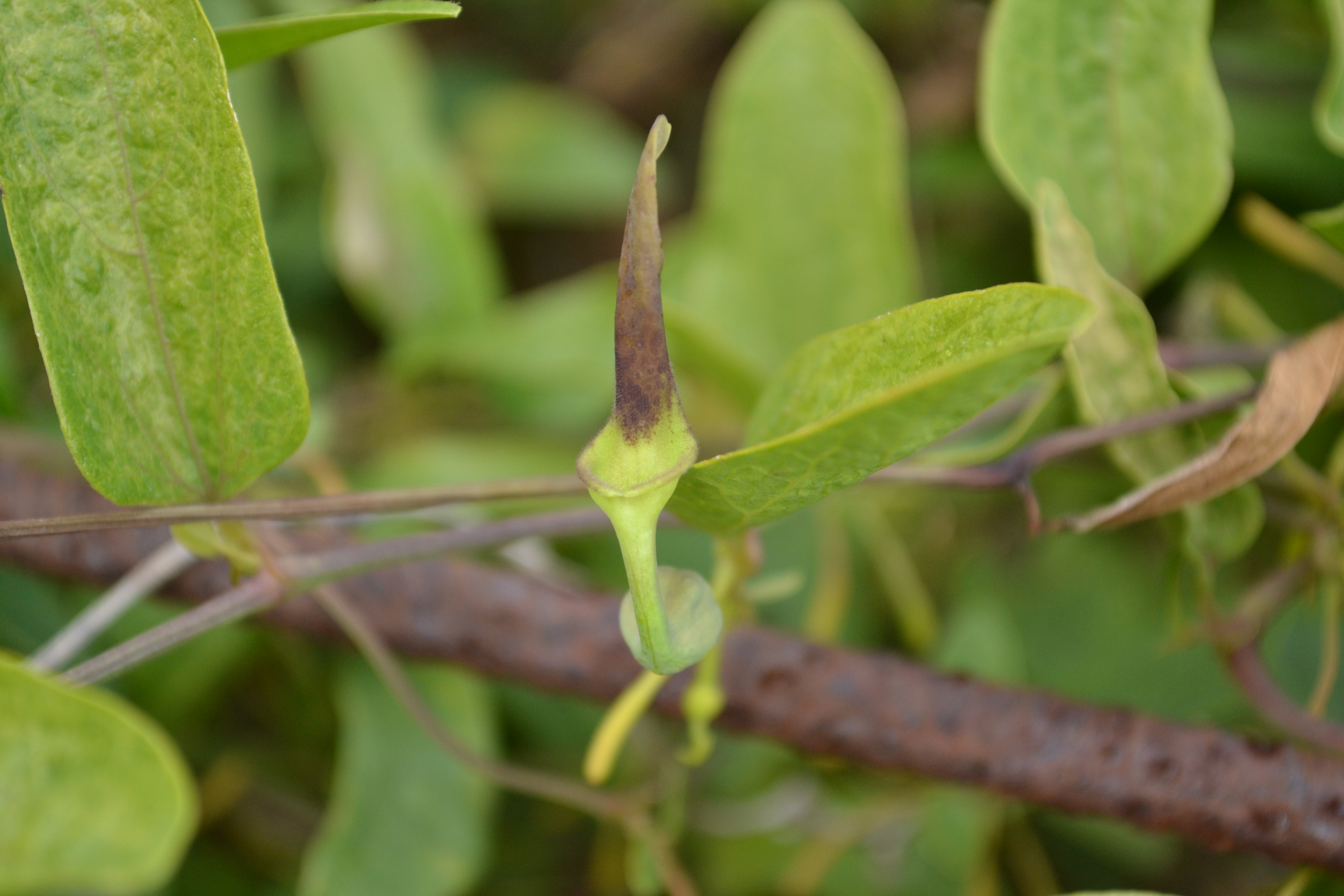
Arsitolochia indica - flower

This plant contains aristolochic acid, a carcinogen also found in various Aristolochia and Asarum plants, both in the family Aristolochiaceae. Aristolochic acid is composed of an about 1:1 mixture of two forms, aristolochic acid I and aristolochic acid II.

In addition to its carcinogenicity, aristolochic acid is also highly nephrotoxic and may be a causative agent in Balkan nephropathy. However, despite these well-documented dangers, aristolochic acid still is present sometimes in herbal remedies (such as for weight loss), primarily because of substitution of innocuous herbs with Aristolochia species. The alcoholic extract is more toxic than the water extract.
