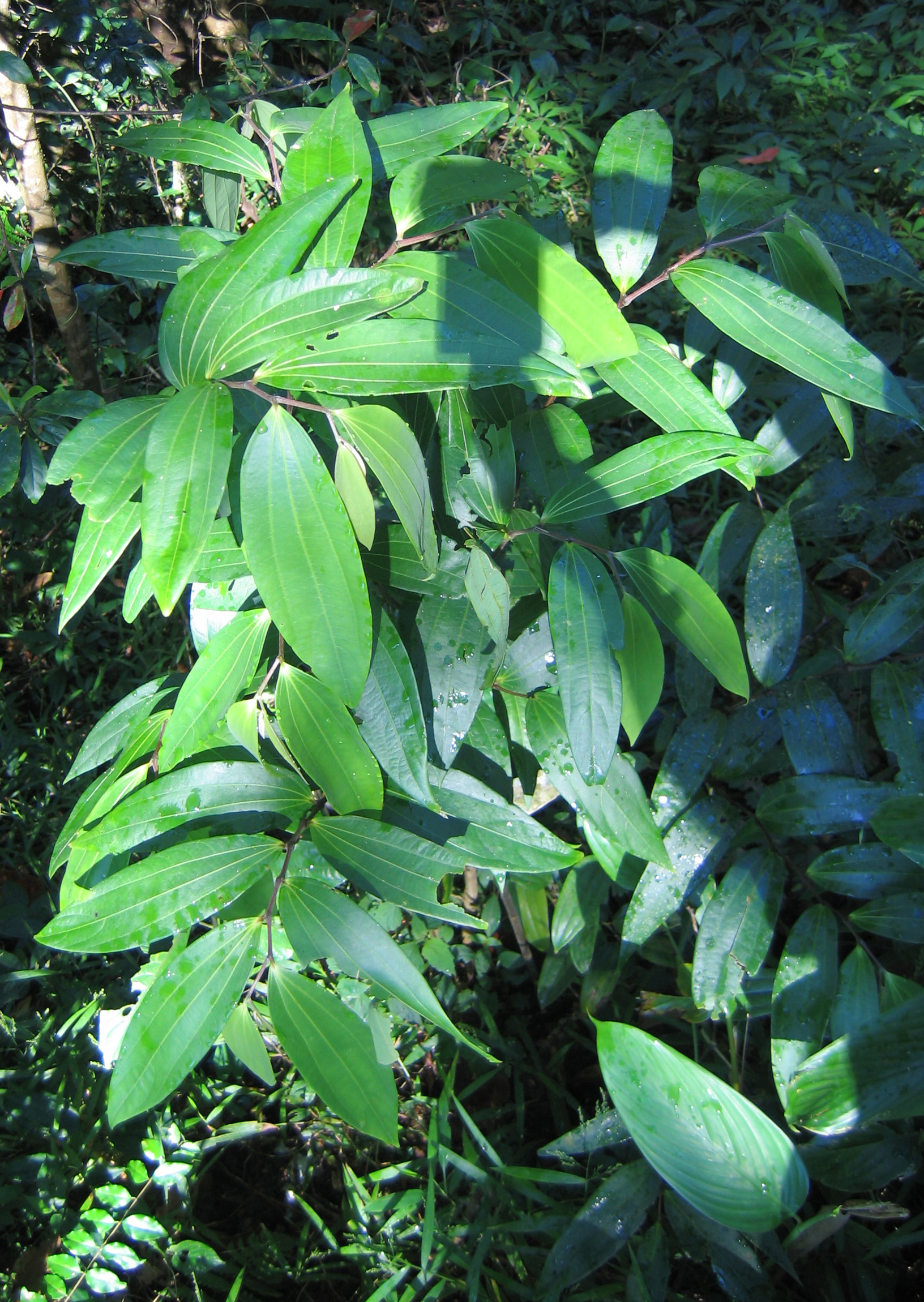

Scientific classification
- Kingdom: Plantae
- Clade: Tracheophytes
- Clade: Angiosperms
- Clade: Magnoliids
- Order: Piperales
- Family: Aristolochiaceae
- Genus: Thottea
- Species: T. siliquosa

Binomial name
- Thottea siliquosa (Lam.) Ding Hou

Synonyms
- Apama laurifolia Raf.; Apama siliquosa Lam.; Bragantia hispida Thwaites ex Duch.; Bragantia wallichii Wight & Arn.; Trimeriza piperina Lindl.

= Thottea siliquosa =

Species of flowering plant

Thottea siliquosa is a species of flowering plant in the family Aristolochiaceae. It is used as an Ayurvedic medicine in India and Sri Lanka.
