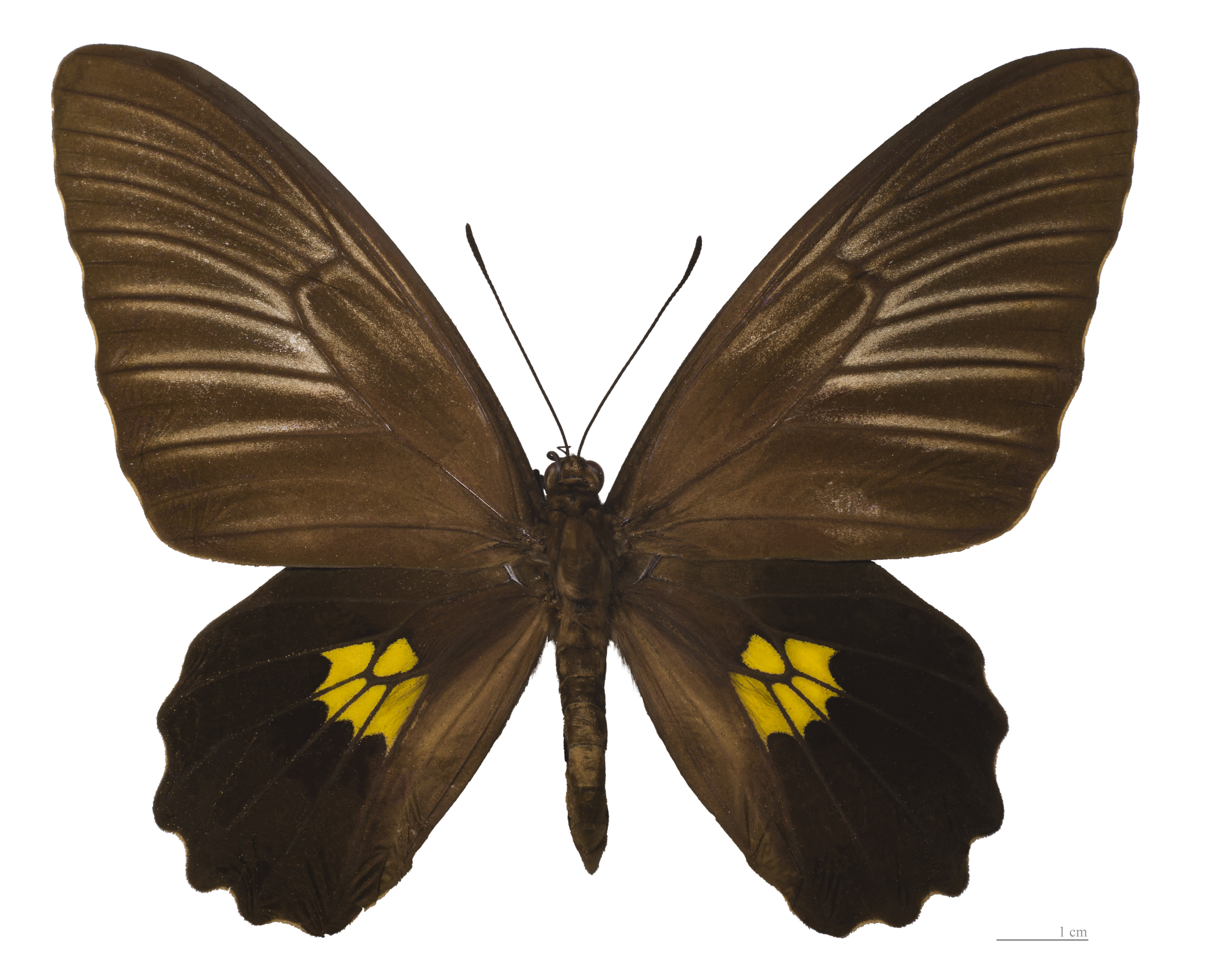

Conservation status
- CITES Appendix II

Scientific classification
- Kingdom: Animalia
- Phylum: Arthropoda
- Clade: Pancrustacea
- Class: Insecta
- Order: Lepidoptera
- Family: Papilionidae
- Genus: Troides
- Species: T. staudingeri

Binomial name
- Troides staudingeri (Röber, 1888)

Synonyms
- Ornithoptera staudingeri Röber, 1888

= Troides staudingeri =

Species of butterfly

Troides staudingeri is a birdwing butterfly in the genus Troides in the family Papilionidae. It is known from Leti Island, Moa Island, Kisar Island, Babar Island and Wetar Island.

== Description ==
staudingeri Rob. Male: forewing similar to that of iris, beneath with purer white stripes; hindwing almost as in naias, but always with 6 gold discal spots round the cell and the cell-spot more transversely truncate; the harpe similar to that of iris, almost symmetrical, whilst in the other haliphron-forms, it is almost hook-shaped. Female with broader vein-streaks on the forewing than in iris [ssp. (below)]; on the hindwing in addition to the cell-spot 6 gold spots, of which the first and last are much larger than in iris and ariadne [ssp. (below)]; the median veins at least beneath accompanied by yellow-grey stripes, similar stripes or small submarginal spots also often on the radials. Collar and breast in male and female red. Loeang, Dammer and Babber.

== Subspecies ==
- T. s. staudingeri (Sermata, Luang, Babar)
- T. s. iris (Röber, 1888) (Leti Group)
- T. s. ariadne Rothschild, 1908 (Islands of Romang Strait)
- T. s. heptanonius Fruhstorfer, 1913 (Damar Island)
- T. s. ikarus Fruhstorfer, 1904 (Tanimbar, Selaru, Yamdena, Larat) The male not different from staudingeri, the vein-stripes of the forewing beneath and also the edging of the cell, however, are longer and broader in some specimens. This grey-white scaling in the female apparently always more extended than in staudingeri. Selaru, Timor Laut Islands.
- T. s. rikyu Arima & Morimoto, 1991 (Teun, Nila, Serua)

== Biology ==
Like T. haliphron, T. staudingeri is a lowland species.

== Biogeographic realm ==
Australasian realm.

== Etymology ==
The specific name staudingeri honours the German entomologist Otto Staudinger.

== Taxonomy ==
Previously considered to be a subspecies of haliphron, staudingeri was raised to a full species by Haugum and Low on the basis of differences in the genitali. This was accepted by Hancock.

== Related species ==
Troides staudingeri is a member of the Troides haliphron species group. The members of this clade are:

- Troides haliphron (Boisduval, 1836)
- Troides darsius (Gray, [1853])
- Troides vandepolli (Snellen, 1890)
- Troides criton (C. & R. Felder, 1860)
- Troides riedeli (Kirsch, 1885)
- Troides plato (Wallace, 1865)
- Troides staudingeri (Röber, 1888)
