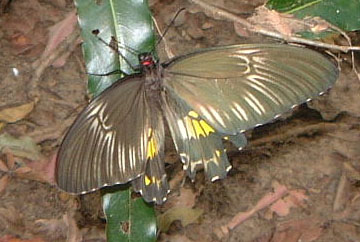

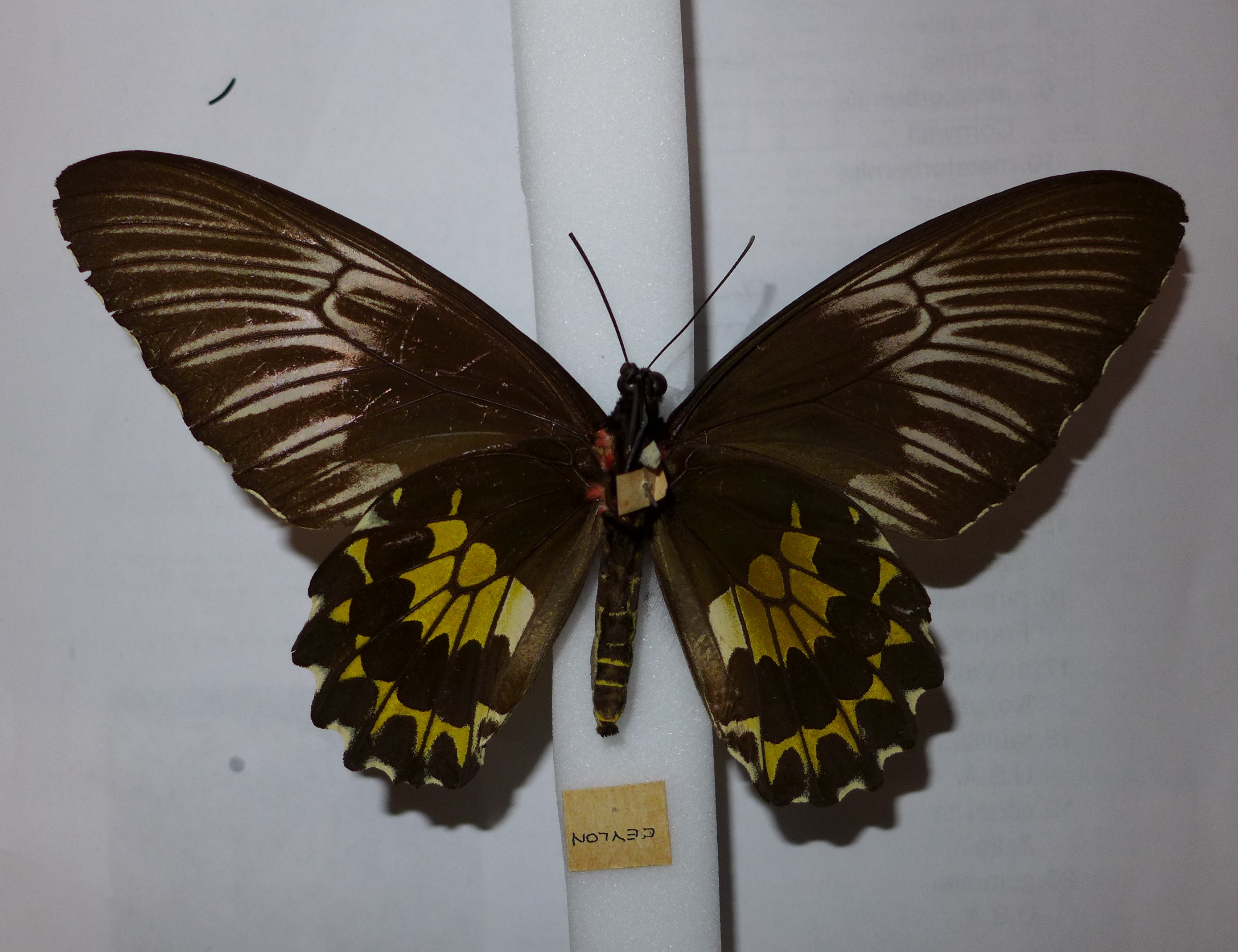

Conservation status
- CITES Appendix II

Scientific classification
- Kingdom: Animalia
- Phylum: Arthropoda
- Clade: Pancrustacea
- Class: Insecta
- Order: Lepidoptera
- Family: Papilionidae
- Genus: Troides
- Species: T. darsius

Binomial name
- Troides darsius (Gray, 1852)

= Troides darsius =

Sri Lankan birdwing

Species of butterfly

Troides darsius, the Sri Lankan birdwing, is a species of birdwing butterfly found in Sri Lanka. It is the largest butterfly on the island and is also the national butterfly of Sri Lanka.

Among the largest of the Ceylon Lepidoptera is the great black and yellow butterfly (Ornithoptera darsius, Gray); the upper wings, which measure six inches (15 cm) across, are deep velvet black. The lower wings are decorated with large yellow patches, which are slightly translucent. Its caterpillar form commonly eats plants in the genus aristolochia.

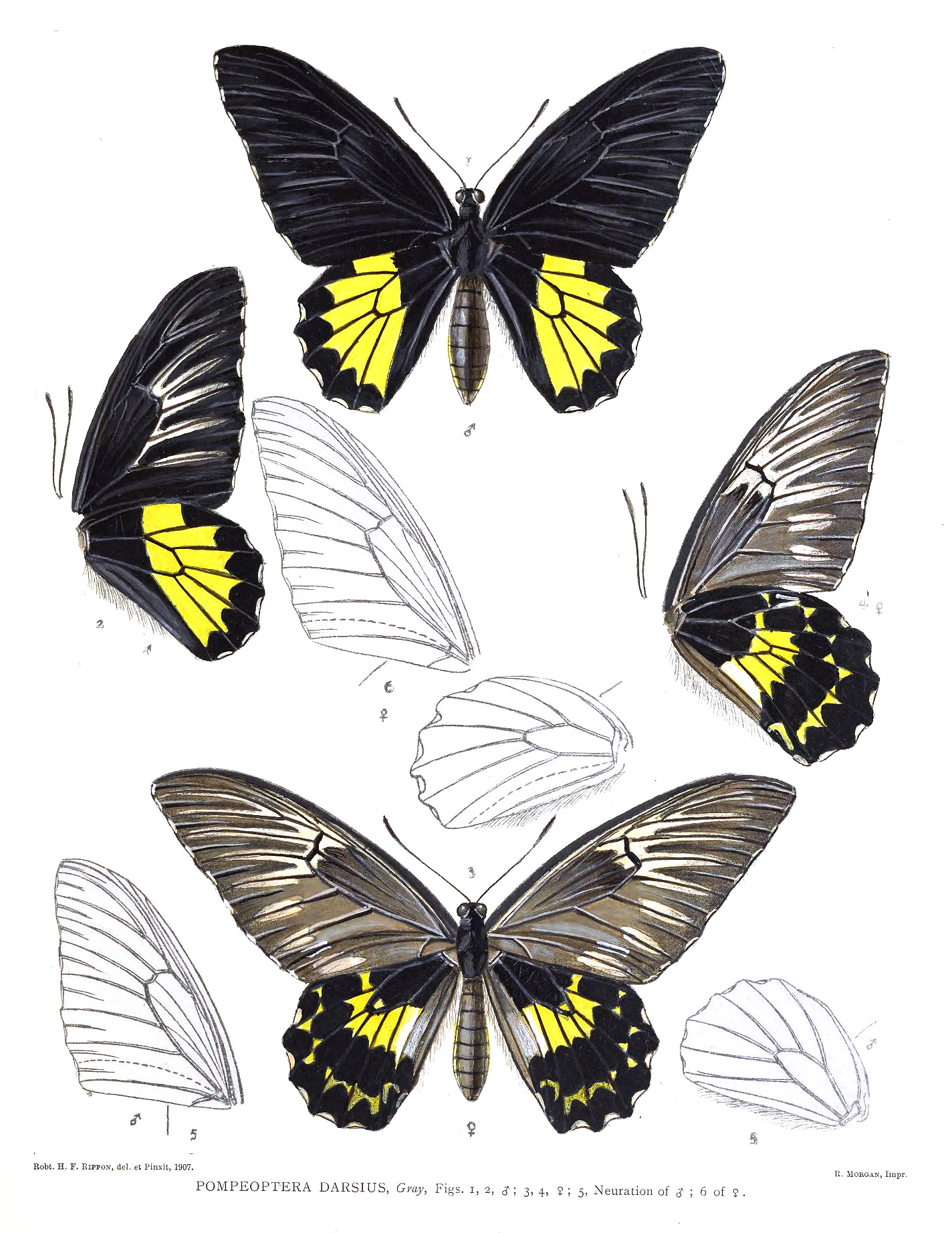
As Pompeoptera darsius in Robert Henry Fernando Rippon's Icones Ornithopterorum

== Description ==
From Troides helena cerberus it differs as follows:

Male forewing: adnervular pale streaks not prominent on the upperside, more distinctly marked on the underside. Hindwing black, with a very broad discal slightly curved silky-yellow band or patch that extends beyond the cell from interspaces 2 to 7, and is composed of elongate outwardly emarginate yellow markings that are divided only by the black veins. In most specimens the inner margin of this band crosses the apex of the cell, but in many the cell is entirely black. Abdomen with some black markings beneath and a lateral row of black spots.

Female: Differs from cerberus female in the much greater extent of the black on the hindwing. Interspace 1 with a pale dusky-white patch in the middle; interspace 7 with an inner and an outer yellow spot; cell entirely black or nearly so, sometimes, but rarely, with the yellow extended into the apex.

Wingspan of 165–175 mm.

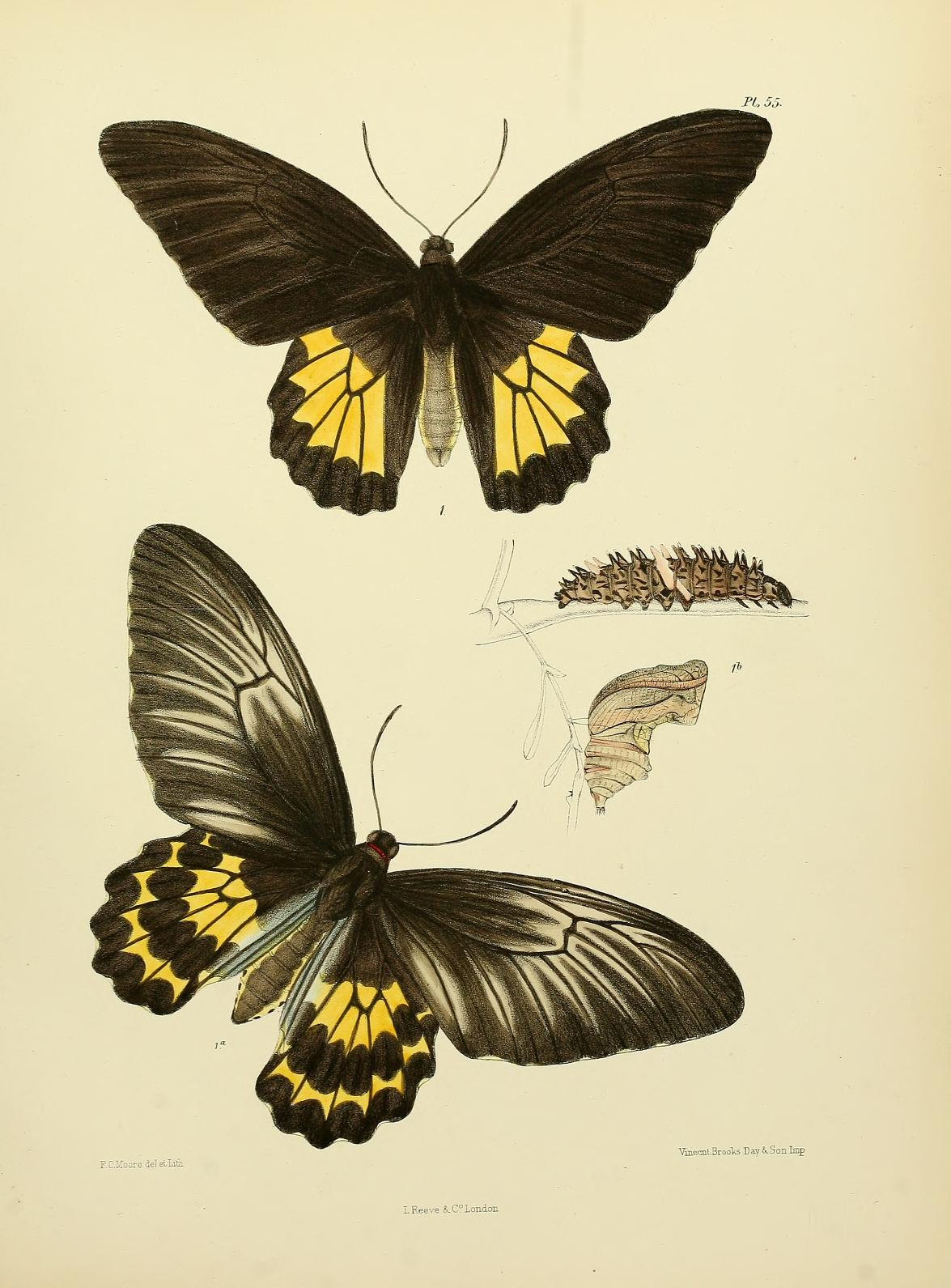
Plate from Frederic Moore's The Lepidoptera of Ceylon showing male and female imagines, larva and pupa

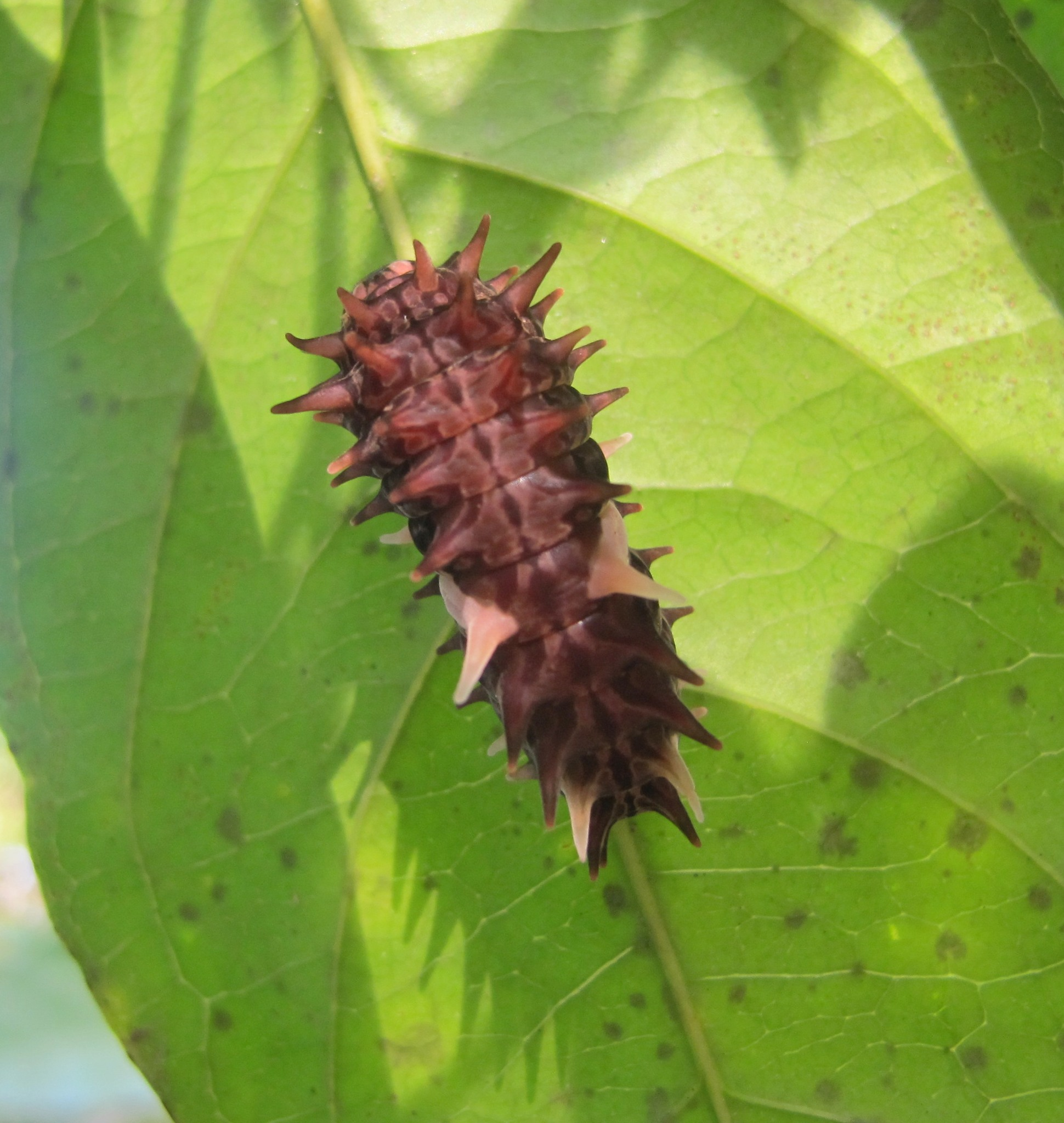
larva

== Life cycle ==
=== Larva ===
Cylindrical, dull purple brown, with two dorsal rows and anterior and lateral rows of fleshy tubercles, those on the eighth segment and a streak from its base to lower end of seventh segment being pale pink; between the tubercles are dark brown streaks. Feeds on Aristolochia (Moore.)

=== Pupa ===
Pale purplish ochreous, bent backwards anteriorly; thorax conical, the top flattened and its sides angled; wing cases dilated and flattened laterally in the middle, their outer edge acute; two middle segments of abdomen with a dorsal pair of conical prominences. (Moore.)

== Habitat ==
The primary habitat is thinly wooded mountain forests from sea-level up to an elevation of 2,000 metres. Occasionally observed in gardens but generally rare in lowlands.

== Threats ==
Troides darsius is threatened by deforestation.

== Related species ==
Troides darsius is a member of the Troides haliphron species group. The members of this clade are:

- Troides haliphron (Boisduval, 1836)
- Troides darsius (Gray, [1853])
- Troides vandepolli (Snellen, 1890)
- Troides criton (C. & R. Felder, 1860)
- Troides riedeli (Kirsch, 1885)
- Troides plato (Wallace, 1865)
- Troides staudingeri (Röber, 1888)
