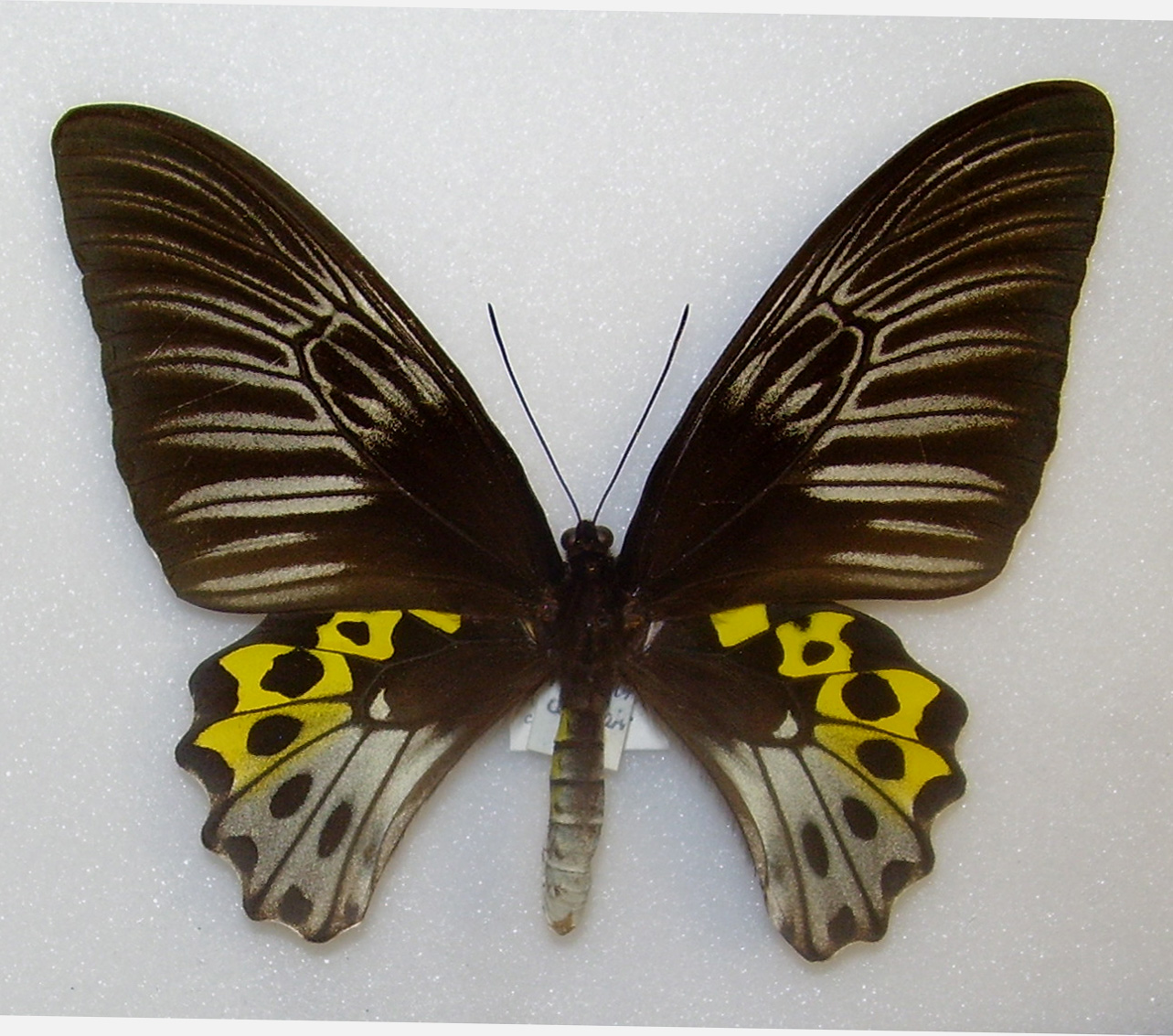
- T. h. cellularis - female, upperside
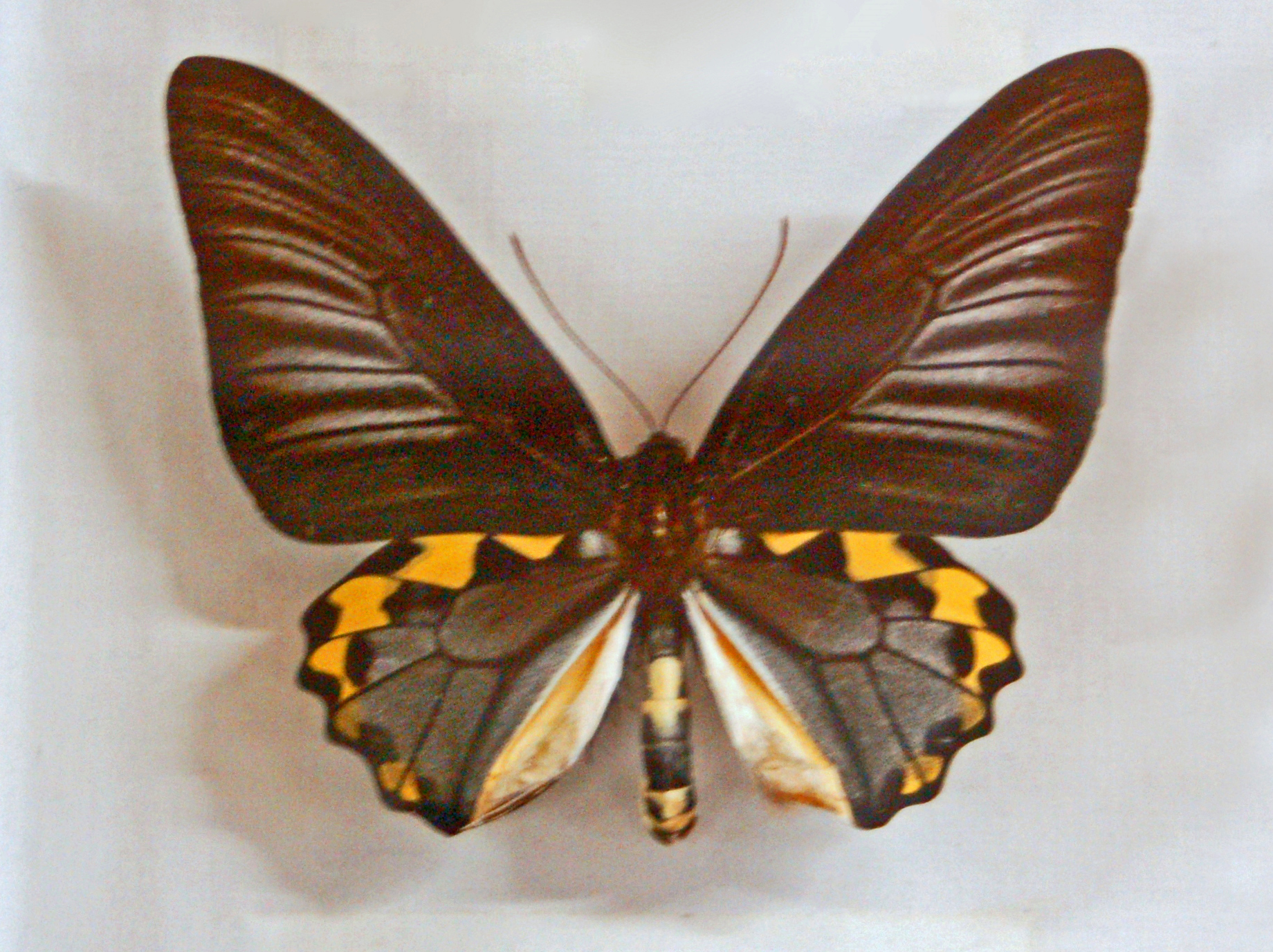
- Male, at National Museum (Prague)

Conservation status
- CITES Appendix II (CITES)

Scientific classification
- Kingdom: Animalia
- Phylum: Arthropoda
- Class: Insecta
- Order: Lepidoptera
- Family: Papilionidae
- Genus: Troides
- Species: T. hypolitus

Binomial name
- Troides hypolitus (Cramer, 1775)

Synonyms
- Papilio hypolitus Cramer, [1775]; Ripponia hypolitus; Papilio remus C. & R. Felder, 1864; Ornithoptera hypolitus var. sulaensis Staudinger, 1895

= Troides hypolitus =

Rippon's birdwing

Species of butterfly

Troides hypolitus, the Rippon's birdwing, is a birdwing butterfly endemic to the Moluccas and Sulawesi. It is not significantly threatened, but it is protected.

Troides hypolitus is a butterfly from the Australasian and Indomalayan realms. The first description was in 1775 by Pieter Cramer. This butterfly is a member of the family Papilionidae. Troides hypolitus is black. It has a chain of golden spots on the hindwings. The females are dark brown and they are bigger than the males.

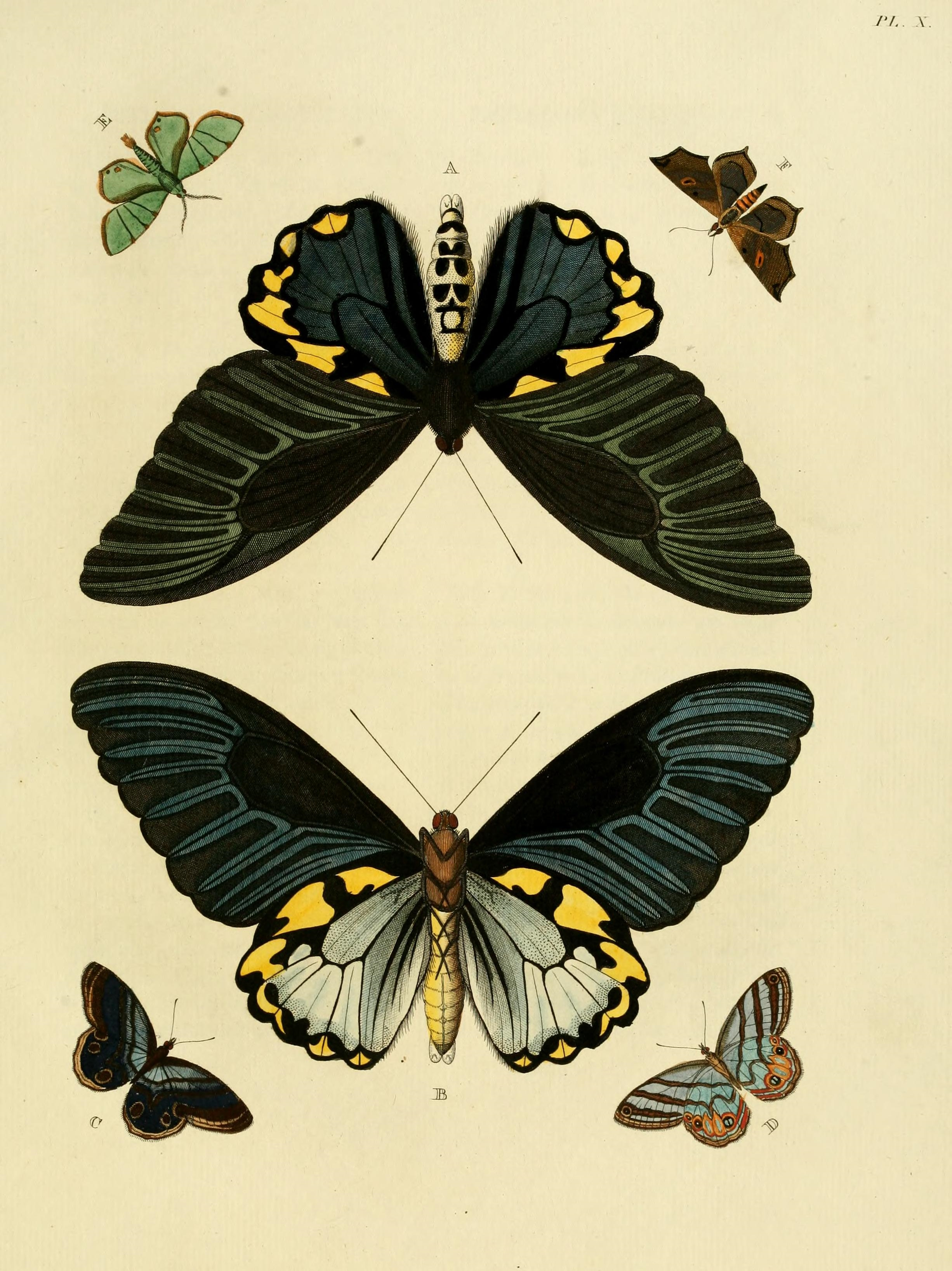
Original figure in Uitlandsche Kapellen

== Description ==
The wingspan is from 180 to 200 mm.

The male's forewings are black. Some veins are bordered by white colour. The underside is very similar to the upperside. The hindwings are grey. The outer edge is black and it contains a chain of golden spots. The veins are black. The underside is similar to the upperside, but the basic colour is white.

The body (abdomen) is black and yellow, but the underside is white and yellowish. It looks like a wasp. Head and thorax are black. The nape has a red hair-coat.

The sexes are sexually dimorphic. The female covers the upper range of the wingspan and is usually larger than the male. The basic colour of the female is dark brown. Many veins are bordered by white. The golden spots are bigger and they contain a black core. The underside is a very similar to the upperside.

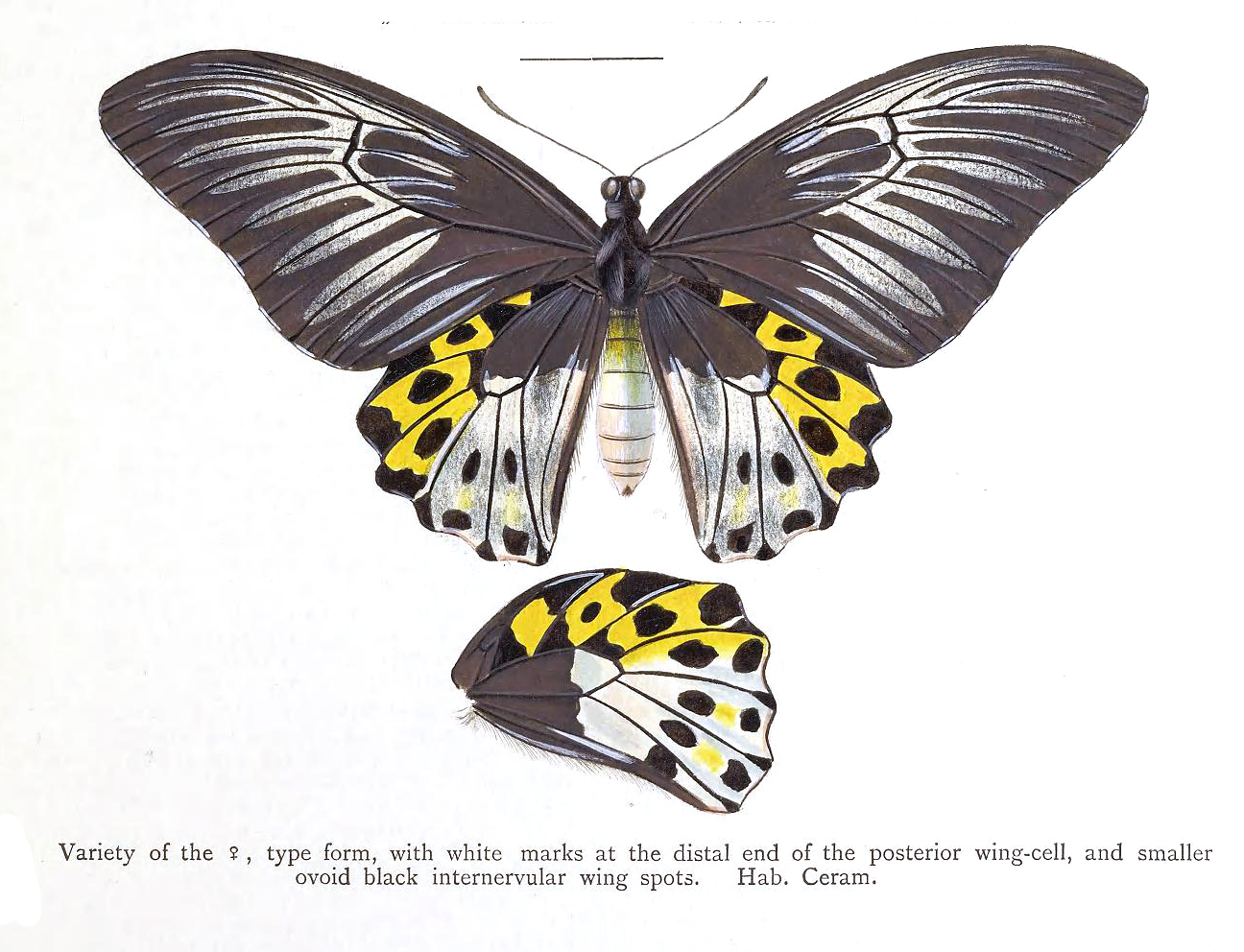
As Ornithoptera hippolytus in Robert Henry Fernando Rippon Icones Ornithopterorum (1898 to 1906)

== Distribution ==
Troides hypolitus is found in the Australasia and Indomalayan realms. The distribution is restricted on the Molucca Islands and Sulawesi.

== Subspecies ==
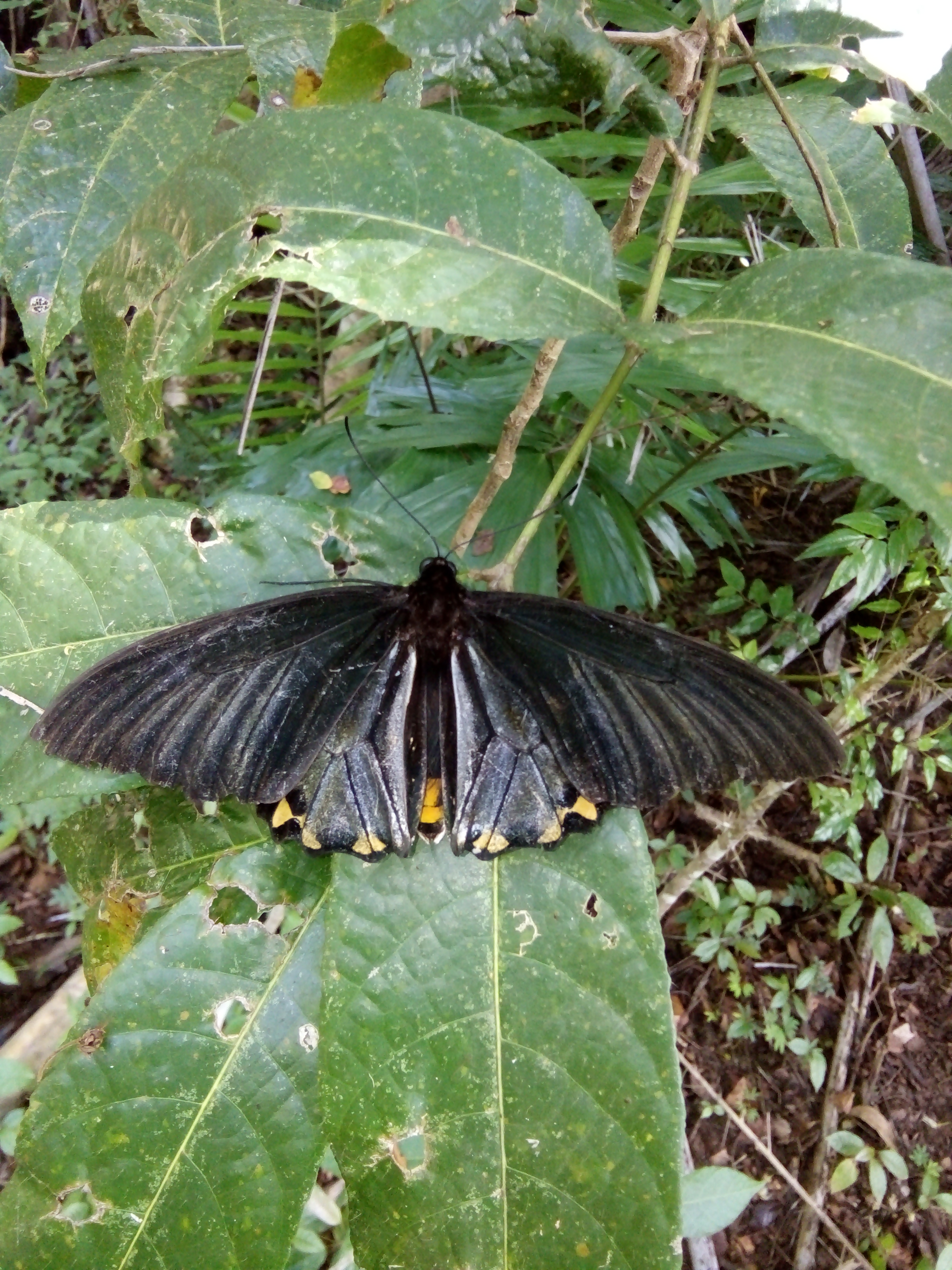
from Sungai Pontolo, North Gorontalo

There are four subspecies:

- Troides hypolitus hypolitus (Moluccas)
- Troides hypolitus antiope Rothschild, 1908 (Morotai)
- Troides hypolitus cellularis Rothschild, 1895 (Sulawesi, Talaud)
- Troides hypolitus sulaensis (Staudinger, 1895) (Sula Islands)

== Conservation ==
This butterfly is strictly protected. It is listed in the appendix II from CITES.

== Etymology ==
In Greek mythology Hippolytus was the son of Theseus.
