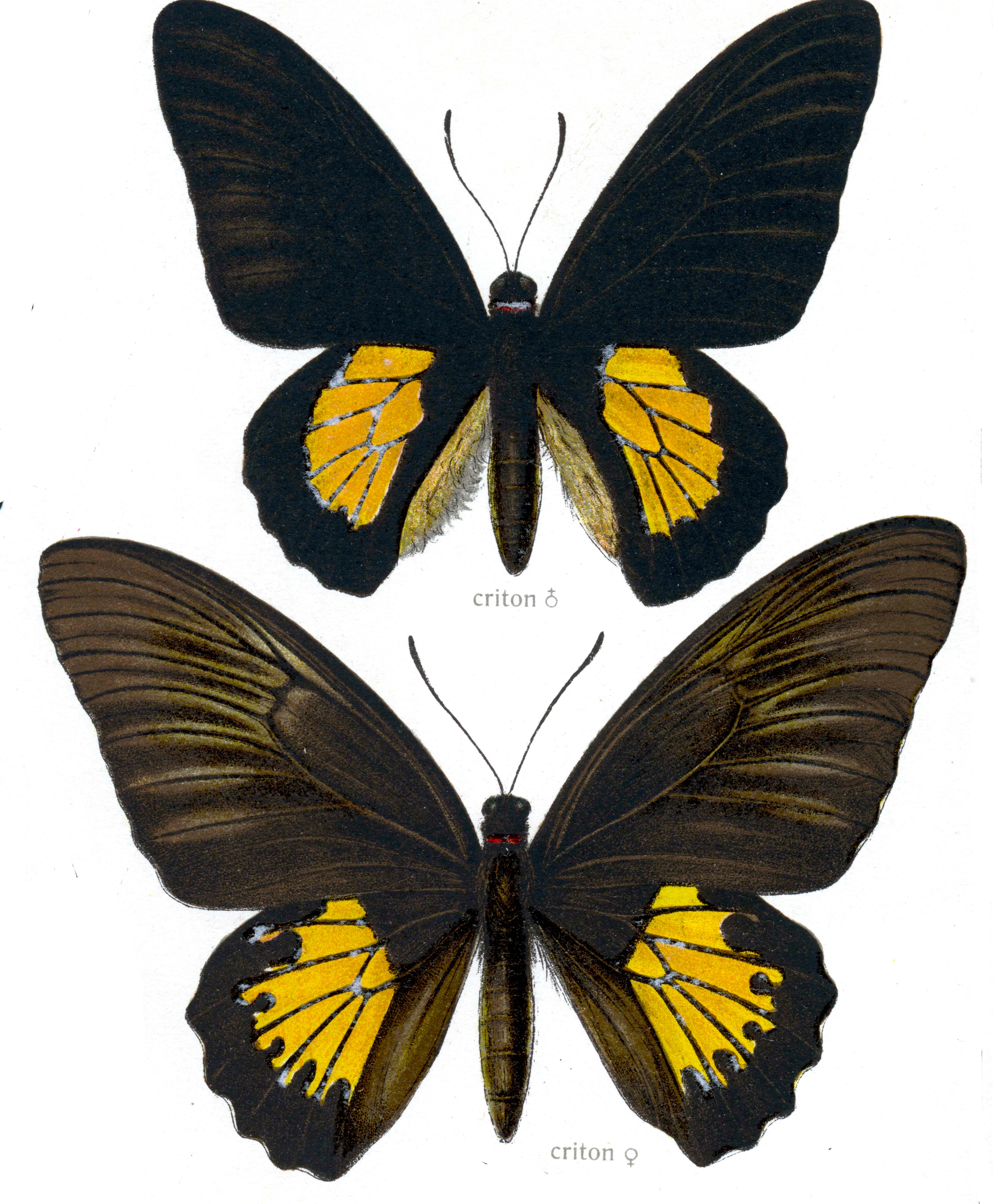
- Male (above) and female

Conservation status
- Least Concern (IUCN 3.1)
- CITES Appendix II

Scientific classification
- Kingdom: Animalia
- Phylum: Arthropoda
- Clade: Pancrustacea
- Class: Insecta
- Order: Lepidoptera
- Family: Papilionidae
- Genus: Troides
- Species: T. criton

Binomial name
- Troides criton Felder, 1860

= Troides criton =

Criton birdwing

Species of butterfly

Troides criton, the Criton birdwing, is a birdwing butterfly found on the islands of Morotai, Halmahera, Bali, Bacan, Ternate and Obi in Indonesia.

== Description ==
Troides criton is sexually dimorphic.

Male: The ground colour of the forewings is black. A large discal golden area has veins are black veins. The underside is very similar.

Female: In the female some of the veins are bordered by white. There is a chain of internervular black spots in the golden area. The underside is very similar.

In both sexes the abdomen is brown with a yellow underside. The head and thorax are black and the underside of thorax has red hair.

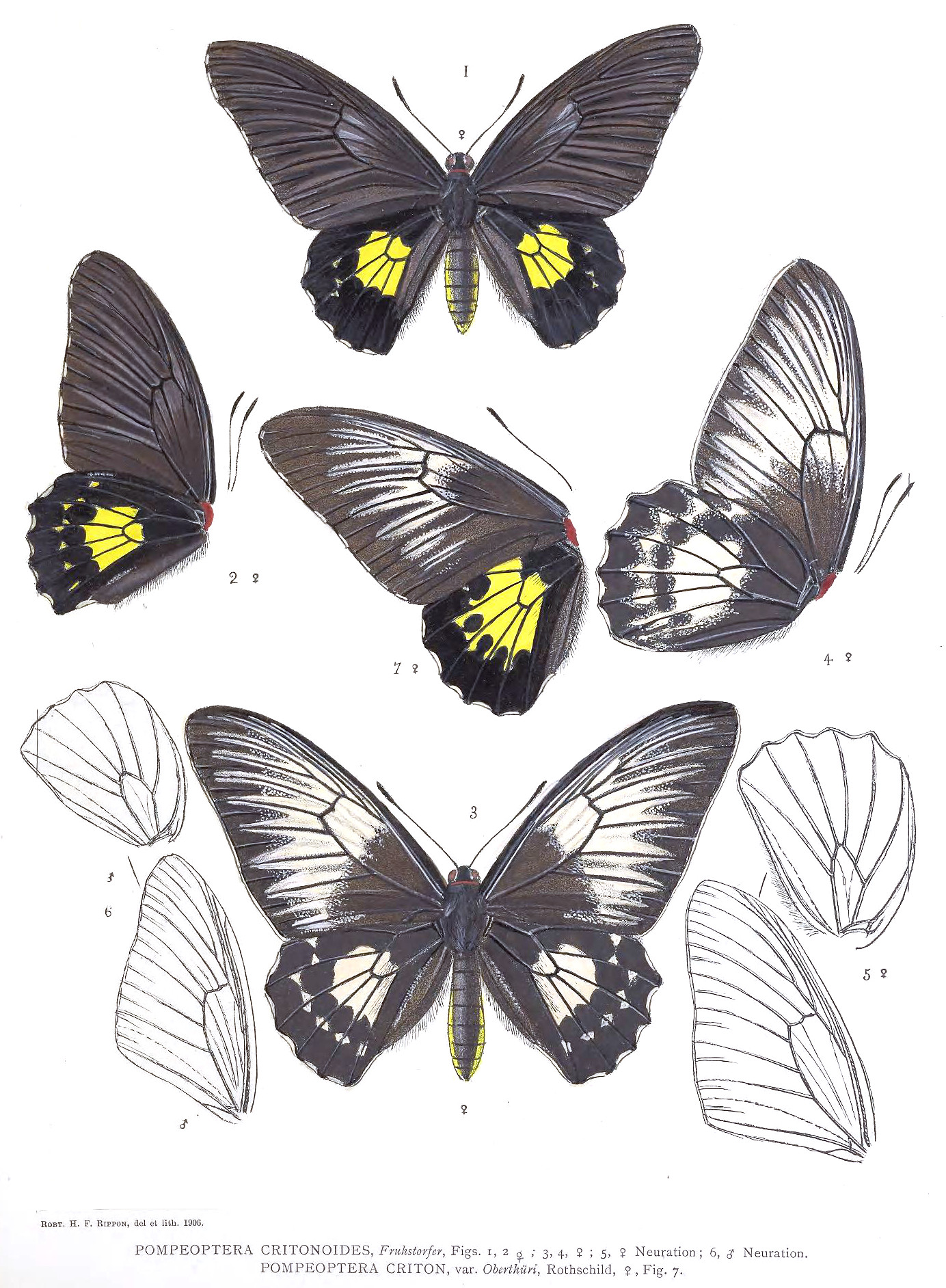

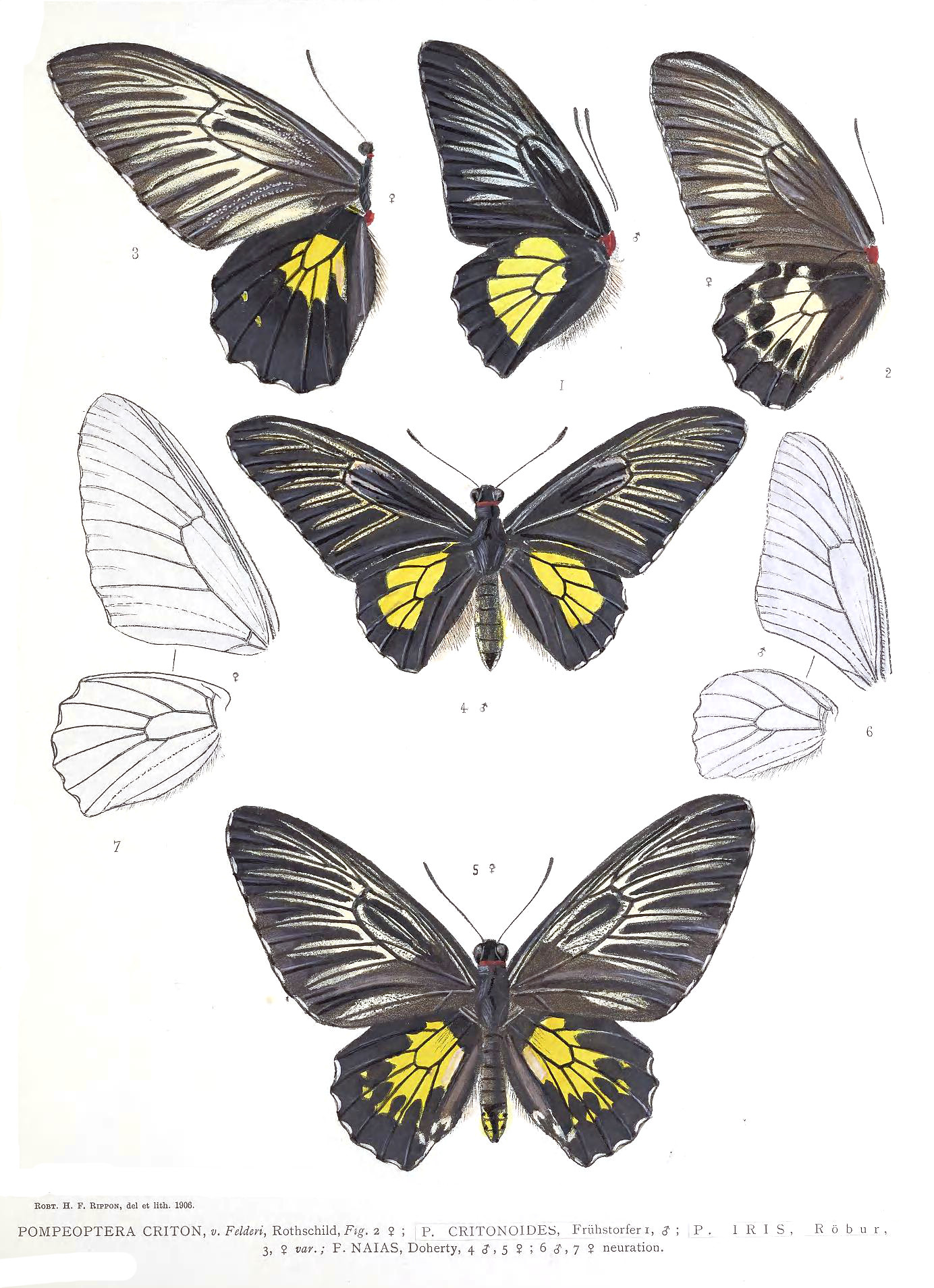

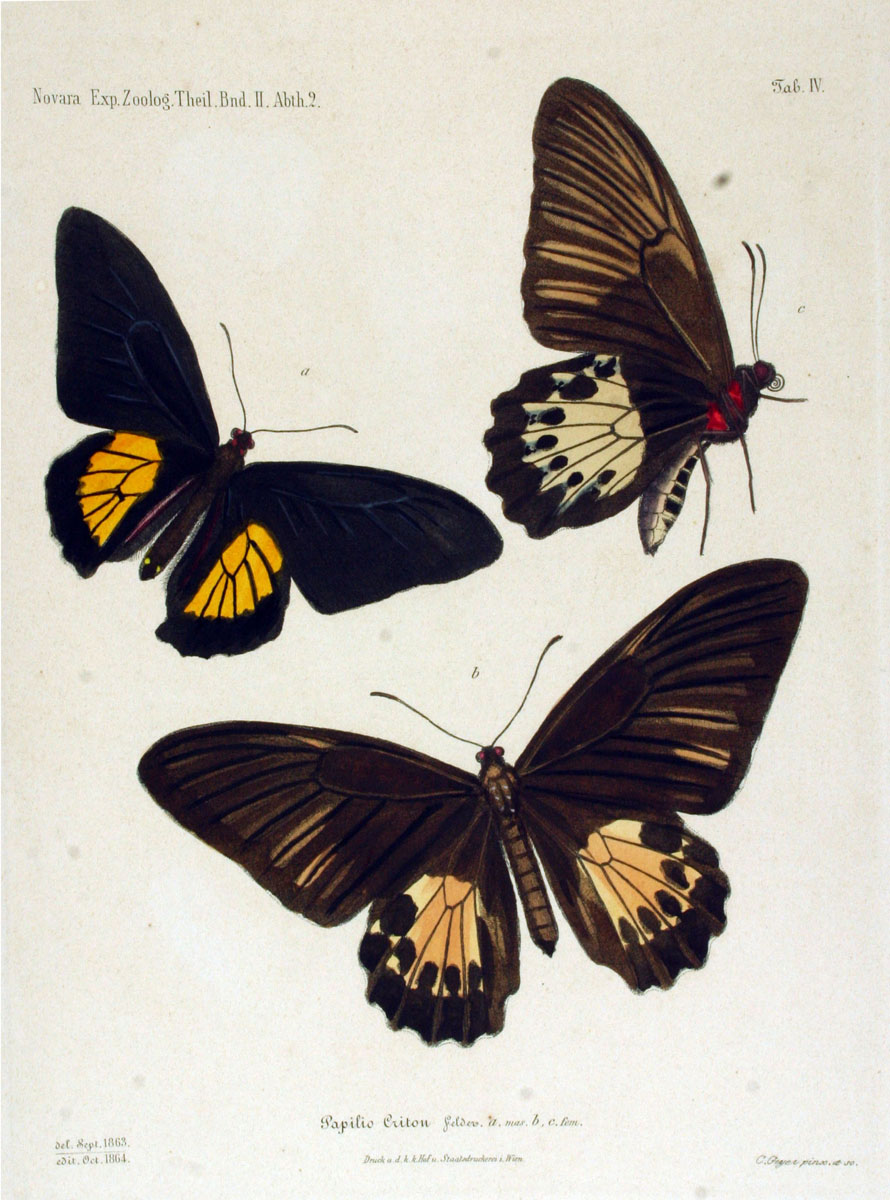

== Subspecies ==
- Troides criton criton Sulawesi, Moluccas, Morotai, Ternate, Tidore, Halmahera, Kasiruta, Sula Islands, Bacan
- Troides criton critonides (Fruhstorfer, 1903) Obi Islands Not constantly different from criton.Male: forewing beneath often with white vein-stripes (in 4 of our 7 males (Fruhstorfers) the cell-spot of the hindwing mostly less obliquely truncate than in criton. In the female the spot placed before the 1st radial of the hindwing always small, no yellow or cream-coloured discal spot before the subcostal; the black discal spots completely merged together, so that above only quite small yellow submarginal spots are present.

== Related species ==
Troides criton is a member of the Troides haliphron species group. The members of this clade are:

- Troides haliphron (Boisduval, 1836)
- Troides darsius (Gray, [1853])
- Troides vandepolli (Snellen, 1890)
- Troides criton (C. & R. Felder, 1860)
- Troides riedeli (Kirsch, 1885)
- Troides plato (Wallace, 1865)
- Troides staudingeri (Röber, 1888)
