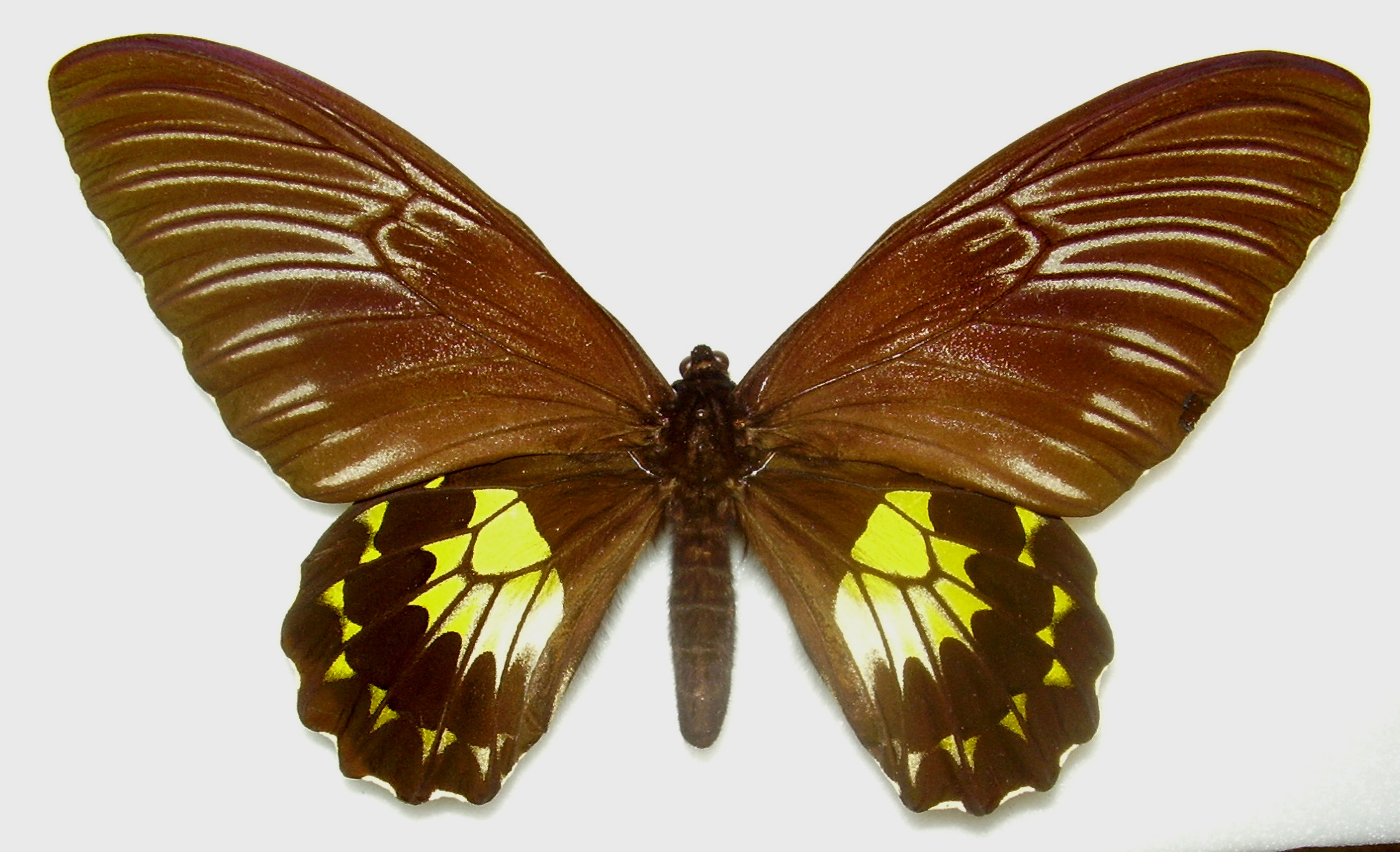
- female from Sumatra 6,000 ft altitude

Conservation status
- CITES Appendix II

Scientific classification
- Kingdom: Animalia
- Phylum: Arthropoda
- Clade: Pancrustacea
- Class: Insecta
- Order: Lepidoptera
- Family: Papilionidae
- Genus: Troides
- Species: T. vandepolli

Binomial name
- Troides vandepolli Snellen, 1890

= Troides vandepolli =

Van de Poll's birdwing

Species of butterfly

Troides vandepolli, the van de Poll's birdwing, is a montane birdwing butterfly occurring on Java and Sumatra. It is endemic for Indonesia and is protected by the Convention on International Trade in Endangered Species (CITES).

The species was named for Jacob R. H. Neervoort van de Poll.

== Description ==
Troides vandepolli is sexually dimorphic.

Male: The forewings' ground colour is black. The veins are lightly bordered by white. The underside of the forewings is dark brown. The veins are bordered by white. The hindwings are black. There is a large golden-yellow area in the discal and postdiscal part. The veins are black and they cleave the golden area.

The underside is similar to the upperside. At the inner edge there is a yellowish spot.

The abdomen is brown, the underside is yellow and black. Head and thorax are black. The nape has a red hair coat.

Female: The female is larger than the male. The ground colour of the female is brown. The veins are bordered by white. There is a yellow area with dark veins on the hindwings only and a chain of black spots in the yellow area. The underside is similar to the upperside.

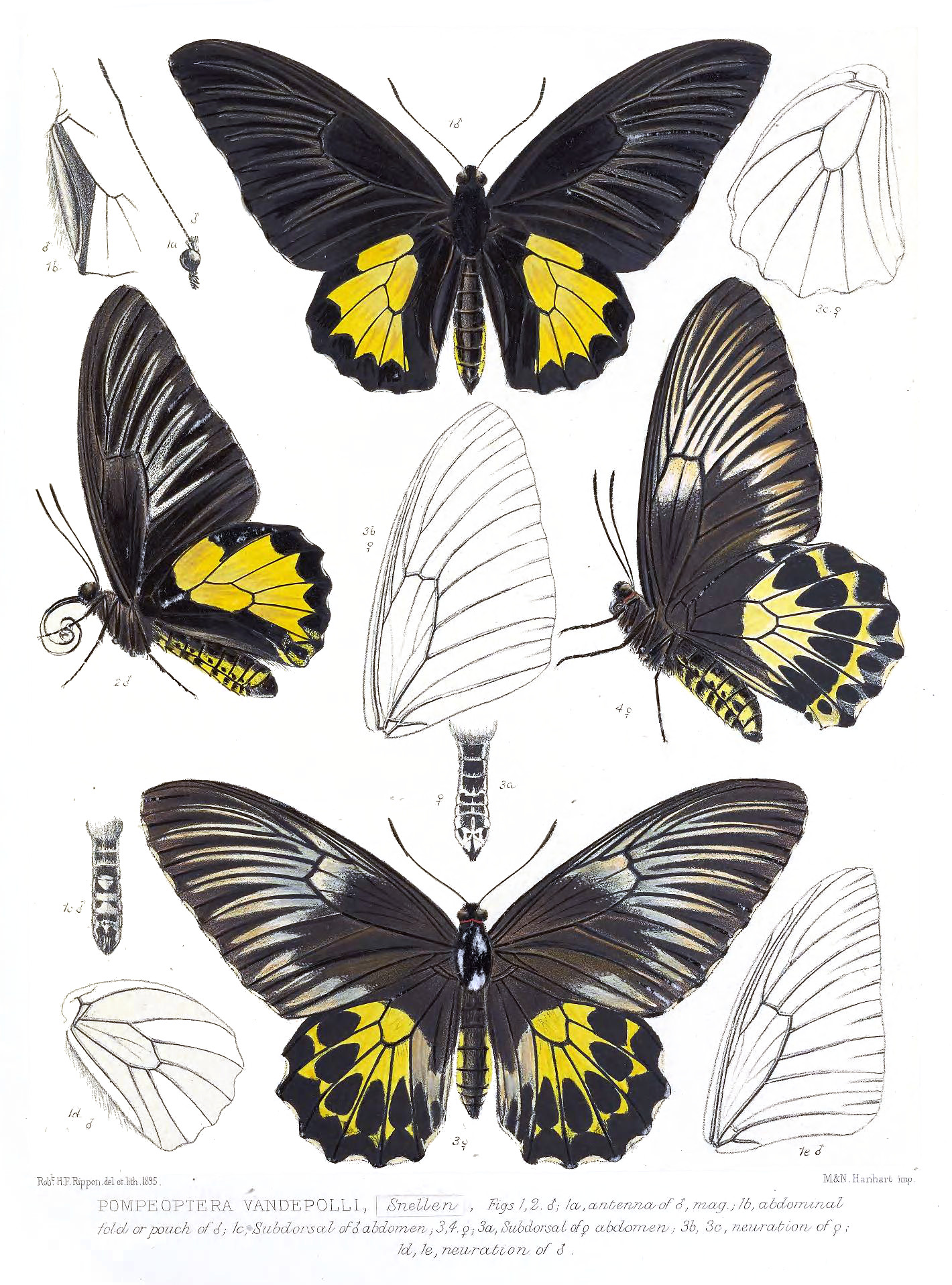

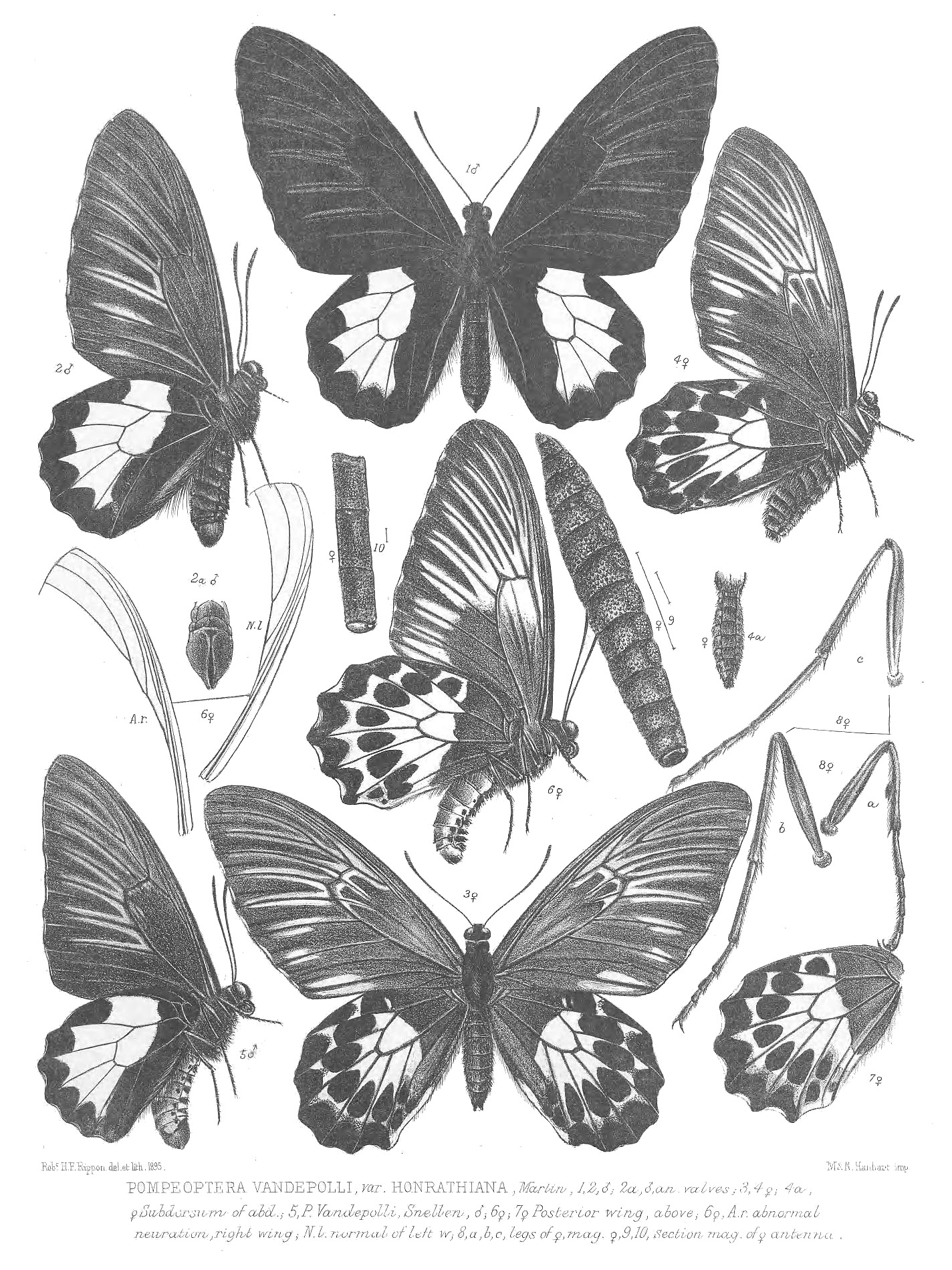

== Taxonomy ==
There are three subspecies, the nominate, honrathiana Martin, 1892 (montane plateau of Sumatra) and parrottei Deslisle, 1989 (S. Sumatra; Mt Dempo). They are named for Eduard Honrath and R.E.Parrott.

== Biogeographic realm ==
Indomalayan realm (Sundaland).

== Related species ==
Troides vandepolli is a member of the Troides haliphron species group. The members of this clade are:

- Troides haliphron (Boisduval, 1836)
- Troides darsius (Gray, [1853])
- Troides vandepolli (Snellen, 1890)
- Troides criton (C. & R. Felder, 1860)
- Troides riedeli (Kirsch, 1885)
- Troides plato (Wallace, 1865)
- Troides staudingeri (Röber, 1888)
