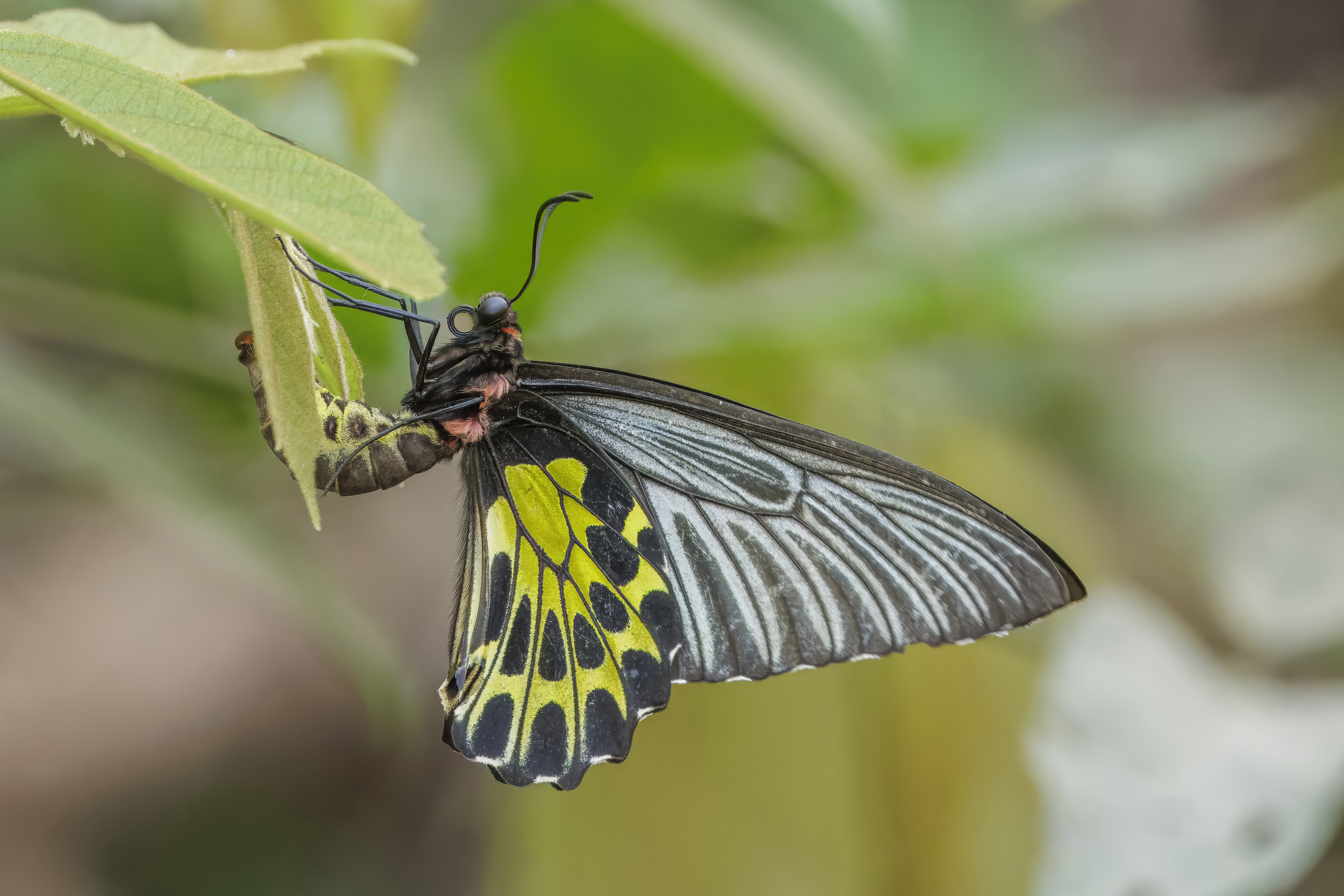
- Golden birdwing (T. aeacus) female

Scientific classification
- Kingdom: Animalia
- Phylum: Arthropoda
- Class: Insecta
- Order: Lepidoptera
- Family: Papilionidae
- Tribe: Troidini
- Genus: Troides; Hübner, 1819

Type species
- Papilio helena Linnaeus, 1758

= Troides =

Butterfly genus

Troides is a genus of birdwing butterflies, comprising species found in the Indian subcontinent, southeast Asia, and Oceania.

== Species ==
Twenty one species are recognized:

subgenus: Ripponia

- Troides hypolitus – Rippon's birdwing

subgenus: Troides

species group: Troides aeacus

- Troides aeacus – golden birdwing
- Troides dohertyi – Talaud black birdwing
- Troides magellanus – Magellan birdwing
- Troides minos – southern birdwing
- Troides plateni – Dr. Platen's birdwing
- Troides prattorum – Buru opalescent birdwing
- Troides rhadamantus – golden birdwing

species group: Troides amphrysus

- Troides amphrysus – Malay birdwing
- Troides andromache – Borneo birdwing
- Troides cuneifera
- Troides miranda – Miranda birdwing

species group: Troides haliphron

- Troides criton – Criton birdwing
- Troides darsius – Sri Lankan birdwing
- Troides haliphron – haliphron birdwing
- Troides plato – silver birdwing
- Troides riedeli – Riedel's birdwing
- Troides staudingeri
- Troides vandepolli – van de Poll's birdwing

species group: Troides helena

- Troides helena – common birdwing
- Troides oblongomaculatus – oblong-spotted birdwing
