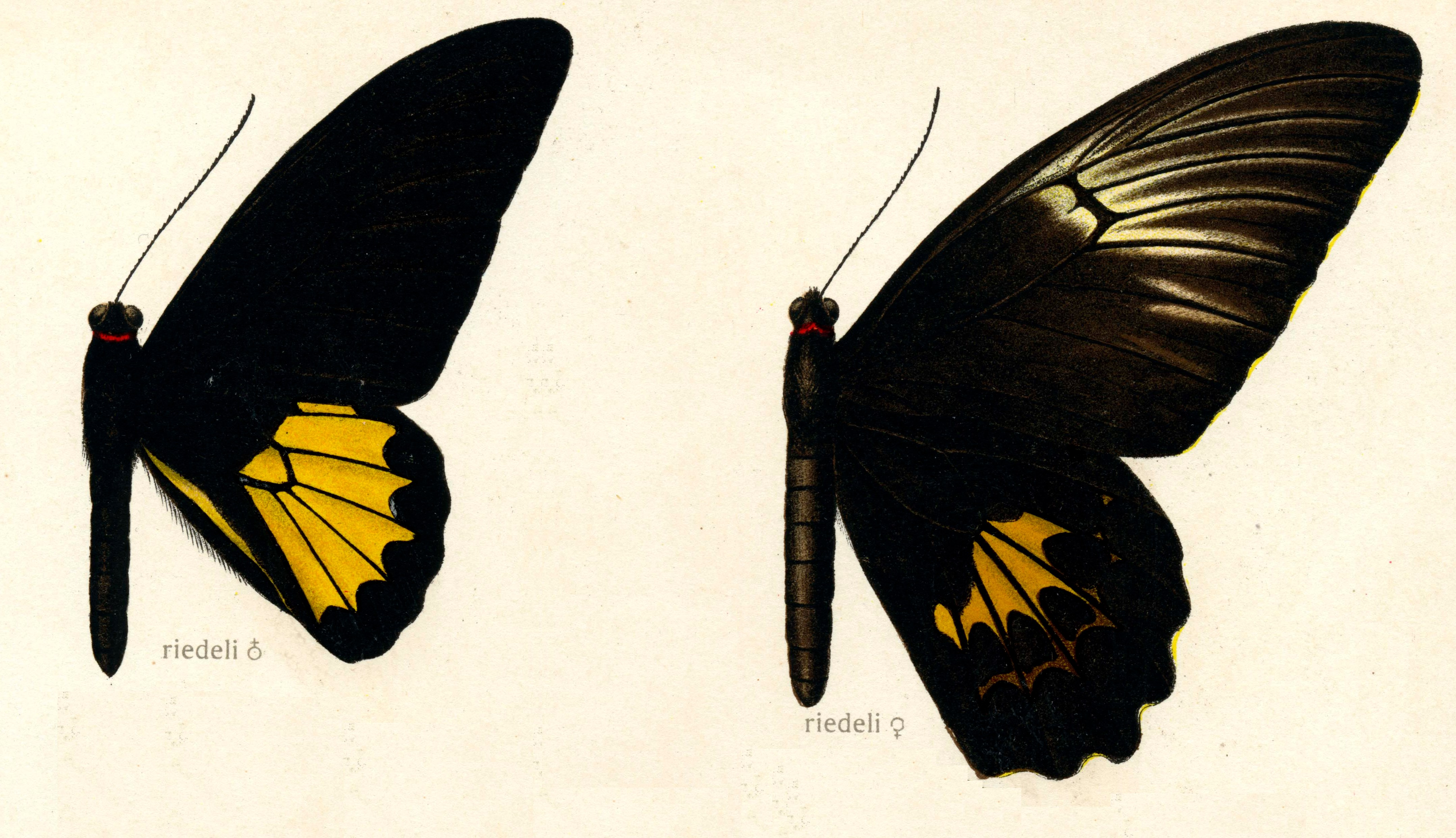

Conservation status
- Near Threatened (IUCN 3.1)
- CITES Appendix II

Scientific classification
- Kingdom: Animalia
- Phylum: Arthropoda
- Class: Insecta
- Order: Lepidoptera
- Family: Papilionidae
- Genus: Troides
- Species: T. riedeli

Binomial name
- Troides riedeli Kirsch, 1885

= Troides riedeli =

Riedel's birdwing

Species of butterfly

Troides riedeli, or Riedel's birdwing, is a birdwing butterfly endemic to the Tanimbar Islands, part of the Maluku Islands archipelago in Indonesia.

== Description ==
This apparently very constant species is one of the rarer forms. Body similar to that of criton, but the abdomen more sparsely yellow, especially at the sides; both wings more elongated than in the allied species.Male: forewing beneath with distinct but thin white vein-stripes, the pairs placed at the two median veins removed from the cell; the gold area of the hindwing much as in criton, but proximally cut off straight, the cell-spot much smaller, the posterior discal spots much longer and almost all the spots more deeply emarginate, the black hindmargin at the apex of the golden area and the black distal margin before the subcostal much narrower than in criton. Female : forewing at the apex of the cell and distally to it white, this area produced into stripes at the veins, at the 1. median a white double stripe, which is remote from the cell; hind-wing with dot-like cell-spot or the cell entirely black, 4 golden discal spots and behind this area a whitish grey spot; the black discal spots not completely merged together, but the yellow spots separated by them strongly scaled with black on the upper surface. — Sjerra, Timor Laut Islands, perhaps also on the other islands of this group.

== Biology ==
Very little is known of the life history and distribution.

== Biogeographic realm ==
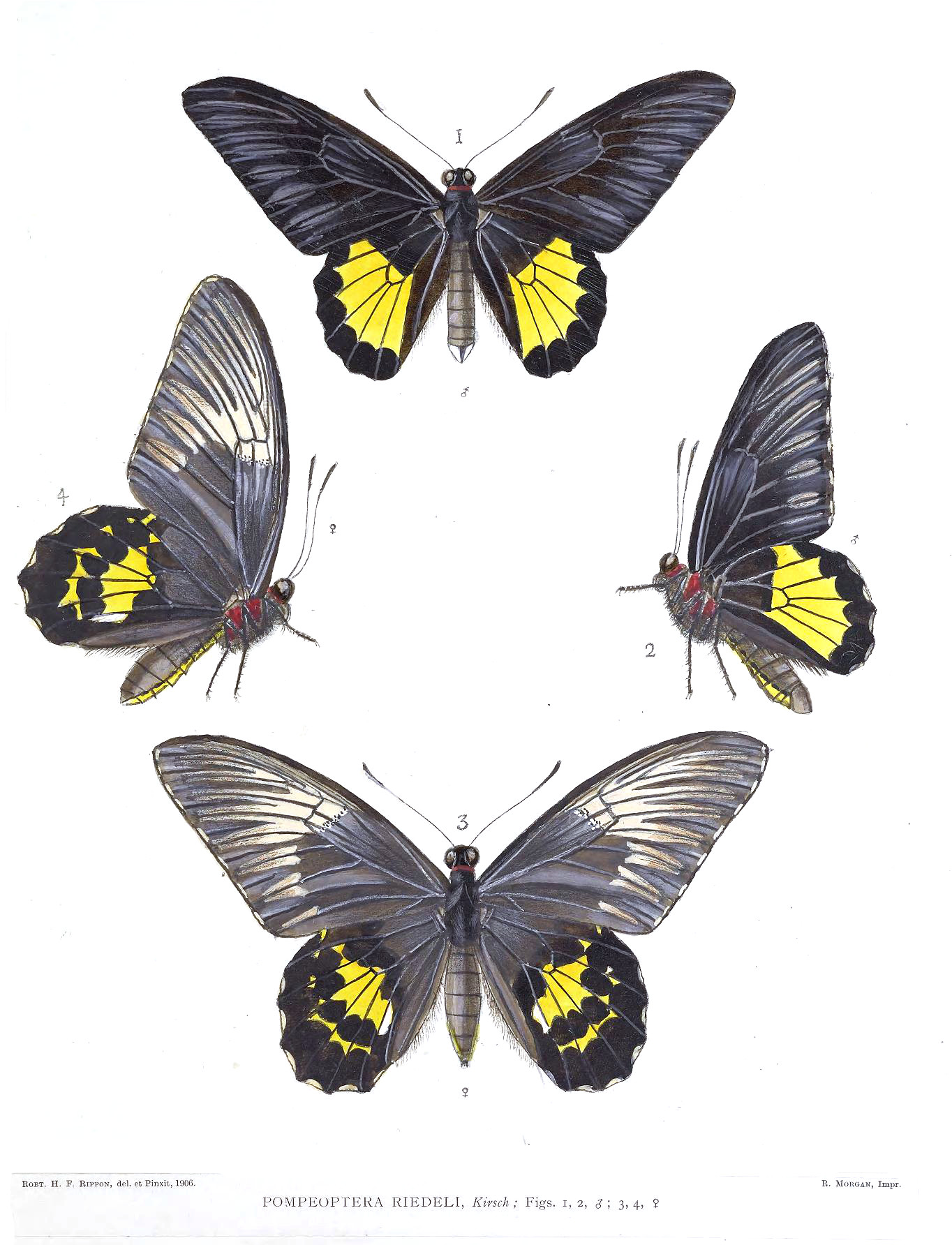
Plate from Icones Ornithopterorum

Australasian realm

== Related species ==
Troides riedeli is a member of the Troides haliphron species group. The members of this clade are:

- Troides haliphron (Boisduval, 1836)
- Troides darsius (Gray, [1853])
- Troides vandepolli (Snellen, 1890)
- Troides criton (C. & R. Felder, 1860)
- Troides riedeli (Kirsch, 1885)
- Troides plato (Wallace, 1865)
- Troides staudingeri (Röber, 1888)
