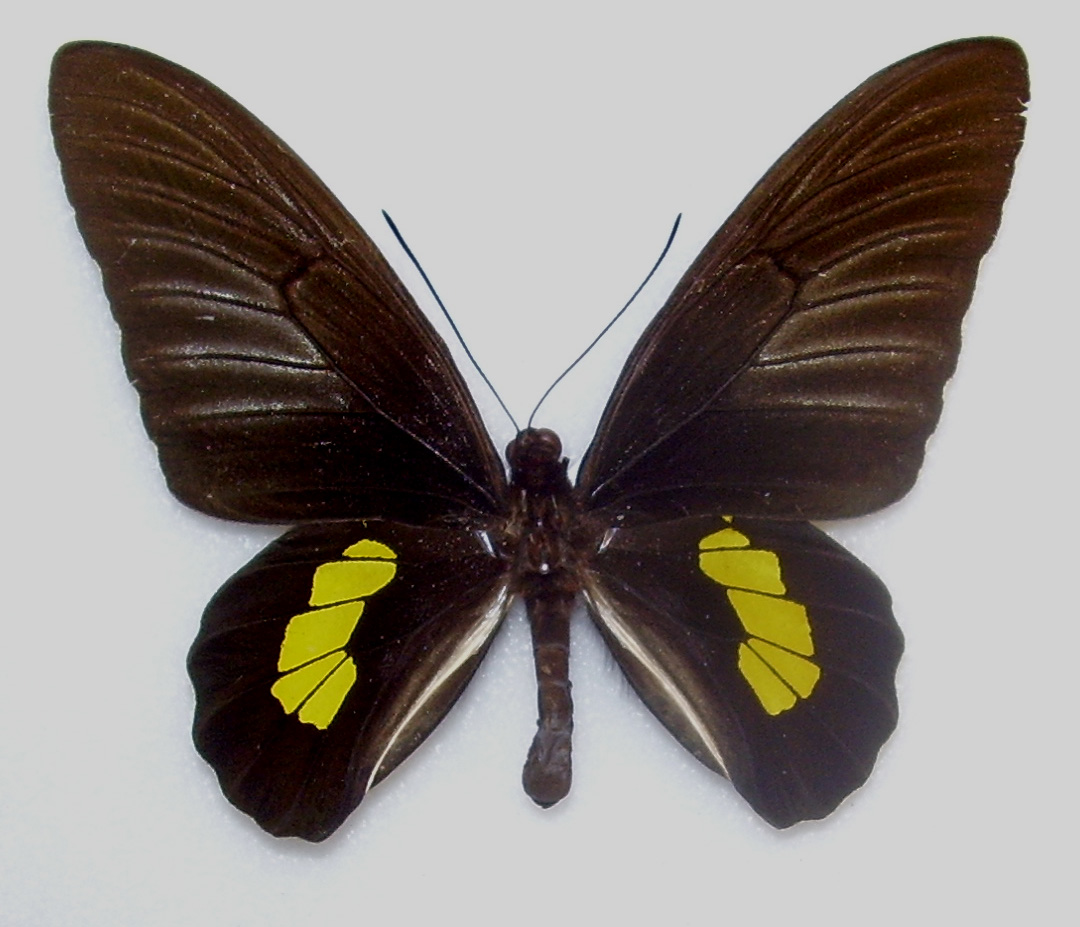
- Male, upperside

Conservation status
- CITES Appendix II

Scientific classification
- Kingdom: Animalia
- Phylum: Arthropoda
- Class: Insecta
- Order: Lepidoptera
- Family: Papilionidae
- Genus: Troides
- Species: T. haliphron

Binomial name
- Troides haliphron (Boisduval), 1836

= Troides haliphron =

Haliphron birdwing

Species of butterfly

Troides haliphron, the haliphron birdwing, is a birdwing butterfly confined to Sulawesi and the lesser Sunda Islands.

== Description ==
Troides haliphron is sexually dimorphic.

Male: The forewings are ground colour black. The veins are bordered by white shading. The hindwings are ground colour black. There is a golden band in the discal area of the wing. The veins are black and they cleave the golden area. The underside is similar.

Female: The female is larger than the male. The ground colour of the female is brown. The veins are bordered by white shading. There is a yellow area with dark veins on the hindwings. There is one chain of black spots is in the yellow area. The underside is similar.

The abdomen is dark brown, and the underside has yellow spots. Head and thorax are black. The nape has a red hair coat.

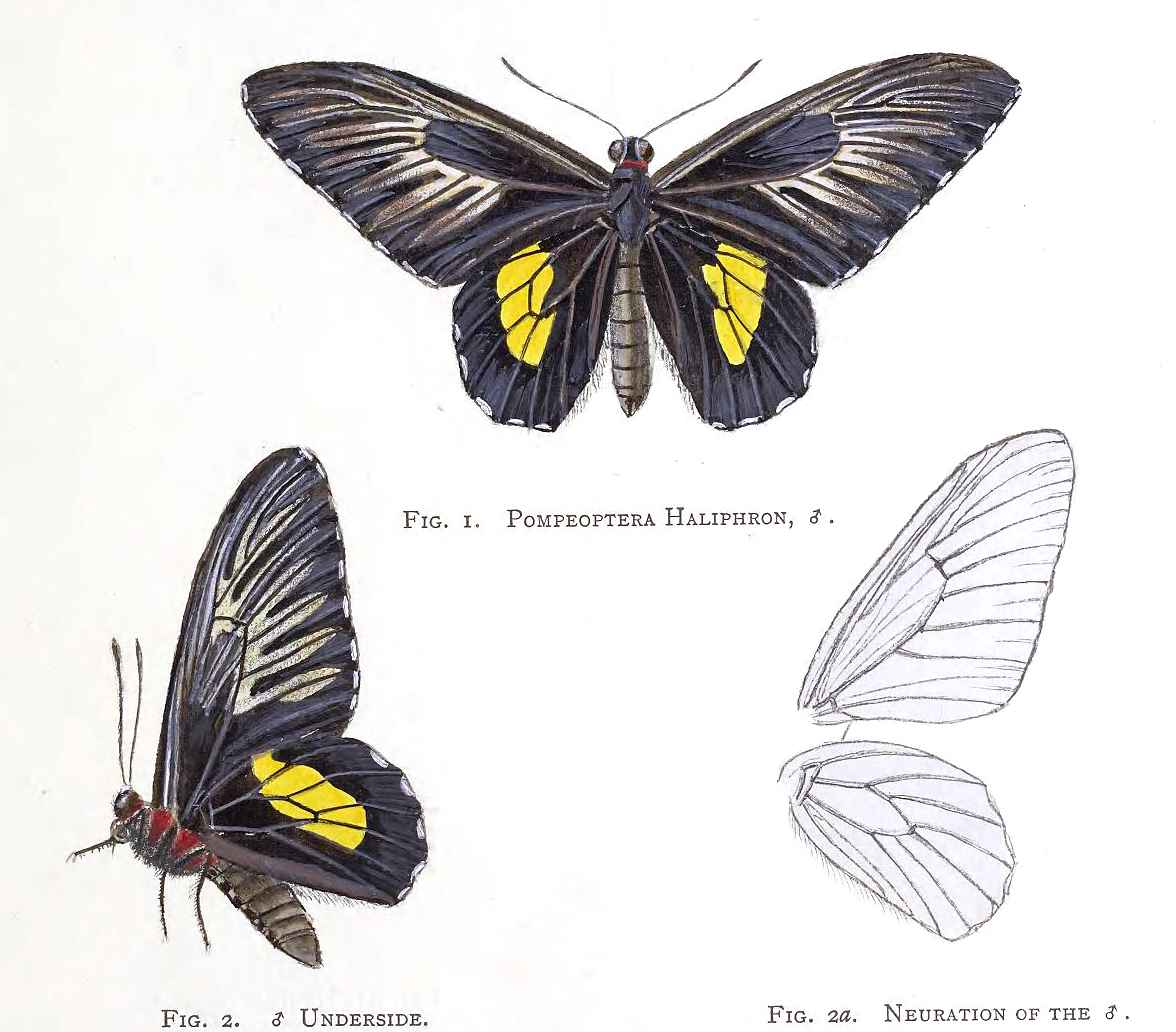

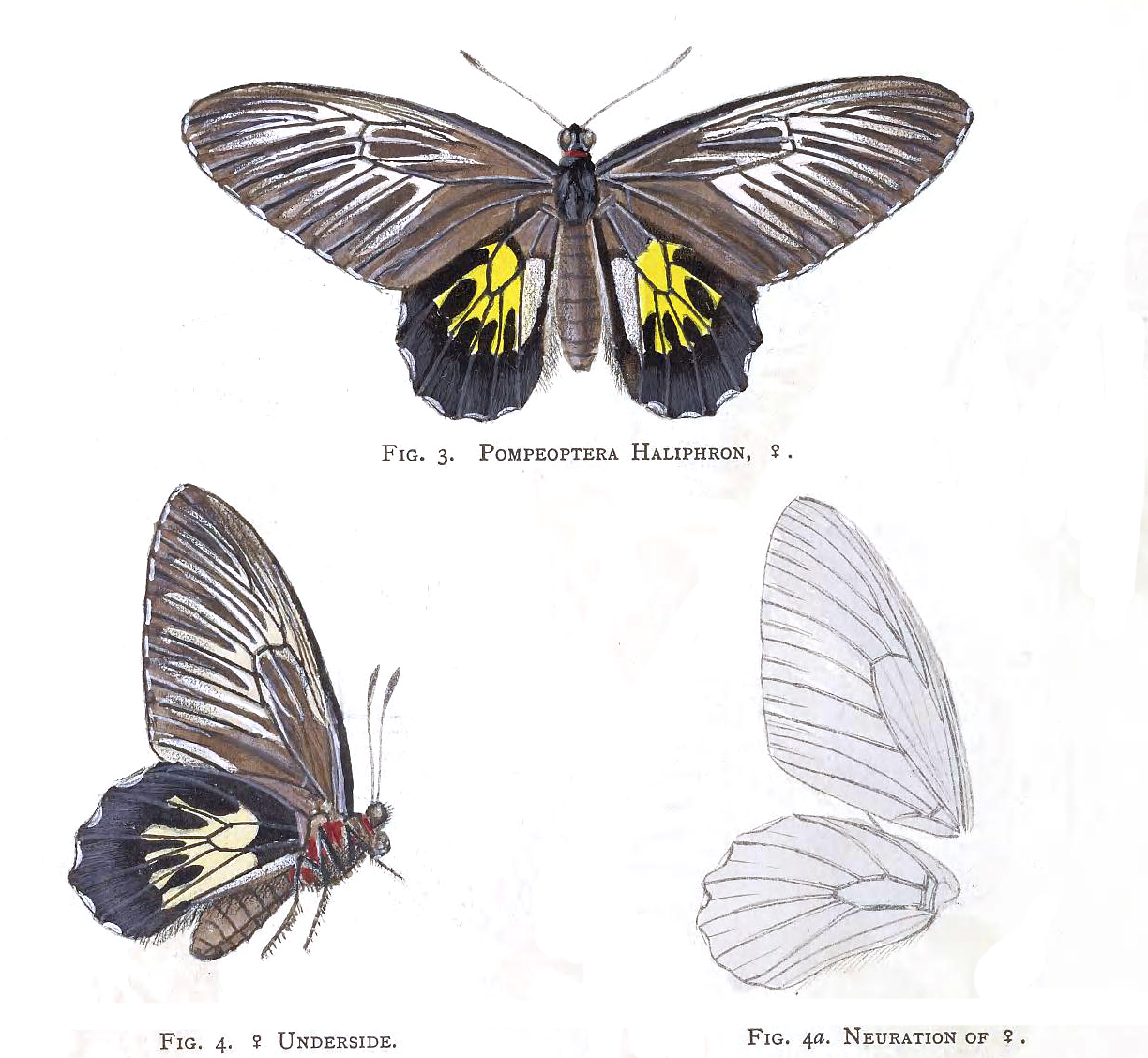

== Taxonomy ==
Troides staudingeri has at times been considered a subspecies of Troides haliphron.

Subspecies celebensis - the status of this taxon is uncertain. It has been placed within Troides criton, and Troides oblongomaculatus. It may be a hybrid with Troides helena hephaestus.

=== Subspecies ===
A number of other subspecies have been described from different islands. They are:

- Troides haliphron celebensis - possibly central Celebes (see Taxonomy)
- Troides haliphron haliphron - South Celebes
- Troides haliphron naias - Sumba
- Troides haliphron socrates - Wetar and Sumbawa (probably a local form and not a subspecies)
- Troides haliphron selayarensis - Selayar Islands

== Biology ==
The larva feeds on species Aristolochia.

== Related species ==
Troides haliphron is a member of the Troides haliphron species group. The members of this clade are:

- Troides haliphron (Boisduval, 1836)
- Troides darsius (Gray, [1853])
- Troides vandepolli (Snellen, 1890)
- Troides criton (C. & R. Felder, 1860)
- Troides riedeli (Kirsch, 1885)
- Troides plato (Wallace, 1865)
- Troides staudingeri (Röber, 1888)
