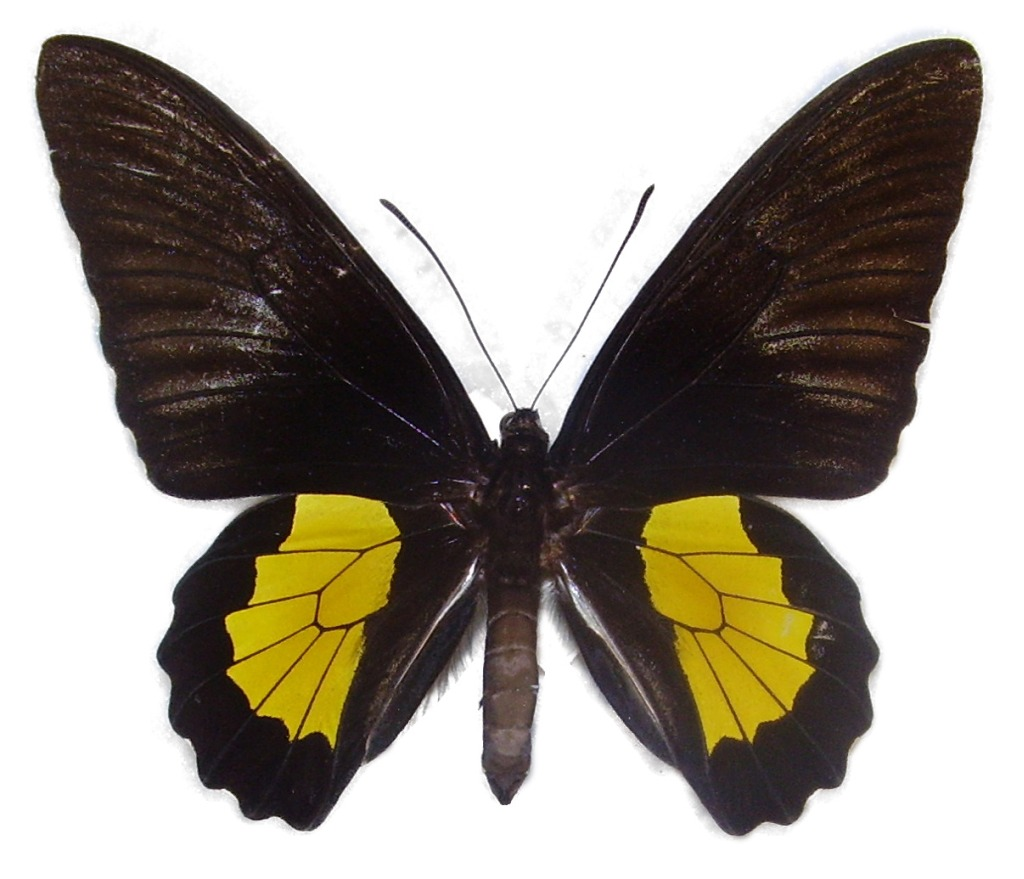
- Male, upperside

Conservation status
- CITES Appendix II

Scientific classification
- Kingdom: Animalia
- Phylum: Arthropoda
- Clade: Pancrustacea
- Class: Insecta
- Order: Lepidoptera
- Family: Papilionidae
- Genus: Troides
- Species: T. plato

Binomial name
- Troides plato Wallace, 1865

= Troides plato =

Silver birdwing

Species of butterfly

Troides plato, the silver birdwing, is a birdwing butterfly endemic to Timor. Troides plato is a butterfly with a large wingspan and scalloped hindwings. It exhibits sexual dimorphism.

The males have black forewings with veins discretely highlighted in white on the upper side, more broadly on the underside, and yellow hindwings veined and broadly edged in black.

The females have black forewings with veins largely outlined in white, except in the basal part, even more so on the reverse and the hindwings are yellow veined and broadly bordered in black, the border doubled by a submarginal line of large confluent black dots.

Described forms are nychonia Jordan, 1908 (male), chitonia Jordan, 1908 (male), and delormei Le Moult, 1931 (female).

== Taxonomy ==
Previously considered to be a subspecies of haliphron, plato was raised to a full species by Haugum and Low on the basis of differences in the genitalia.

== Biogeographic realm ==
Australasian realm.

== Related species ==
Troides plato is a member of the Troides haliphron species group. The members of this clade are:

- Troides haliphron (Boisduval, 1836)
- Troides darsius (Gray, [1853])
- Troides vandepolli (Snellen, 1890)
- Troides criton (C. & R. Felder, 1860)
- Troides riedeli (Kirsch, 1885)
- Troides plato (Wallace, 1865)
- Troides staudingeri (Röber, 1888)
