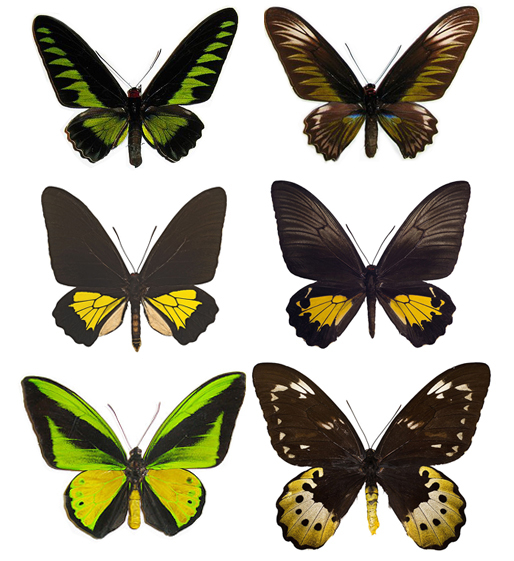
- Male (left) and female (right) representatives of Trogonoptera (top), Troides (middle), and Ornithoptera (bottom)

Scientific classification
- Kingdom: Animalia
- Phylum: Arthropoda
- Class: Insecta
- Order: Lepidoptera
- Family: Papilionidae
- Subfamily: Papilioninae
- Tribe: Troidini

Genera
- Trogonoptera Rippon, 1890; Troides Hübner, 1819; Ornithoptera Boisduval, 1832

= Birdwing =

Birdwings

Butterflies in swallowtail family

Birdwings are butterflies in the swallowtail family, that belong to the genera Trogonoptera, Troides, and Ornithoptera. Most recent authorities recognise 36 species, however, this is debated, and some authorities include additional genera. Birdwings are named for their exceptional size, angular wings, and birdlike flight. They are found across tropical Asia, mainland and archipelagic Southeast Asia, and Australasia.

Included among the birdwings are some of the largest butterflies in the world: the largest, Queen Alexandra's birdwing; the second largest, the Goliath birdwing; the largest butterfly endemic to Australia, the Cairns birdwing; and the largest butterfly in India, the southern birdwing. Another well-known species is Rajah Brooke's birdwing, a particularly attractive species and the national butterfly of Malaysia, named after Sir James Brooke, the first White Rajah of 19th-century Sarawak.

Due to their size and brightly coloured males, they are popular among collectors of butterflies, but all birdwings are now listed by CITES, thereby limiting (and in the case of O. alexandrae completely banning) international trade.

== Taxonomy ==
=== Genera and species ===
genus: Troides

subgenus: Ripponia

- Troides hypolitus – Rippon's birdwing

subgenus: Troides

species group: Troides aeacus

- Troides aeacus – golden birdwing
- Troides dohertyi – Talaud black birdwing
- Troides magellanus – Magellan birdwing
- Troides minos – southern birdwing
- Troides plateni – Dr. Platen's birdwing
- Troides prattorum – Buru opalescent birdwing
- Troides rhadamantus – golden birdwing

species group: Troides amphrysus

- Troides amphrysus – Malay birdwing
- Troides andromache – Borneo birdwing
- Troides cuneifera
- Troides miranda – Miranda birdwing

species group: Troides haliphron

- Troides criton – Criton birdwing
- Troides darsius – Sri Lankan birdwing
- Troides haliphron – haliphron birdwing
- Troides plato – silver birdwing
- Troides riedeli – Riedel's birdwing
- Troides staudingeri
- Troides vandepolli – van de Poll's birdwing

species group: Troides helena

- Troides helena – common birdwing
- Troides oblongomaculatus – oblong-spotted birdwing

genus: Trogonoptera

- Trogonoptera brookiana – Rajah Brooke's birdwing
- Trogonoptera trojana – Palawan birdwing

genus: Ornithoptera

subgenus: Aetheoptera

- Ornithoptera victoriae – Queen Victoria's birdwing

subgenus: Ornithoptera

- Ornithoptera aesacus – Obi Island birdwing
- Ornithoptera croesus – Wallace's golden birdwing
- Ornithoptera euphorion – Cairns birdwing
- Ornithoptera priamus – common green birdwing
- Ornithoptera richmondia – Richmond birdwing

subgenus: Schoenbergia

- Ornithoptera chimaera – chimaera birdwing
- Ornithoptera goliath – Goliath birdwing
- Ornithoptera meridionalis – southern tailed birdwing
- Ornithoptera paradisea – paradise birdwing
- Ornithoptera rothschildi – Rothschild's birdwing
- Ornithoptera tithonus – Tithonus birdwing

subgenus: Straatmana

- Ornithoptera alexandrae – Queen Alexandra's birdwing

=== Natural hybrids ===
- Troides prattorum × Troides oblongomaculatus bouruensis — Troides mixtum
- Ornithoptera rothschildi × Ornithoptera priamus poseidon — Ornithoptera akakeae
- Ornithoptera victoriae × Ornithoptera priamus urvillianus — Ornithoptera allotei

== Description ==
=== Ova ===
After mating, females immediately begin to seek appropriate host plants; climbing vines of the genera Aristolochia and Pararistolochia (both in the family Aristolochiaceae) are sought exclusively. The female lays her spherical eggs under the tips of the vine's leaves, one egg per leaf.

=== Larva ===
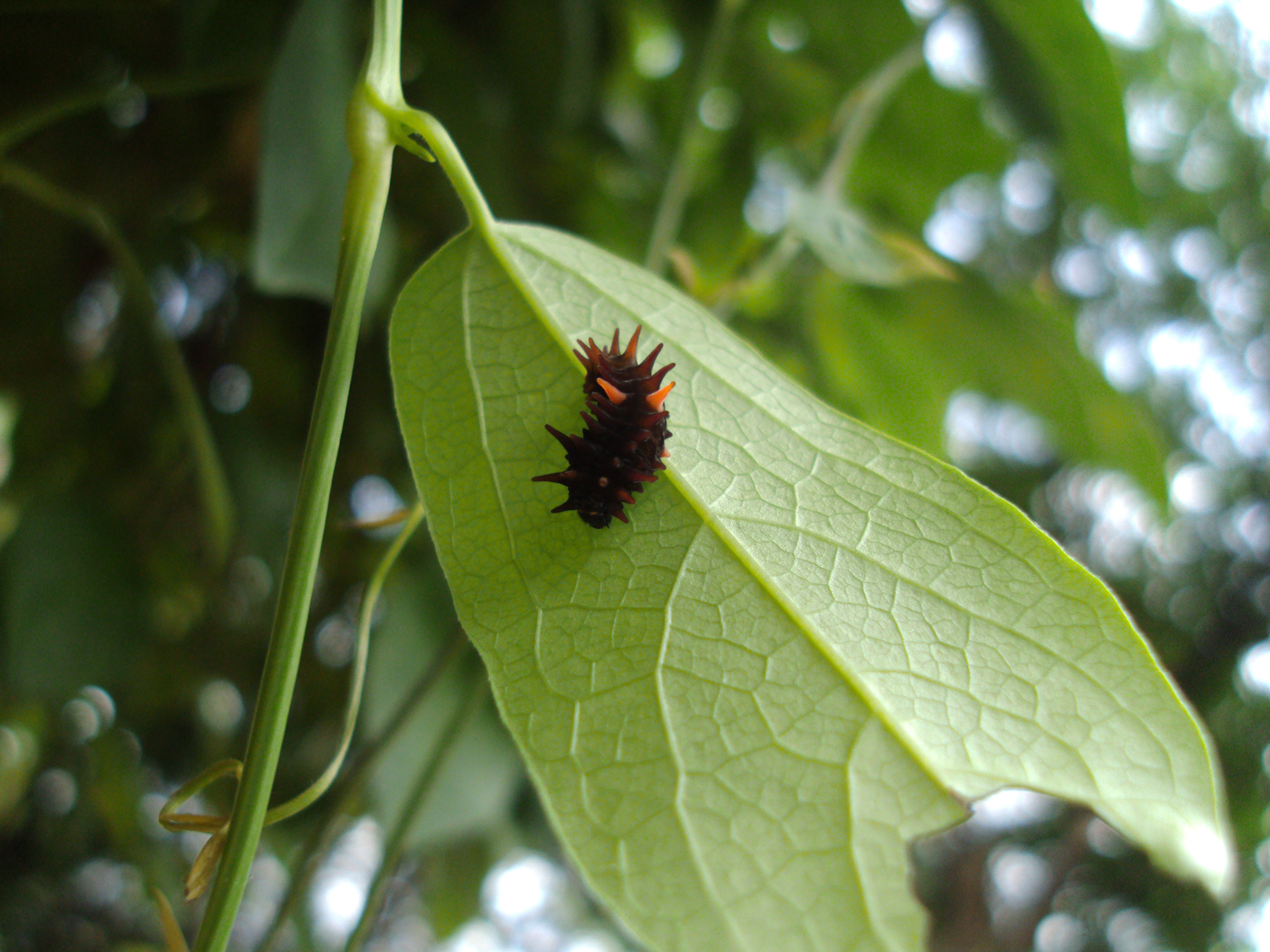
Early instar larva of Troides minos

The caterpillars are voracious eaters but move very little; a small group will defoliate an entire vine. If starved due to overcrowding, the caterpillars may resort to cannibalism. Fleshy spine-like tubercles line the caterpillars' backs, and their bodies are dark red to brown and velvety black. Some species have tubercles of contrasting colours, often red, or pale "saddle" markings. Like other members of their family, birdwing caterpillars possess a retractable organ behind their heads called an osmeterium. Shaped like the forked tongue of a snake, the osmeterium excretes a fetid terpene-based compound and is deployed when the caterpillar is provoked. The caterpillars are also unappealing to most predators due to their toxicity: the vines which the caterpillars feed upon contain aristolochic acid, a poisonous compound known to be carcinogenic in rats. The feeding caterpillars incorporate and concentrate the aristolochic acid into their tissues, where the poison will persist through metamorphosis and into adulthood.

=== Pupa ===
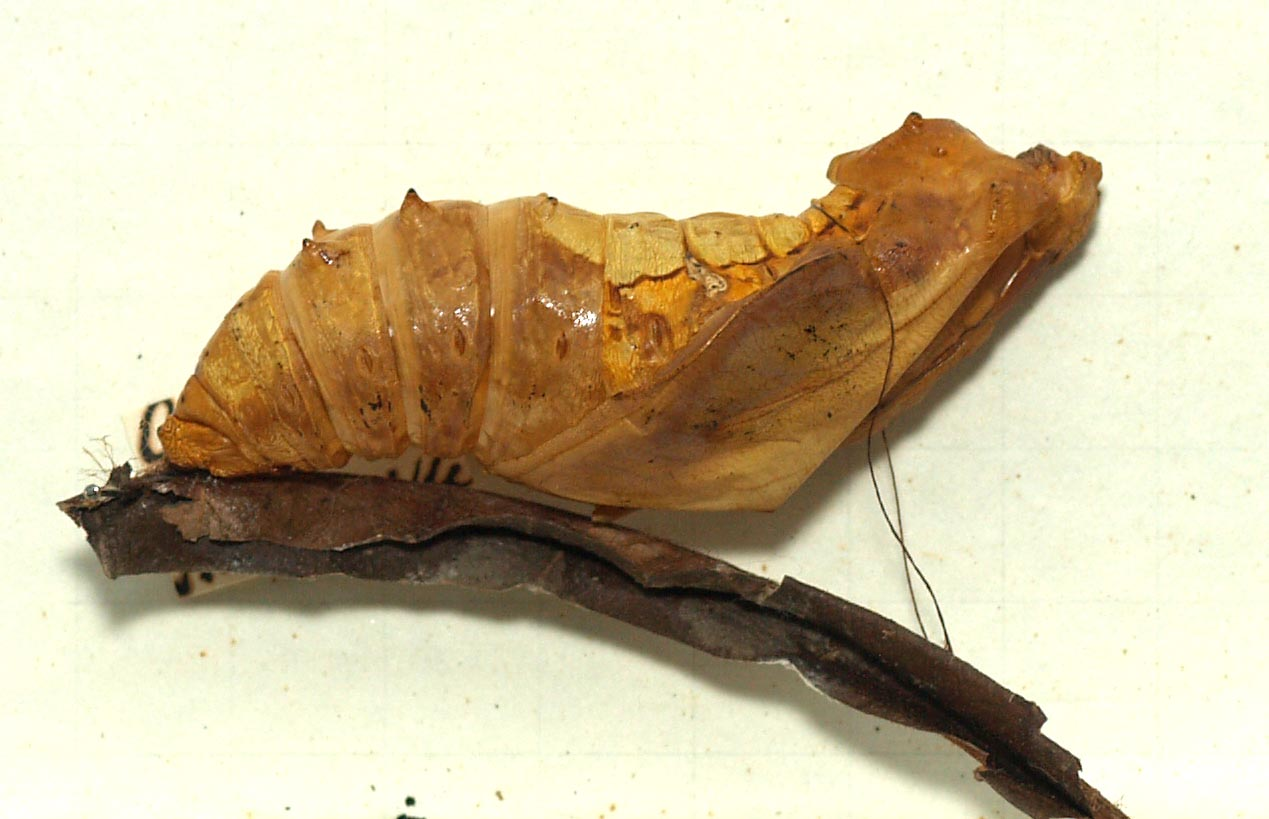
Pupa of Ornithoptera victoriae

Birdwing chrysalids are camouflaged to look like a dead leaf or twig. Before pupating, the caterpillars may wander considerable distances from their host plants. In O. alexandrae, it takes about four months to get from egg to adult. Barring predation, this species can also survive up to three months as an adult.

=== Imago ===
Birdwings inhabit rainforests and adults are usually glimpsed along the forest periphery. They feed upon—and are important long-range pollinators of—nectar-bearing flowers of the forest canopy, as well as terrestrial flowers, such as lantana. They are strong flyers and seek sunlit spots in which to bask.

Breeding behaviour varies little between species; the female's role is relatively passive, slowly fluttering from perch to perch while the male performs an elaborate, quivering yet stationary dance 20–50 cm above her.

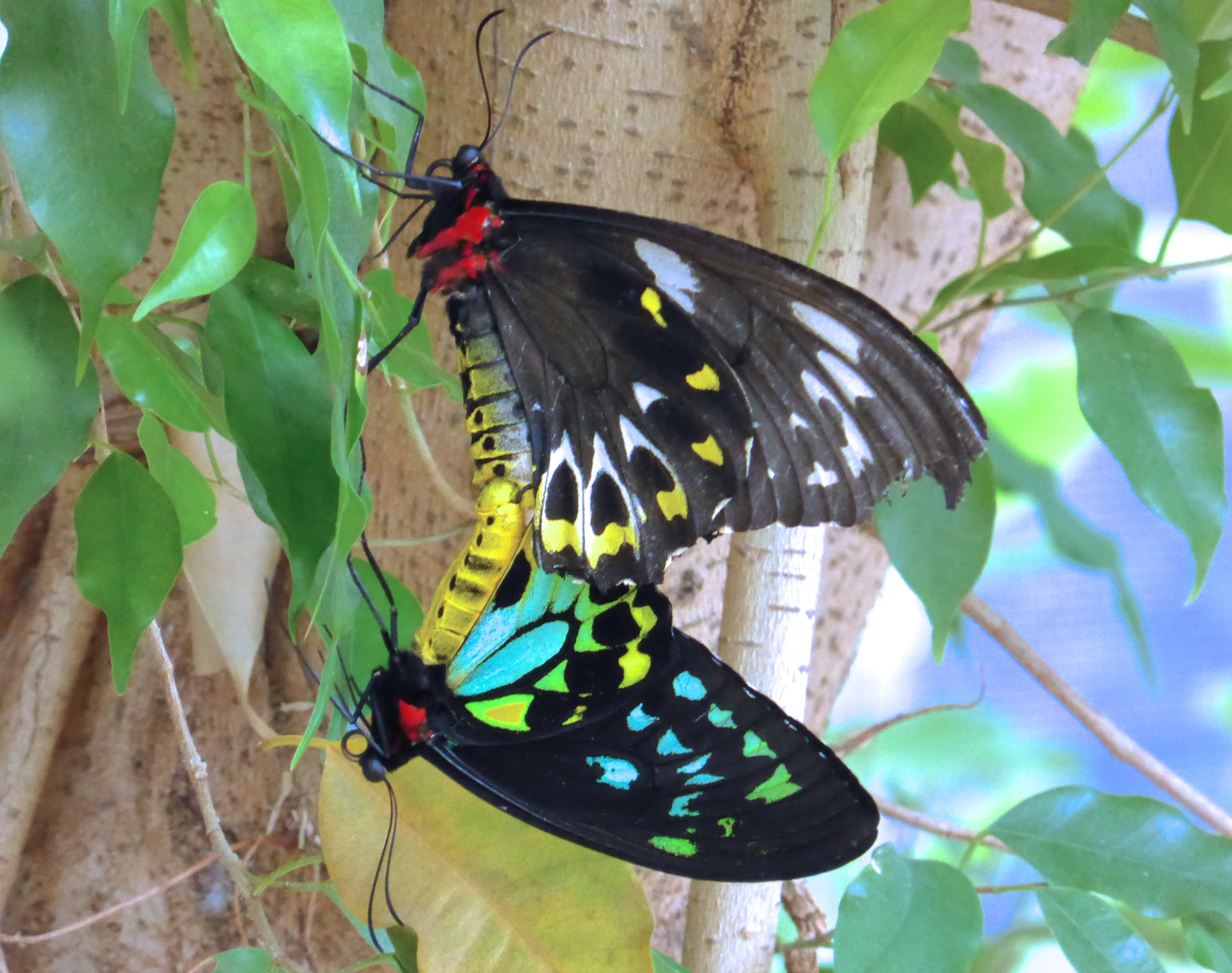
Copulating pair of Ornithoptera euphorion (female above, male below). The sexes are quite dissimilar in appearance, as is typical of species in the genus Ornithoptera.

Birdwings are typified by large size (up to a maximum body length of 7.6 cm or 3 inches and a wingspan of 28 cm or 11 inches in O. alexandrae), showy colouration (in contrasting shades of green, yellow, black, white, and sometimes blue or orange), and slender, lanceolate forewings. With few exceptions (i.e., the New Guinean O. meridionalis and O. paradisea), the hindwings lack tails. Sexual dimorphism is strong in Ornithoptera species only, where males are black combined with bright iridescent green, blue, orange, or yellow while the larger and less colourful females are overall black or dark brownish with white, pale brown, or yellow markings.

Males and females of most Troides birdwings are similar and have jet black to brown dorsal forewings, often with the veins bordered in grey to creamy white. At least one of these darkly-coloured species (T. rhadamantus) possesses thermoreceptors on the anal veins (A2 and A3) of the wings and on the antennal clubs. The antennal receptors of the clubs—which also possess hygroreceptors that measure atmospheric humidity—are known as sensilla basiconica. The thermoreceptors are sensitive to sudden increases in temperature; they are thought to help the butterfly thermoregulate and avoid overheating while basking.

The colours of most species are pigmentary (via papiliochrome); but two species, Troides magellanus and the much rarer T. prattorum, are noted for their use of limited-view iridescence: the yellow of the dorsal hindwings is modified by bright blue-green iridescence which is only seen when the butterfly is viewed at a narrow, oblique angle. This "grazing iridescence" is brought about through diffraction of light (after back-reflection) by the wings' extremely steeply-set, multilayered rib-like scales (rather than the ridge-lamellae of most other iridescent butterflies, such as Morpho species). Such limited-view iridescence was previously only known from one other species, the riodinid Ancyluris meliboeus. In A. meliboeus, however, the iridescence is produced by ridge-lamellar scales and features a wider range of colours.

The close evolutionary relationship between Troides and Ornithoptera butterflies is well demonstrated by the fact that commercial breeders have produced numerous hybrids between the two.

The final and smallest genus is Trogonoptera with just two species. They resemble each other, being overall black with iridescent green markings and a red head. Females are duller than males.

== Distribution ==
Birdwings are generally found from Southeast Asia to northern Australasia. Trogonoptera brookiana inhabits the Thai-Malay Peninsula, Borneo, Natuna, Sumatra, and various surrounding islands. Trogonoptera trojana is endemic to Palawan in the Philippines. Troides species are distributed widely across the Indomalayan realm, but may be found as far east as New Guinea in the case of Troides oblongomaculatus. Some species may be found as far west as India, and are the westernmost distributed of all birdwings. All Ornithoptera species are found in the northern portion of the Australasian realm, east of Weber's line; the Moluccas, New Guinea, the Solomon Islands, and northeastern Australia. An outlier is Ornithoptera richmondia, which may be found in far northeastern New South Wales, Australia in the southernmost area of its range; the southernmost distribution of all birdwings.

== Status and protection ==
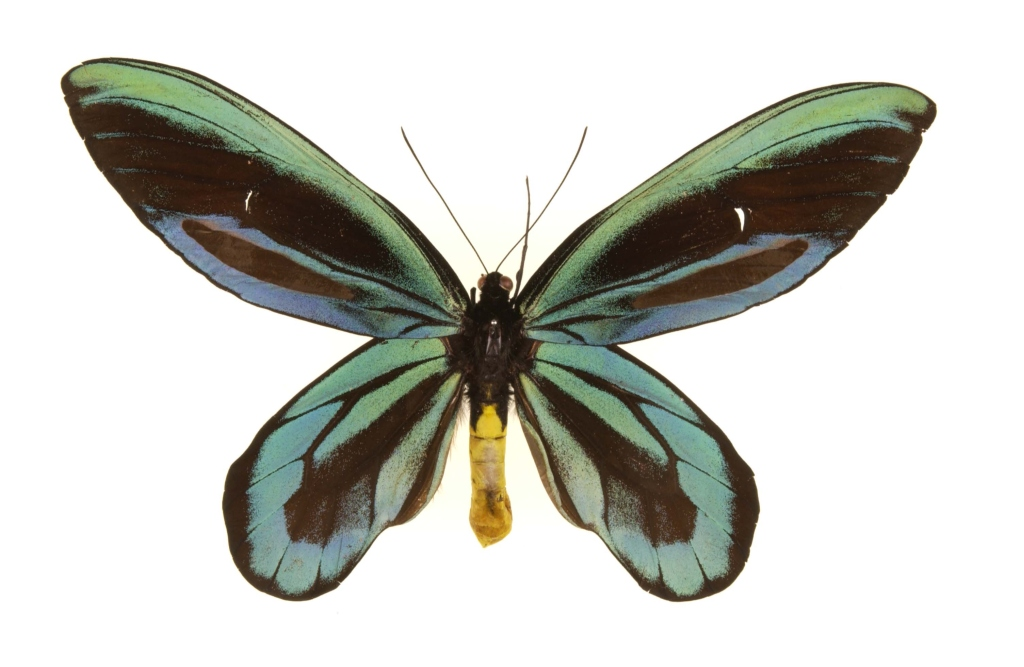
O. alexandrae has a very small distribution and is the only birdwing on Appendix I of CITES

With the exception of Queen Alexandra's birdwing (O. alexandrae), all birdwings are listed in Appendix II of CITES, and accordingly their trade is restricted in countries that have signed the CITES convention. Exceptions are made for captive-reared specimens, which mainly originate from ranches in Papua New Guinea and Indonesia. Most species of all three genera have now been reared in captivity, though with significant differences in the quantities reared of each species. O. alexandrae is listed on Appendix I and therefore cannot legally be traded internationally. At the 2006 meeting of the CITES Animals Committee some suggested O. alexandrae should be moved to Appendix II, as the conservation benefits of sustainable management perhaps are higher than those of the trade ban.

Three Troides and eight Ornithoptera species have been given assessments by the IUCN Red List, with classifications ranging from "least concern" to "endangered".

Richmond birdwings (O. richmondia) depend on the plant Aristolochia praevenosa which they need for their caterpillars. However, the very similar Aristolochia elegans (Dutchman's pipe) which can be found in many Australian backyards, kills the caterpillars.

== Reproduction ==
Ornithoptera, or the genus of birdwing butterflies, usually reproduce sexually and are oviparous. In butterflies sex is determined by a WW/WZ system, with a heterogametic female, reverse of that found in mammals and many other insects, which have a heterogametic male. During copulation males will transfer an ejaculate containing both sperm and accessory substances that can make up to fifteen percent of a males body mass.

== Mating systems ==
Mating systems, first explored in evolutionary terms by Darwin, includes all behaviours associated with sexual reproduction. Mating systems include all costs and benefits, pre- and postcopulatory competitions, displays and mate choice. Butterfly mating systems have great variation, including strict monandry, one male and one female, to polyandry, having many mates of the opposite sex. Typically Ornithoptera tend to be polygamous, mating with more than one individual.

=== Female choice ===
Female choice can have a serious impact on mate selection and successful reproduction. Several species of Ornithoptera have been known to create hybrids if they have no access to their own species. Troides oblongamaculatus females have been known to choose to mate with other species such as Ornithoptera priamus poseidon, which will attempt mating if their own species is not to be found near by. The females will typically resist mating attempts by covering their abdomen with their forewings or dropping to the ground, making mating near impossible. Although the females usually resist these mating attempts, they have been noted to be more susceptible if they have not had previous encounters with males of their own species.

=== Male courtship ===
Some male Ornithoptera species demonstrate courtship behaviour. Ornithoptera priamus posedion males will approach a female carefully, and examine the female for several minutes. After consideration, the male may choose to hover twenty to thirty centimeters above the female, displaying the bright yellow marking on its hindwings. Meanwhile, the forewings will move forward, exposing the abdomen and androconial hair tufts. Mating is only attempted when the female has ceased to flap her wings. After about thirty seconds of the display, the male will attempt copulation.

=== Cryptic choice: sperm competition and postcopulatory guarding ===
In many animals, females often mate with more than one male. Males who are able will adapt strategies such as postcopulatory guarding to ensure the paternity of the offspring. Following insemination, it is common for the male Ornithoptera to produce a mating plug, which will seal the ostium bursae and prevent remating by the female, as new sperm is unable to enter the opening. The plug does not impede oviposition and may stay in place for the duration of the female's life.

=== Sexual dimorphism ===
Sexual dimorphism is very prominent in Ornithoptera species, the males being black with brightly colored markings of blue, green, orange or yellow and the females are overall black or dark brown. The sexual dichromatism functions in mate recognition by the use of photoreceptors. Due to the protected nature of Ornithoptera it has been difficult to study the spectral sensitivities of the sexes although this difference in coloration alludes to the idea of sensory exploitation of the female's photoreceptors. The sensory bias of females to select for males with brighter wings has yet to be studied in Ornithoptera.

Gyanandromorphism is a very rare condition in which an organism simultaneously expresses both male and female phenotypes. It is only observed in species that express strong sexual dimorphism. Gynandromorphs are suspected to be due to genetic errors associated with cell division such as nondisjunction, as well as fertilization of binucleate ova and fertilisation of multiple sperm that may fuse and act as a second nucleus. Ornithoptera is known to commonly exhibit this phenomenon, but little to no research has been successful in determining why. Those who experience this phenomenon, usually females, show male-pigmented tissues on their wings.

== See also ==
- List of largest insects

== Other references ==
- d'Abrera, Bernard. (1975). Birdwing Butterflies of the World Hill House Publishers ISBN 0947352422
- American Museum of Natural History. BioBulletin: Birdwing butterflies Retrieved June 28, 2005
- Campbell, A.L., Naik, R.R., Sowards, L., and Stone, M.O. (2002). Biological infrared imaging and sensing. Micron 33, 211–225.
- Igarashi, S. (1979). Papilionidae and their early stages. Volume I Text (in Japanese), Volume 2 Plates. Kodansha, Tokyo.
- Parsons, M.J. (1996). A phylogenetic reappraisal of the birdwing genus Ornithoptera (Lepidoptera: Papilionidae: Troidini) and a new theory of its evolution in relation to Gondwanan vicariance biogeography Journal of Natural History Volume 30, Issue 11:1707-1736.
- Parsons, M.J. (1996). Gondwanan evolution of the troidine swallowtails (Lepidoptera: Papilionidae): Cladistic reappraisals using mainly immature stage characters, with focus on the birdwings Ornithoptera Boisduval Bulletin of the Kitakyushu Museum of Natural History 15: 43-118, 34 figures, 2 tables pdf
- Parsons, Michael J. (1 June 1992). "The butterfly farming and trading industry in the Indo-Australian region and its role in tropical forest conservation". Tropical Lepidoptera. 3 (Supplement 1): 1–31.
- Reed, R.D., and Sperling, F.A.H. (2001). Tree of Life: Papilionidae Retrieved June 28, 2005
- Savela, Markku (March 20, 2019). "Troides Hübner, [1819]". Lepidoptera and Some Other Life Forms.
- Vukusic, P., Sambles, J. R., and Ghiradella, H. (2000). Optical classification of microstructure in butterfly wing-scales. Photonics Science News, 6, 66–66.
- Nagypal, Tony. The World of Birdwing Butterflies Archived 2009-02-07 at the Wayback Machine.
- Haugum, Jan. (1981). Notes on the Aristolochia of the Papuan Region, with particular reference to the larval foodplants of the Ornithoptera. Lep. Group Newsl. 2(10), pp. 171–178
- Haugum, Jan; & Low, A. M. (1978). A Monograph of the Birdwing Butterflies. Volume 1, Part 1. Introduction, Ornithoptera (Aetheoptera)., Klampenborg, Denmark, Scandinavian Science Press 1(1)
- Haugum, Jan; & Low, A. M. (1979). A Monograph of the Birdwing Butterflies. Volume 1, Part 2. Ornithoptera (Ornithoptera)., Klampenborg, Denmark, Scandinavian Science Press 1(2)
- Haugum, Jan; & Low, A. M. (1980). A Monograph of the Birdwing Butterflies. Volume 1, Part 3. Ornithoptera (Schoenbergia)., Klampenborg, Denmark, Scandinavian Science Press 1(3)
- Haugum, Jan; & Low, A. M. (1981). A Monograph of the Birdwing Butterflies. Volume 2, Part 1. Trogonoptera & Ripponia., Klampenborg, Denmark, Scandinavian Science Press 2(1)
- Haugum, Jan; & Low, A. M. (1982). A Monograph of the Birdwing Butterflies. Volume 2, Part 2. Troides; amphrysus & haliphron groups., Klampenborg, Denmark, Scandinavian Science Press 2(2)
- Haugum, Jan; & Low, A. M. (1983). A Monograph of the Birdwing Butterflies. Volume 2, Part 3. Troides; helena and aeacus groups., Klampenborg, Denmark, Scandinavian Science Press 2(3)
- Kiyotaro Kondo, Tsutomu Shinkawa & Hirotaka Matsuka. (2003). Molecular systematics of birdwing butterflies (Papilionidae) inferred from mitochondrial ND5 gene Journal of the Lepidopterists' Society 57:17-24 pdf
- Robert Henry Fernando Rippon (1898 to 1906) Icones Ornithopterorum [London] Published by the author at Upper Norwood, London, S.E.
- Schäffler, Oliver . (2001). Schmetterlinge der Erde, Butterflies of the World Part XII (12), Papilionidae VI: Ornithoptera Edited by Erich Bauer and Thomas Frankenbach Keltern: Goecke & Evers; Canterbury: Hillside Books. ISBN 9783931374839 Supplement to von Knötgen, 1997
- von Knötgen, Béla. (1997). Ornithoptera: Ornithoptera Schönbergia, Aetheoptera Wangen (Allemagne): MGG Verlag, 1997. Parallel text in German, English and French.
- Darby, A.W. (1982). "The female genitalia of the Birdwing Butterflies, part 1 Lepidoptera Group 68. Vejle. 1982. Showing female genitalia of T. helena cerberus, O. priamus richmondia, O. priamus arruana, T. brookiana albescens.
- Darby, A.W. (1983). "The female genitalia of the Birdwing Butterflies, part 2. Lepidoptera Group 68. Vejle. 1983. Showing female genitalia of O. goliath procus, T. amphrysus ruficollis, T. a. flavicollis, T. miranda miranda, T. m. neomiranda, T. cuneifera paeninsulae, T. helena cerberus, T. h. hephaestus, T. oblongomaculatus oblongomaculatus, T. o. bouruensis, T. o. papuensis, T. aeacus aeacus, T. a. thomsonii, T. aeacus formosanus, T. rhadamantus rhadamantus, T. r. dohertyi, T. r. plateni, T. vandepolli vandepolli, T. v. honrathiana, T. criton, T. darsius, T. haliphron haliphron, T. h. socrates, T. h. iris, T. h. naias, T. h. pallens, T. prattorum, T. magellanus sonani, T. hypolitus hypolitus.
