= Mooloolah River National Park =

National park in Australia

- IUCN category II (national park)
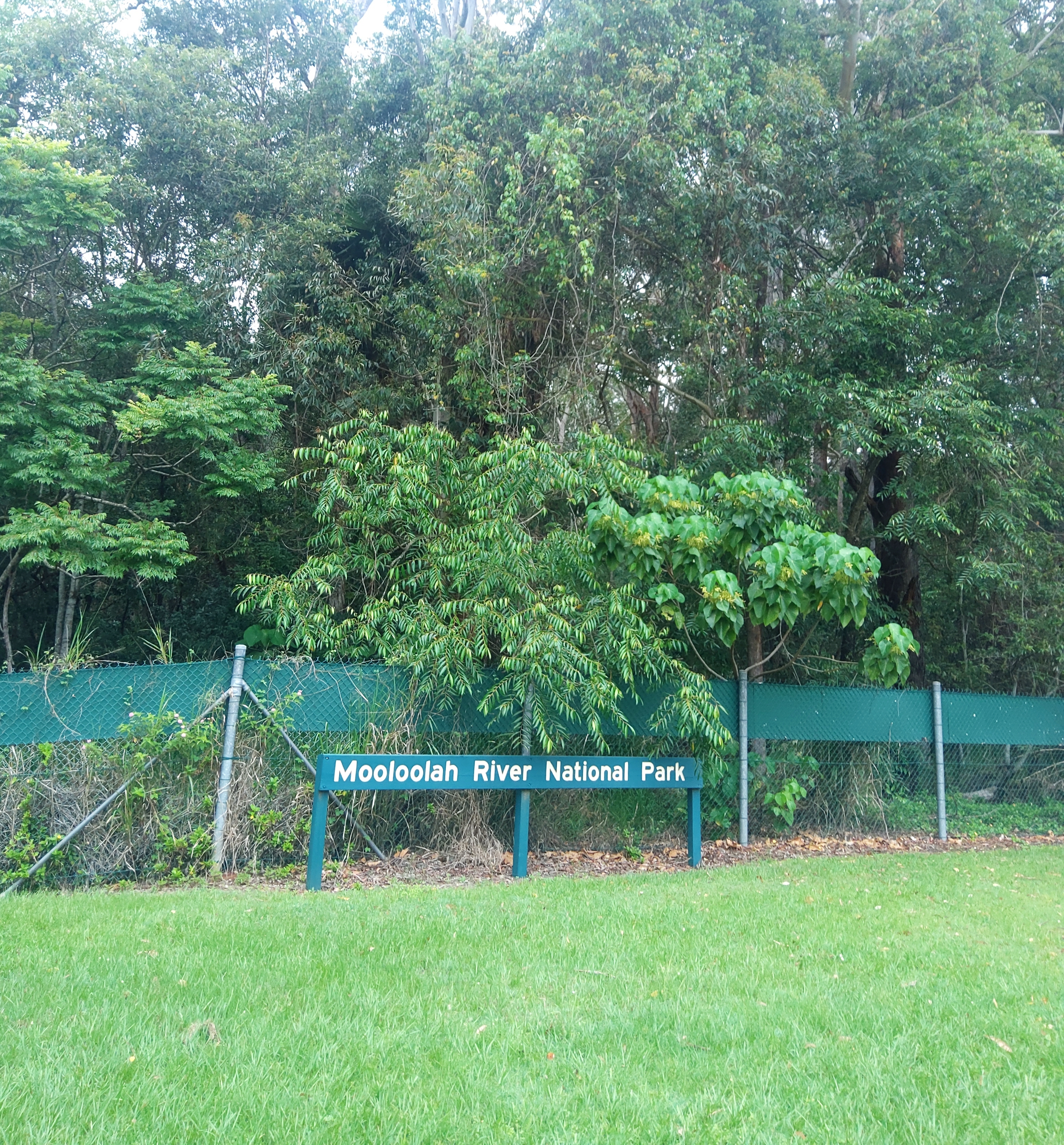
- Park signage, 2021

- Location within Queensland
- Location: Queensland
- Coordinates: 26°43′18″S 153°04′51″E
- Area: 6.69 km^{2} (2.58 sq mi)
- Established: 1960
- Governing body: Queensland Parks and Wildlife Service
- Website: Official website

The Mooloolah River National Park is a nationally protected area located on the Sunshine Coast, Queensland. It covers an area of 830.9 hectares and is bordered by the Mooloolah River to the east, Claymore and Dixon Roads to the west, and the Lower Mooloolah River Environmental Reserve to the south. It is bisected by the Sunshine Motorway with the northern, 161.93 hectare component of the Park being a later addition. The Park was initially vacant crown land prior to national park designation in 1960. Surrounding land uses include livestock grazing, urban development and the campus of the University of the Sunshine Coast. It is the second largest mainland park on the coastal lowlands in South East Queensland after Noosa National Park and represents an example of low-lying coastal floodplain distinctive of the region.

The Jowarra section of the Park is located at the north western corner of the intersection of Steve Irwin Way (formerly Glasshouse Mountains Road) and the Bruce Highway. It is a remnant of coastal rainforest and cut off from the main body of the Park with the only connection via the Mooloolah River itself. The Park is used for conservation and study purposes and recreationally by bushwalkers and bird watchers.

== Ecology ==
The Park provides important habitat for numerous species endemic to eastern Australia and south east Queensland, owing its species diversity to varied ecosystem types and ecotones. It represents an important remnant of coastal heathland once common in the region and a refuge for the associated flora and fauna. Almost half the area of the Park is coastal and sub-coastal floodplain wet heath swamp and approximately one third coastal and sub-coastal floodplain tree swamp containing Melaleuca and Eucalyptus species in the Park's wetland areas.

Seven of the 10 vegetative communities in the Park are regionally significant. The forest red gum (Eucalyptus tereticornis) along with the blackbutt-tallowwood (Eucalyptus pilularis-E. microcorys) are classed as endangered regional ecosystems under Schedule 1 of the Vegetation Management Regulation 2012 (VMR 2012). Five other regional ecosystems present in the Park are listed as of concern in Schedule 2 of the VMR 2012 including the paperbark teatree (Melaleuca quinquenervia) open forest/woodland, wallum banksia (Banksia aemula) woodland, scribbly gum (Eucalyptus racemosa) open forest, sedgelands and closed heath.

== Flora ==
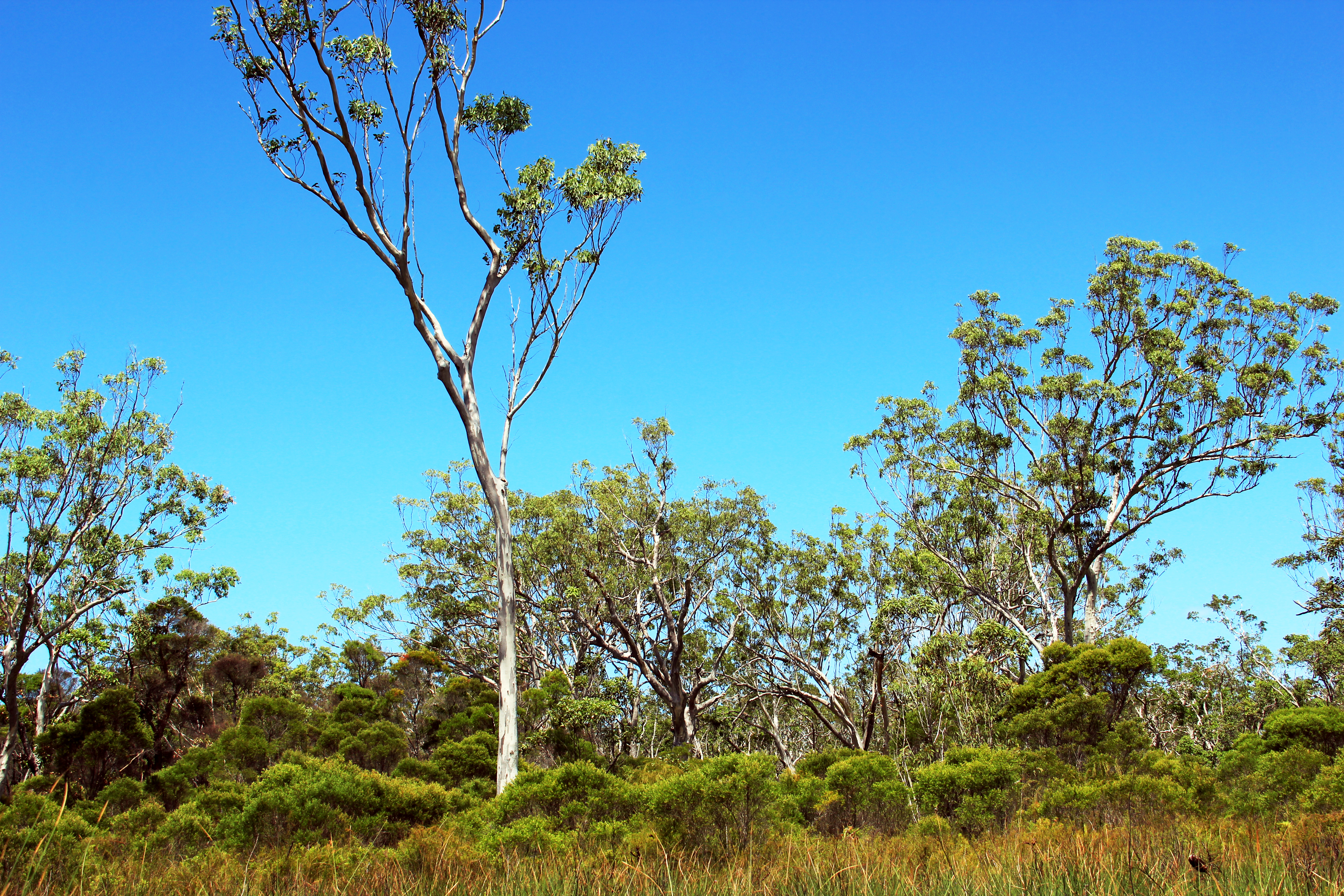
Park vegetation, 2014

With a variety ecosystem types and communities the Park is home to a wide array of endemic flora types, a number of which are threatened regionally. The Park contains three examples of flora listed as endangered under the Nature Conservation Act 1992 (NC Act) and/or the Environmental Protection and Biodiversity Conservation Act 1999 (EPBC Act) and two species listed as vulnerable under both Acts. The Mt Emu Sheoak (Allocasuarina emuina) is listed both under the NC Act and the EPBC Act as endangered. A wind-pollinated shrub it is restricted to the coastal heaths of south east Queensland and was likely more widespread prior to encroaching primary production industries and urbanisation. The species is also highly reliant on fire regimes which have been altered due to urbanisation.

The swamp stringybark (Eucalyptus conglomerata) is endangered under both the NC Act and the EPBC Act. The species grows in the margin between open forest and heathland in sandy acidic soils which are at times waterlogged. The Christmas Bells (Blandfordia grandiflora) plant is listed as endangered under the NC Act and is located in sandy acidic soils of damp heathland and sedgeland.

The Acacia attenuata is listed as vulnerable under both the NC Act and the EPBC Act and is endemic to South East Queensland. Populations persist close to the coast in the ecotone between wet heathland and open eucalypt forests within the Park. It relies on disturbance such as fire events for seed recruitment. The species can tolerate disturbed environments and has been observed in man made disturbed areas, easements and road reserves.^{,} The tiny wattle (Acacia bauera subsp. baueri) can be located in the Park and is listed as vulnerable under the NC Act.

== Fauna ==
=== Mammals ===
There are 19 species of mammals recorded in the Park. Macropod species include the eastern grey kangaroo (Macropus gignateus) and the swamp wallaby (Wallabia bicolor) with both also using the buffer zones around the Park. Other species include the short beaked echidna (Tachyglossus aculeatus), the eastern bent-winged bat (Miniopterus schreibersii oceanensis) the little bent-winged bat (Miniopterus australis), four kinds of native rats, brush and ringtail possums, and flying foxes. Koalas (Phascolarctos cinereus) have been recorded in the area and although listed as occurring within the Park in Queensland Government records, a viable population is not believed to be present in the Park apart from anecdotal records mentioning a population in the section north of the Sunshine Motorway.^{,}

=== Amphibians ===
The Park is home to ten species of frogs including threatened ‘acid frogs’ termed as such by having the ability to inhabit acidic water bodies. Their preferred habitat is wet coastal heathlands with acidic waters (pH less than 5). Significant threats include the destruction of coastal wetlands and changes in water quality and availability. These species include the wallum froglet (Crinnia tinnula) listed as vulnerable in the NC Act, the wallum sedge frog (Litoria olongburensis) listed in the EPBC Act and NC Act as vulnerable, and the wallum rocketfrog (Litoria freycineti) listed as vulnerable in the NC Act. These three frogs are also recorded outside the Park in the Lower Mooloolah River Environmental Reserve which provides a buffer zone and extension of habitat. Acid frogs can tolerate fire events as long as suitable water sources are available. The introduced cane toad (Rhinella marina), prevalent across south east Queensland, is also recorded in the park.

=== Birds ===
The Park contains a wide assortment of bird species and up to 136 different species are listed. Significant species include eastern grass owl, sea eagles, various parrot species, goshawks, kites, the white-throated needle tail, egrets, herons, wedge-tailed eagles and wrens. The nutmeg mannikin, also known as the scaly-breasted munia (Lonchura punctulata), is an introduced finch species native to tropical Asia. It is able to tolerate disturbed environments and may pose a threat to native finches through competition. The Park is recorded habitat for the ground parrot (Pezoporus wallicus wallicus) listed as vulnerable under the NC Act. It is confined to heathlands and sedgelands and has numerous predators including the eastern grass owl, feral cat, brown falcons (Falco berigora) and snakes.

=== Reptiles ===
The Park is home for nine reptile species including the lace monitor (Varanus varius), eastern water dragon (Intellagama lesueurii), freshwater snake (Tropidonophis mairii) and the golden crowned snake (Cacophis squamulosus).

=== Insects ===
The park contains five species of butterfly – the common evening brown (Melanitis leda bankia), the monarch (Danaus plexippus plexippus), the Richmond birdwing (Ornithoptera richmondia), and two types of jezebel (Delias sp.) one being the black jezebel (Delias nigrina).

The vulnerable Richmond birdwing butterfly, occurring only in subtropical northern NSW and South East Queensland, is under threat from the removal of its already fragmented rainforest habitat. Its exclusive host plant, the Richmond birdwing butterfly vine (Aristolochia praevenosa), listed as near threatened itself, is recorded both inside the Park and outside in areas to the south.^{,} The vine is under competition from other invasive weed species and outside the Park is affected by land and road side reserve clearing. The introduced Dutchman's pipe vine is poisonous to the larvae of the Richmond birdwing is a considerable regional threat, though not recorded in the Park as yet.^{,}

== Environmental threats ==
The Sunshine Coast region is experiencing rapid urban expansion adding to environmental pressures on the Park. Urban development is encroaching on native bushland and reducing the effectiveness of the Park's buffer zones making it more isolated from surrounding natural areas. Heathlands once common across south east Queensland are experiencing pressures from urbanisation and fragmentation, and species occupying those habitats are now under threat. Much of the habitat occupied by wallum dependent species such as the wallum rocketfrog, wallum sedgefrog and wallum froglet has been cleared for primary production, sand mining and residential development as these areas were once considered useless lands. The Park's southern bordering areas are used as pastureland and also support a number of introduced weed species.

Multiple threatening processes affecting the Park suggest that management and observation of species numbers within the Park should be undertaken to ensure they do not decline unexpectedly, particularly if they already have certain specialized requirements. Altered burning frequencies resulting from the need to protect property and prevent a reduction in living amenity for nearby residents can have a detrimental effect on fire dependent species. The hydrological balance and water quality in the Park can be potentially altered by changes to surrounding drainage systems and for amphibians present in the Park this could put additional pressures for them in an environment that is already restricted, fragmented and in decline.

The Mt Emu Sheoak faces pressure from loss of suitable habitat, urbanisation and primary production outside the Park, and altered fire regimes and invasive species from within. The Acacia attenuata is also under threat from altered fire regimes, fragmentation and loss of habitat and, given its reliance on seasonally waterlogged areas, modified hydrological processes.^{,} Similarly for the swamp stringybark the main threats are clearing, drainage works, the invasive groundsel bush (Baccharis halimifolia), exotic grasses and too frequent burning.

Over the coming decades it is possible that species in the Park will be susceptible to the effects of climate change. Prolonged periods of drier conditions could mean less available water bodies for acid frogs and other amphibians to find refuge during fire events. Lack of rain also desiccates the Richmond birdwing vine making it unusable for the Richmond birdwing butterfly larvae as a food source. Alternatively, increased flooding events or drier conditions in the Park may affect water quality and favour some plant species over others. This is a distinct scenario for the spread of lantana (Lantana camara) which as a result of climate change may experience conditions more conducive to its spread.

Invasive species

In addition to the cane toad, cats (Felis catus) and red foxes (Vulpes vulpes) are present in the Park. Cattle using grazing areas in the south access the Park's southern borders and effect on native seedlings and trample vegetation.^{,}

Up to 22 invasive plant and weed species are recorded in the Park. These include but are not limited to groundsel bush (Baccharis halimifolia), camphor laurel (Cinnamomum camphora) and lantana (Lantana camara) which is listed as a Weed of National Significance. A variety of exotic grasses are also present.

== Park management ==
Management of parks, reserves and conservation areas in Queensland are guided by the Master Plan for Queensland's Parks and Forests which sets out the vision, values, goals and strategic objectives of protected area management in the State.

The Park itself is managed by the Queensland Parks and Wildlife Service (QPWS) under the Nature Conservation Act 1992. Management of the Park and other parks in Queensland is under the direction of individual Management Plans – in this instance the Mooloolah Park River National Park Management Plan. The Plan provides an overview of the Park in terms of regional context, species composition, values, threatening process and outlines the key strategies to be employed in managing the Park. The broad management practices such as burn scheduling, weed removal and invasive species control are likely to yield positive results for most species suited to the habitats in the Park.

In addition to the Park's Management Plan, many of the threatened species found in the Park also have their own recovery plans.^{,} Management planning for the Mt Emu Sheoak involves protecting and restoring habitat, translocation, managing fire regimes, stormwater runoff and invasive weed control strategies. Ongoing monitoring of populations as well as further study and community awareness play an integral part in the Mt Emu Sheok's management. An understanding of the species’ genetics assists with translocation and determining appropriate fire management strategies. For the swamp stringybark it is much the same: monitor populations, assess genetic diversity, mitigate threats, and adapt management actions as required, including seed collection and storage and managing fire regimes. It is important for plant species with seed banks in the soil to have in place erosion and stormwater runoff controls to prevent their loss from otherwise suitable habitat.

Healthland communities are influenced by and rely on fire events for regeneration. Traditional burn frequencies have been altered due to increased burning to reduce fuel loads and to prevent the risk to property. An understanding of fire management across the Park in terms of the areas to be burnt, timing and its effects on the various ecosystem types is important and can affect species richness and distribution. Fire events that are too rare or too frequent can result in a loss of habitat and food sources for species that proliferate at certain times after fire. The current management strategy for burns is no more than 30% in any one year in an 8–12 year regime.

The Mooloolah National Park Management Plan specifies a number of guidelines for the planning and implementation of these burns. The Park also falls under the guidance of the QPWS Planned Burn Guidelines. The Guideline provides for specific fire management across the various vegetation communities in the region such as heathlands, open forest, woodlands and melaleuca communities as would be found in the Park. This allows for the tailored burning of these areas to provide the most optimal conditions for ecosystem health. The Guidelines also allow for the controlling of noxious weeds such as lantana and advice for the avoidance of peat fires.

The management of the areas surrounding the Park is important as many species located in the park are also located in the Park's vegetated buffer zones. The species in these areas may face considerably more threats and less protection than what the Park affords but these areas provide a valuable buffer for the intra-park species and the benefits associated with a larger overall habitat. Undertaking management options in external areas, such as in the Lower Mooloolah River Environmental Reserve, including weed removal, stock exclusion and controlled burnings will assist in protecting the Park's ecosystems and species.

== See also ==
- Protected areas of Queensland
