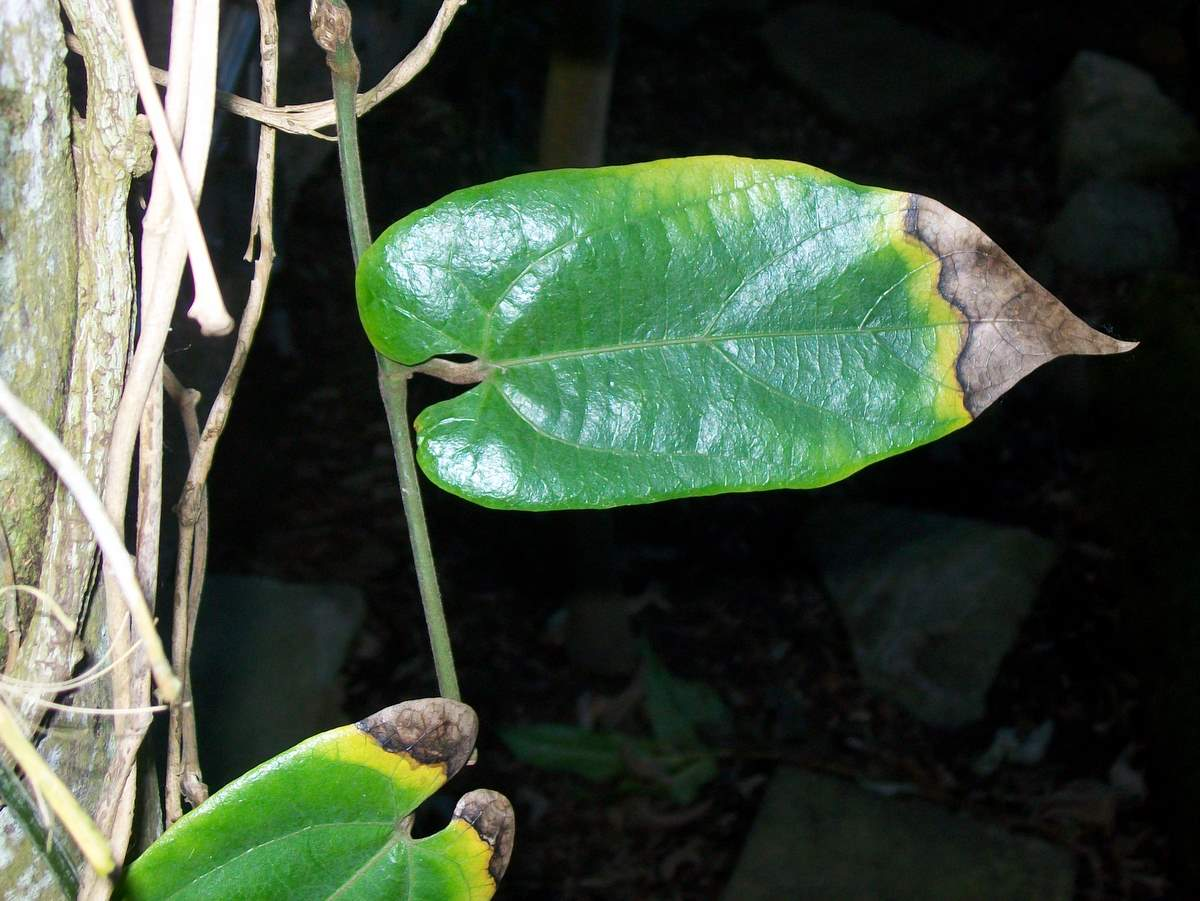

Scientific classification
- Kingdom: Plantae
- Clade: Tracheophytes
- Clade: Angiosperms
- Clade: Magnoliids
- Order: Piperales
- Family: Aristolochiaceae
- Genus: Aristolochia
- Species: A. australopithecurus

Binomial name
- Aristolochia australopithecurus (Mich.J.Parsons) Buchwalder & Wanke

Synonyms
- Pararistolochia australopithecurus Mich.J.Parsons

= Aristolochia australopithecurus =

Cairns birdwing butterfly vine

Species of flowering plant

Pararistolochia australopithecurus, synonym Pararistolochia australopithecurus, is an Australian plant in the Aristolochiaceae or birthwort family, native to Queensland. It is a rainforest vine and the host plant for the Cairns birdwing butterfly and the red-bodied swallowtail. Found in the area around Mount Bellenden Ker of north Queensland. Between the Little Mulgrave River and the South Johnstone River.

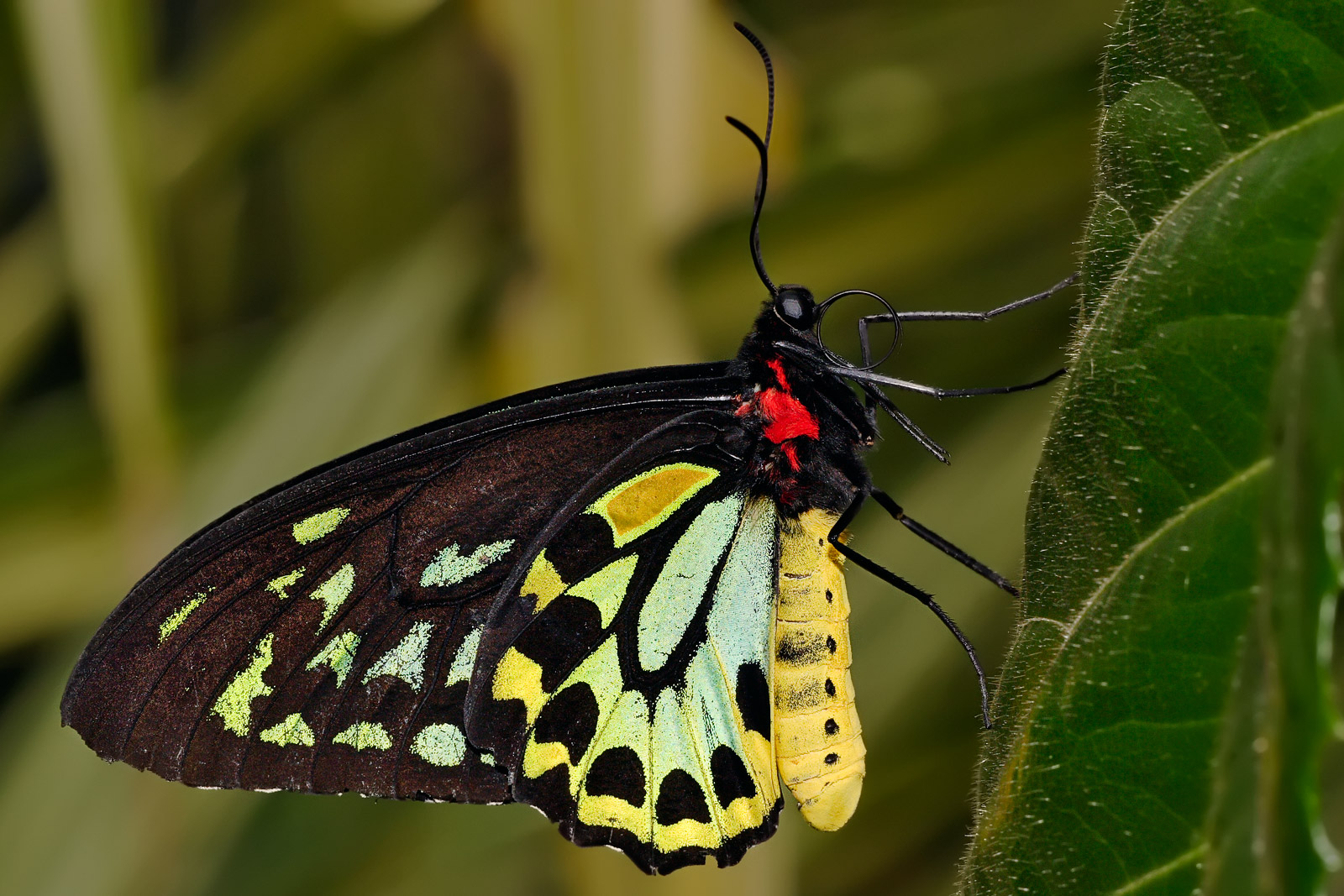
Cairns birdwing butterfly

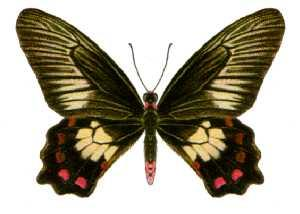
Red-bodied swallowtail
