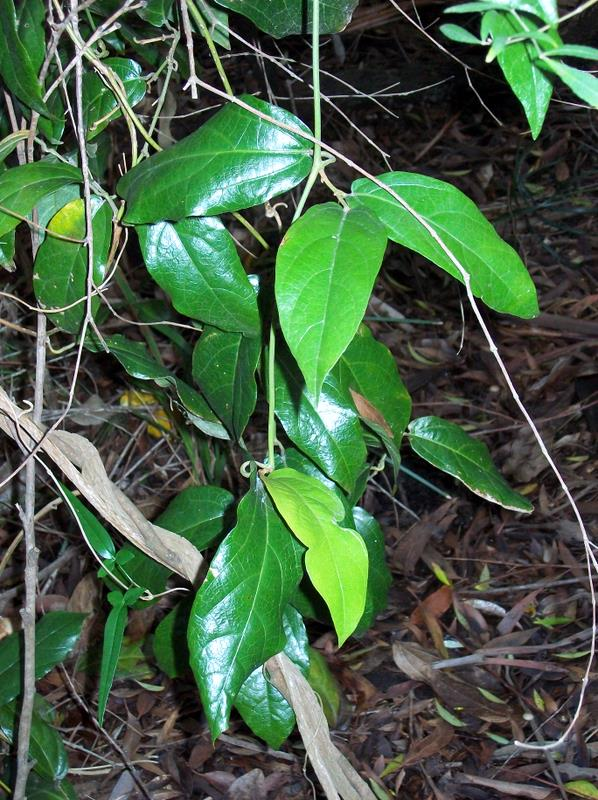

Scientific classification
- Kingdom: Plantae
- Clade: Tracheophytes
- Clade: Angiosperms
- Clade: Magnoliids
- Order: Piperales
- Family: Aristolochiaceae
- Genus: Aristolochia
- Species: A. praevenosa

Binomial name
- Aristolochia praevenosa F.Muell.

Synonyms
- Pararistolochia praevenosa (F.Muell.) Mich.J.Parsons

= Aristolochia praevenosa =

Richmond birdwing butterfly vine

Species of flowering plant

Aristolochia praevenosa, synonym Pararistolochia praevenosa, is an Australian plant in the birthwort family, native to Queensland and New South Wales. The Richmond birdwing butterfly vine grows in subtropical rainforest in coastal areas north from Wollongbar, in far north eastern New South Wales and adjacent areas in south eastern Queensland. It has been recorded as far north as the Mary River. It also grows in tropical north eastern Queensland, where it is a food plant for the Cairns birdwing butterfly.

== Description ==
Aaristolochia praevenosa grows as a large woody vine, characterized by dense brown hairs on leaf stems, shoots and flowering parts.

The ovate to elliptic shaped leaves measure from 7 to 25 cm (3–10 in) long, and 2.5 to 8 cm (1–3.4 in) wide. The base of the leaf is heart shaped or rounded. The leaf surface is a dull dark green above, and hairy below, particularly on the leaf veins. The leaf stems are 1 to 3 cm (0.4–1.2 in) long, thick and twisted.

Two to six tubular shaped flowers form on racemes in summer and autumn. The flowers are 2.5 cm (1 in) long, purple or pinkish with bright yellow inside. Flower stems mostly originate from the leaf axils. The fruit is an orange ribbed capsule, oblong or oval in shape, 2 to 4 cm (0.8–1.6 in) long.

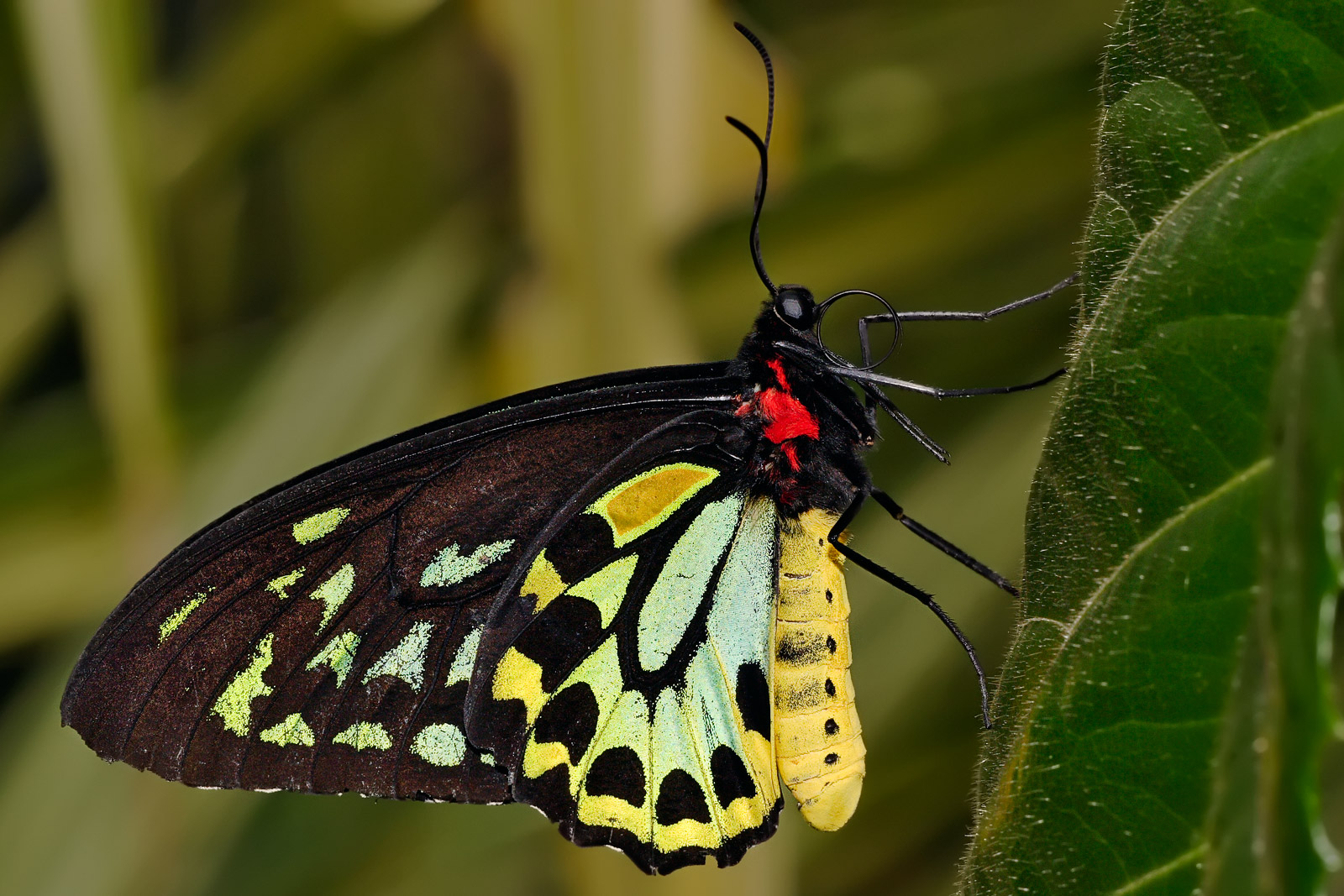
Cairns birdwing butterfly

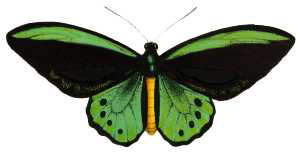
Richmond birdwing butterfly

== Taxonomy ==
First described by Ferdinand von Mueller in 1861 as Aristolochia praevenosa, it was placed in its current genus by Parsons in 1996.

== Germination ==
Flowers are pollinated by the Forcipomyia midge. Cuttings are poor to good in striking, and growth is slow. However, germination from fresh seeds is not difficult. Seeds are viable for germination for around three months. Appropriate watering, weed removal, protection from snails, climbing support and fertilizing are recommended for young plants.

== Conservation ==
In Queensland, it is categorised as Near Threatened.

== Ecology ==
=== Richmond birdwing butterfly host plant ===
This vine is the main food species for the Richmond birdwing butterfly. This plant has suffered from habitat loss since the appearance of European settlers. Former areas of its habitat have been almost completely destroyed, such as at the Big Scrub. In recent times there have been programs by schools and government authorities, attempting to encourage new plantings of this vine. This is mostly for the benefit of the Richmond birdwing butterfly. It is considered that the caterpillars of this butterfly do not kill the vines, as the caterpillars only eat new fresh leaves, and ignore the older mature leaves.

=== Pollination ===
Flowers of Aristolochia praevenosa are pollinated by small flies, which may be in the family Phoridae.
