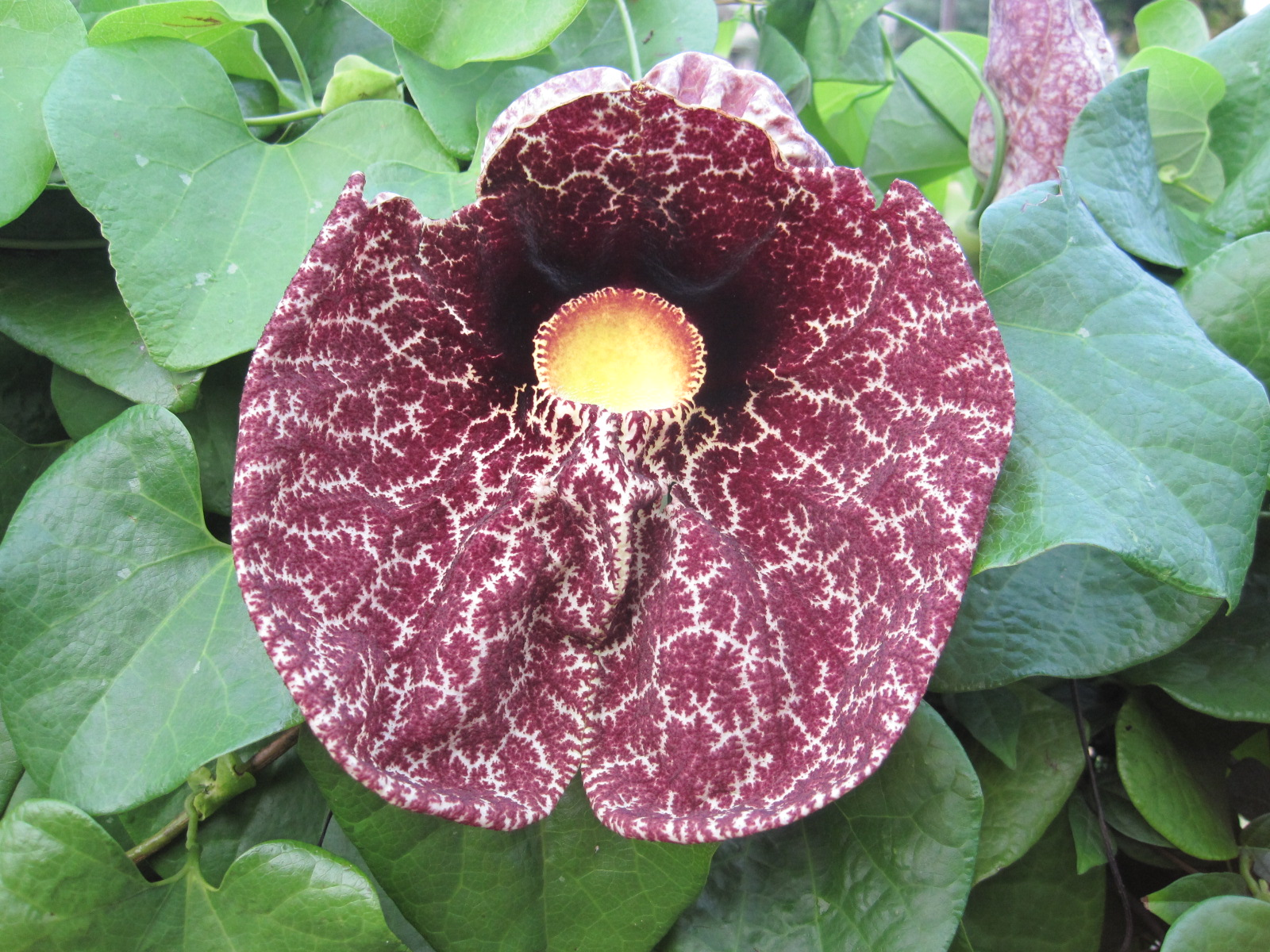

Scientific classification
- Kingdom: Plantae
- Clade: Tracheophytes
- Clade: Angiosperms
- Clade: Magnoliids
- Order: Piperales
- Family: Aristolochiaceae
- Genus: Aristolochia
- Species: A. littoralis

Binomial name
- Aristolochia littoralis D.Parodi

Synonyms
- Aristolochia elegans Mast; Aristolochia elegans var. grandiflora Hassl. ex F. González, 1990; Aristolochia elegans var. hassleriana (Chodat) Hassl., 1912

= Aristolochia littoralis =

Species of vine

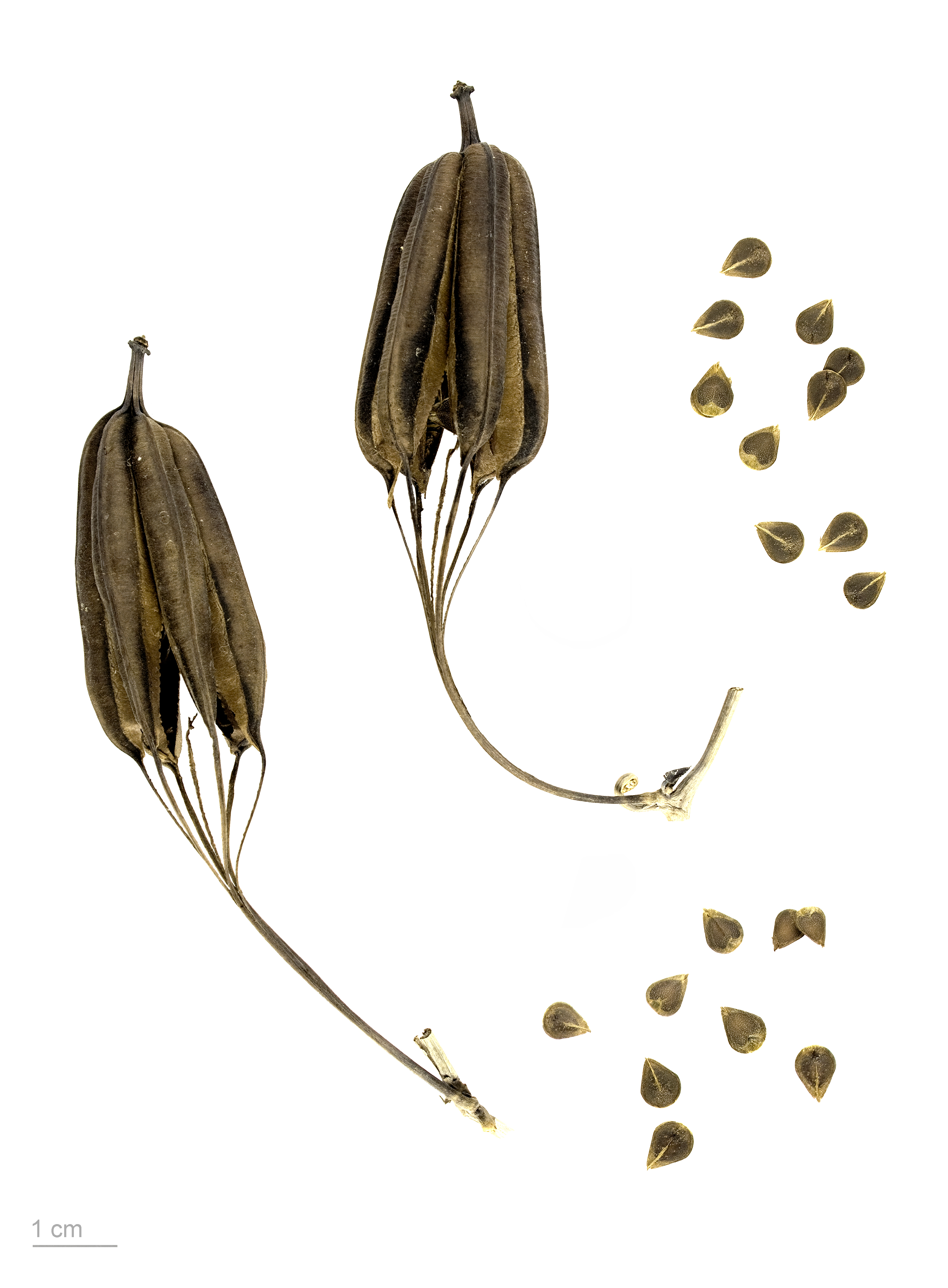
Aristolochia littoralis - MHNT

Aristolochia littoralis, the calico flower or elegant Dutchman's pipe, is a species of evergreen vine belonging to the family Aristolochiaceae.

== Etymology ==
The scientific name Aristolochia was developed from Ancient Greek aristos άριστος 'best' + locheia λοχεία 'childbirth, childbed', as in ancient times the plant was thought to be effective against infections caused by childbirth. The species Latin name littoralis means 'coastal'.

== Description ==
Aristolochia littoralis is a climbing vine that can reach about 3–4.5 metres (9.8–14.8 ft) in length. The slender stems are woody and the leaves are bright green, cordate, amplexicaul, 7–9 centimetres (2.8–3.5 in) long and 5–10 centimetres (2.0–3.9 in) wide, forming a dense attractive foliage. Flowers are heart-shaped, greenish yellow with intricate purplish-brown markings. These unusual flowers are about 7–8 centimetres (2.8–3.1 in) long, grow solitary in the leaf axils and resemble Sherlock Holmes's pipe (hence the common name of "Dutchman's pipe"). The inner surface of the flared mouth is completely purplish-brown. The flowering period extends through all summer. These plants are pollinated by flies which are attracted by the unpleasant carrion-like odor produced by the flowers. The numerous winged seeds are borne in dry dehiscent capsules that split like small parachutes. As the seeds are winged they are easily dispersed by wind. Plants in the related genus Pararistolochia differ by having fleshy moist fruit that do not split. This plant contains aristolochic acid, a toxic alkaloid.

== Distribution ==
The vining plant is native to southern and western South America. It is found in:

- Brazil in Ceara, Mato Grosso, Mato Grosso do Sul, Minas Gerais, Parana, Rio de Janeiro, Rondonia, Santa Catarina, and São Paulo states.
- Argentina in Corrientes, Entre Rios, Jujuy, Misiones, and Santa Fe Provinces.
- Paraguay in Amambay, Central, Concepcion, Cordillera, Paraguari, and San Pedro Departments.
- Bolivia, Colombia, Ecuador, and Peru.

It is an invasive species in Australia and in the southern United States. In Australia it is fatal to the caterpillars of two butterflies, the Cairns birdwing (Ornithoptera euphorion) and of the threatened Richmond birdwing (O. richmondia), and threatens to displace their proper host plant, A. tagala.

== Habitat ==
Aristolochia littoralis prefers acid-neutral soils (pH 5.5 – 7.0) and average moisture, in part sun to shade, at an elevation of about 0–1,150 metres (0–3,773 ft).

== Cultivation ==
This subtropical plant requires a minimum temperature of 7°C (45°F), and in temperate regions is grown under glass. It has gained the Royal Horticultural Society's Award of Garden Merit.

== Gallery ==
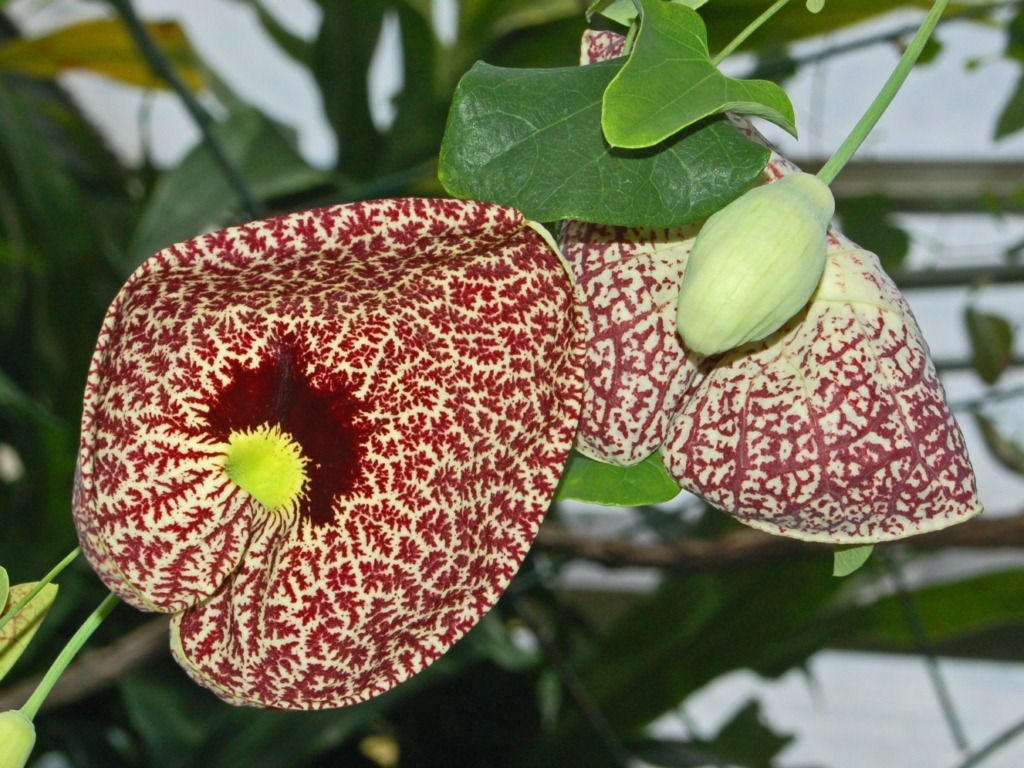
Flower and immature fruit of Aristolochia littoralis

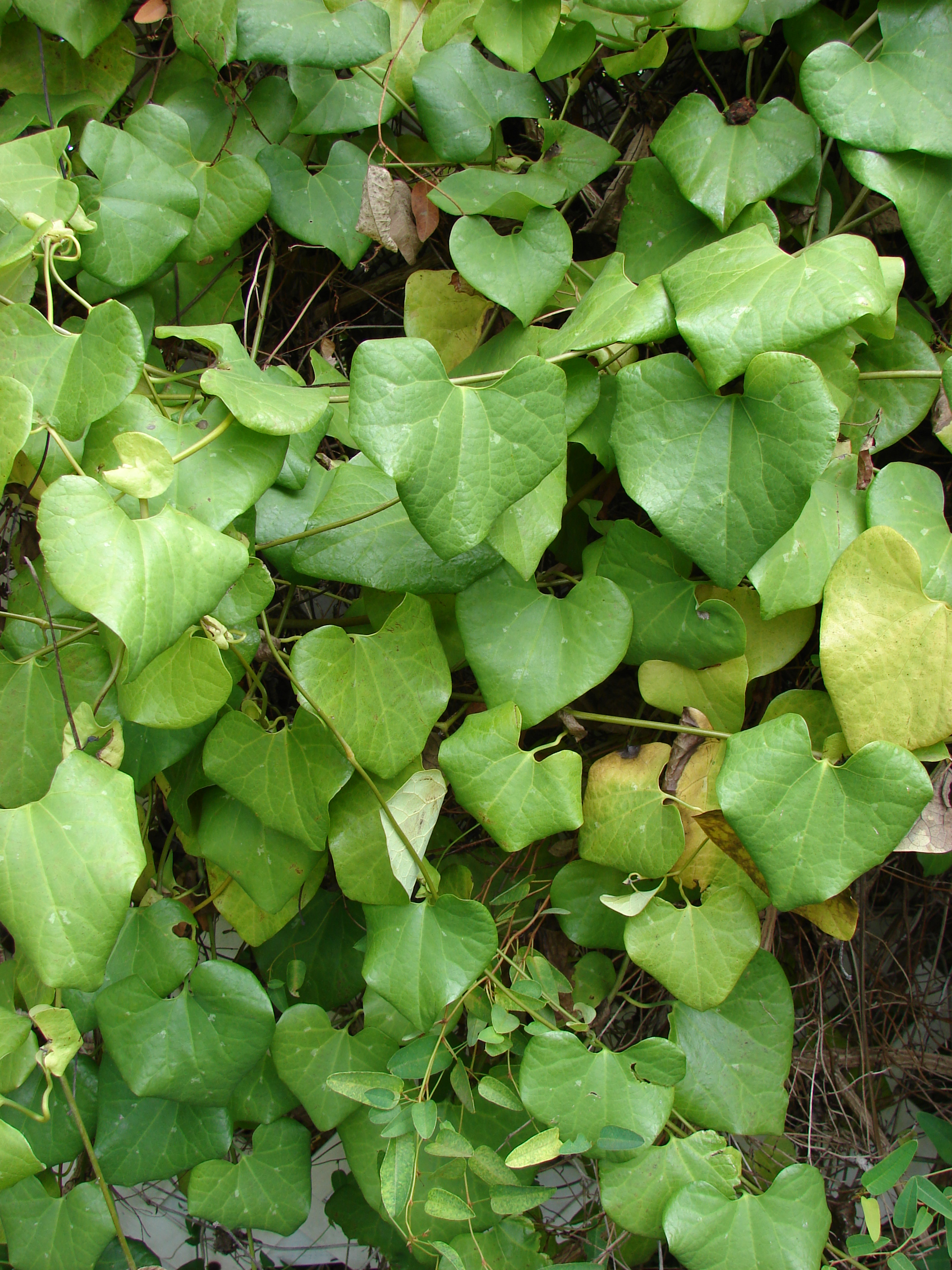
The dense foliage

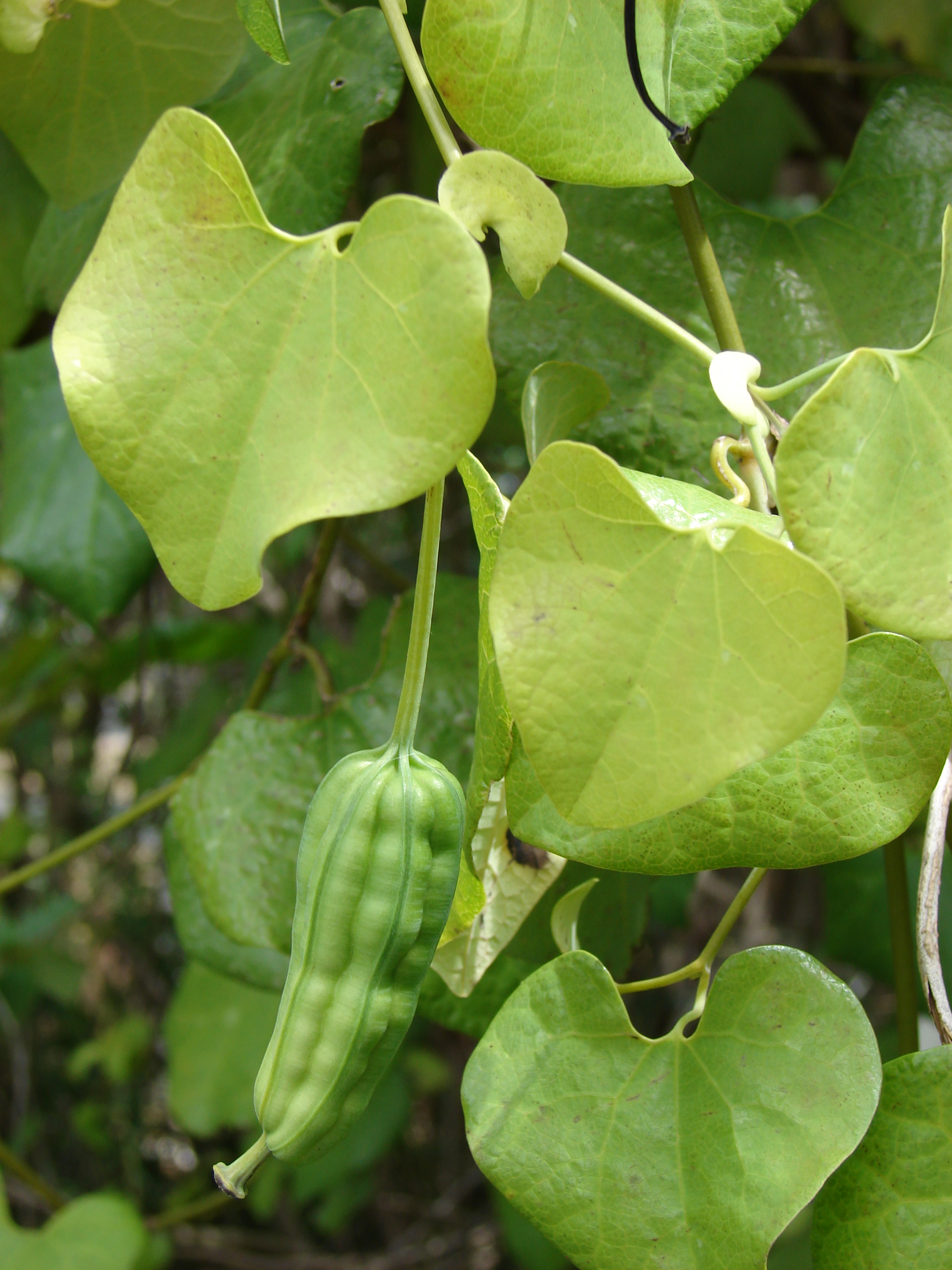
Leaves and immature fruit

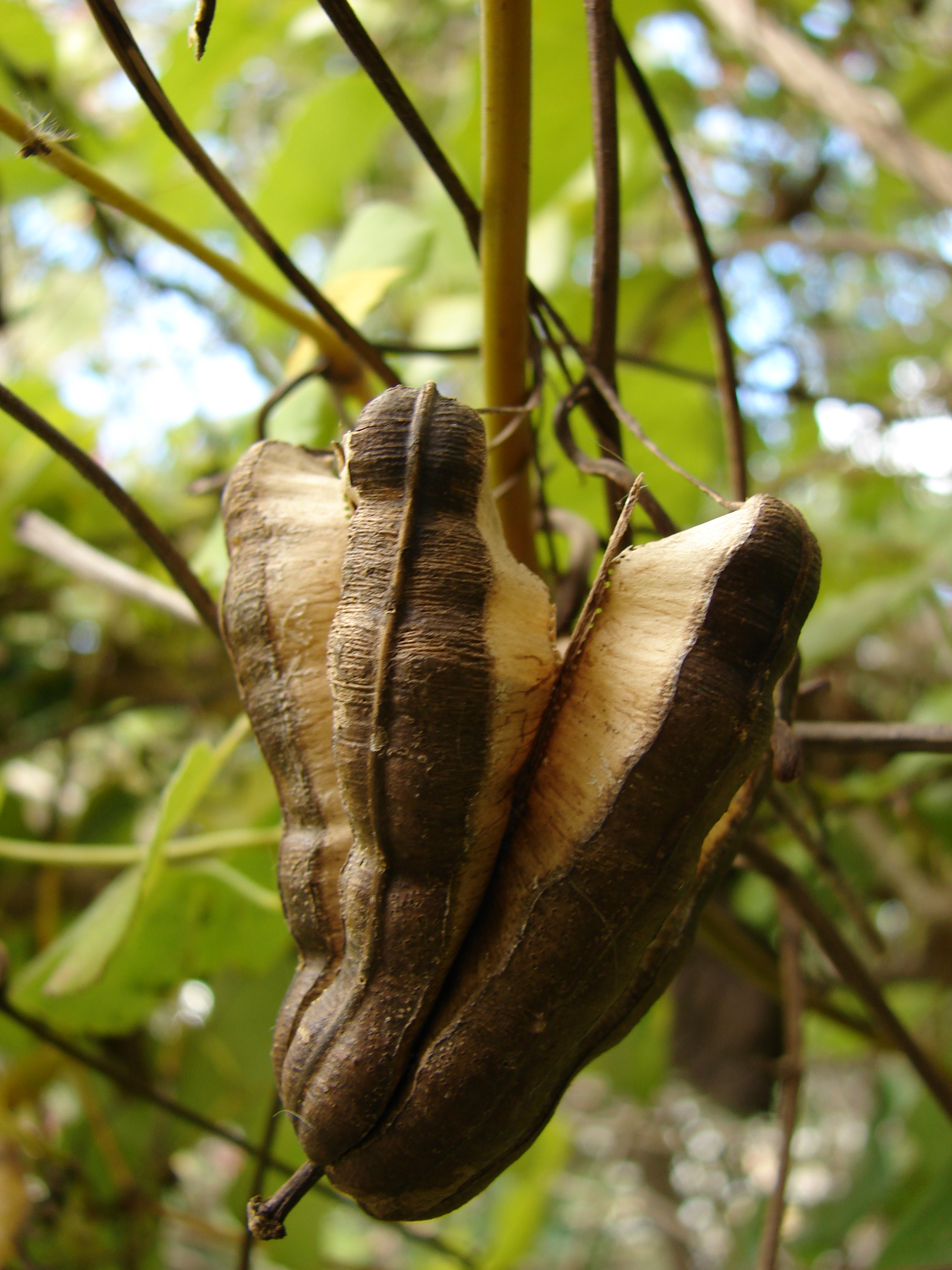
The dehiscent capsules

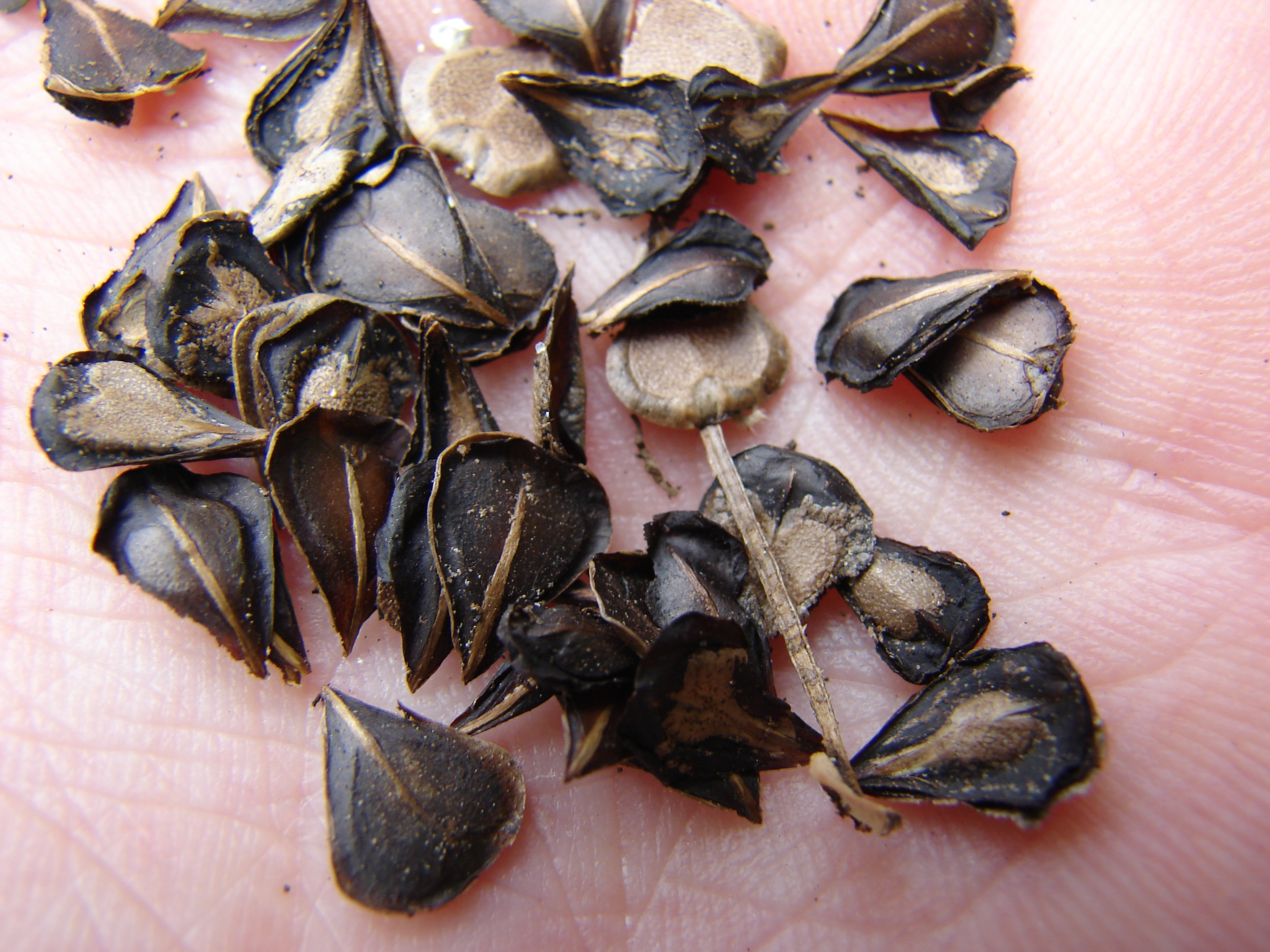
The winged seeds
