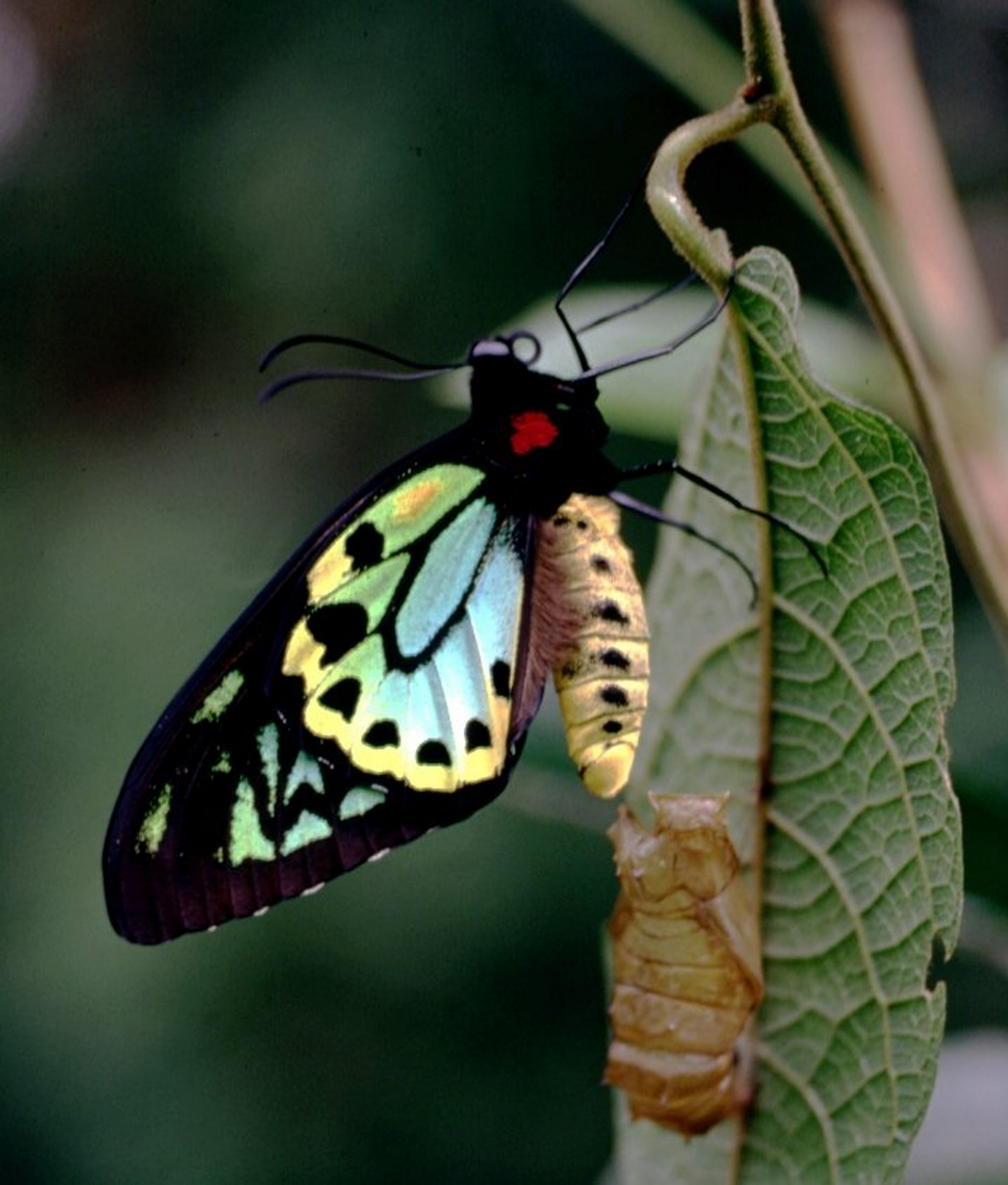
- Live male specimen

Conservation status
- Near Threatened (IUCN 3.1)
- CITES Appendix II

Scientific classification
- Kingdom: Animalia
- Phylum: Arthropoda
- Clade: Pancrustacea
- Class: Insecta
- Order: Lepidoptera
- Family: Papilionidae
- Genus: Ornithoptera
- Species: O. richmondia

Binomial name
- Ornithoptera richmondia (Gray, 1853)
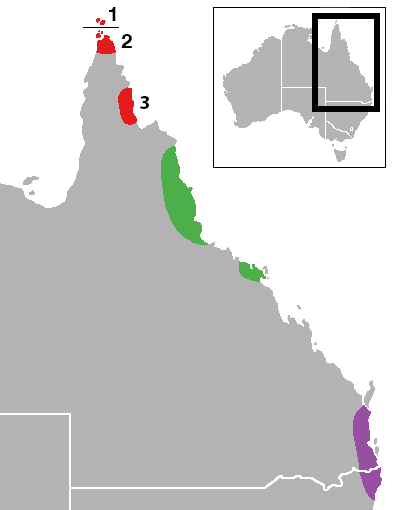
- Distribution of Ornithoptera richmondia (in purple) and other species of Ornithoptera in Australia

Synonyms
- Papilio richmondia; Troides priamus richmondia

= Ornithoptera richmondia =

Richmond birdwing

Species of birdwing butterfly

Ornithoptera richmondia, the Richmond birdwing, is a species of birdwing butterfly that is endemic to Australia. It is the second smallest of the birdwing species, the smallest being Ornithoptera meridionalis.

== Distribution ==
Historically, O. richmondia is recorded from rainforests southwards from Maryborough to the Clarence River in New South Wales. Due to widespread habitat loss throughout its range, its distribution is much more restricted, especially in Queensland. Its present-day range is from Kin Kin and Pomona, North Arm, Yandina, Coolum (although this population is now extinct due to drought), Parklands and Nambour, Diddillibah, Buderim, Eudlo, Palmwoods, the Mooloolah and Diamond Valleys, the entire Blackall Range southeast from Kenilworth to the state forest near the Caloundra Turnoff and west to Peachester and the Stanley River, and the Conondale Range southwards to Mount Mee.

South of Brisbane, the species is recorded along the Nerang River and the Tallebudgera valleys and has an important stronghold in the national parks adjacent to the Queensland-New South Wales border. In New South Wales, the species is widespread in rainforest southwards to the Blackwall Range near Wardell and the Cherry Tree State Forest near Mallangangee (Braby 2000, Sands & New 2002, Sands & Scott 1997). Note that although the species may be abundant at altitude (e.g. the Queensland-New South Wales border ranges national parks), these populations typically die out due to cold winter temperatures and require migration of adults from the lowlands for persistence. Population sizes in these habitats therefore vary from year to year.

A recommended viewing locality for this species is the car park at the base of the summit trail to Mount Warning in Mount Warning National Park, New South Wales. Given good weather during their flight period, sighting this butterfly is almost a certainty.

== Abundance and conservation status ==
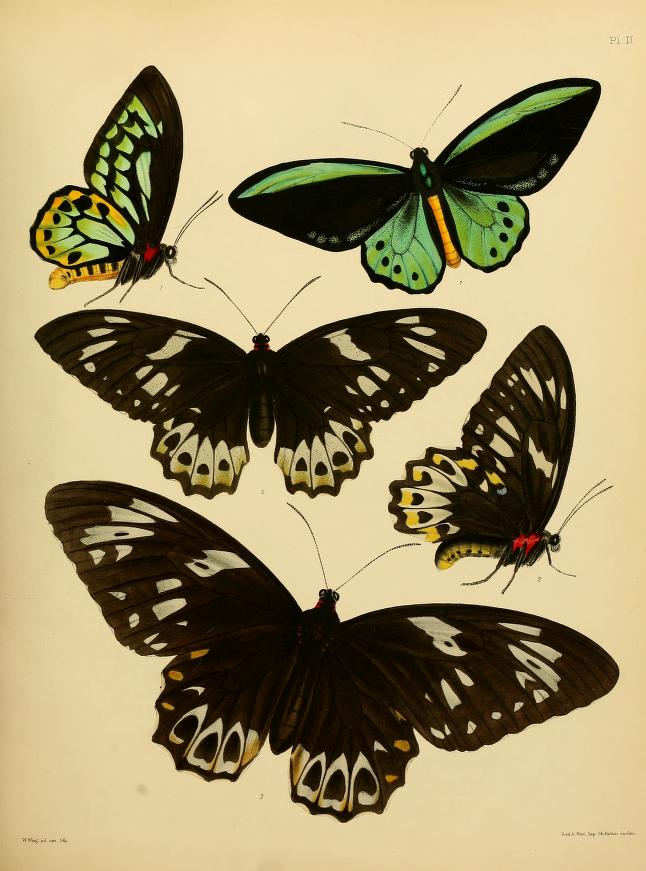
Ornithoptera richmondia figs. 1 and 2 The plate accompanied Gray's original description. The female Ornithoptera euphorion below (fig. 3) is much larger.

O. richmondia has never received an official IUCN classification (Collins & Morris, 1985), however Sands & Scott (1997) regarded it to satisfy the "vulnerable" category because of habitat loss across its former range. Currently, it is considered not of concern in New South Wales and low risk (least concern) in Queensland (Sands & New, 2002). This species was previously more abundant than it is now, especially in Queensland, with Illidge (1927) noting the species to be common in Brisbane in the early 1900s.

North of Brisbane, the species is now restricted to small patches of remnant rainforest with relatively few populations secure in national parks or forest reserves; strongholds include the Connondale and Blackall ranges. Ornithoptera richmondia is more abundant south of the Nerang River, especially in Lamington National Park and the associated border ranges. Threatening processes for this species are habitat loss and several previously robust populations near Buderim now locally extinct due to habitat destruction for housing and commercial development, other habitat clearing activities and edge effects, which alter the climatic conditions required for the immature stages of this species to successfully develop. Another threatening process is the non-native environmental weed Aristolochia littoralis, or Dutchman's pipevine (see below).

In recent years, retired CSIRO entomologist D.P.A. Sands has led a series of recovery projects for O. richmondia. The first was largely run in association with the CSIRO's Double Helix school program (Sands and Scott 1997) and focused on planting Aristolochia praevenosa, in schools and conservation reserves. The current recovery programme is run through the Richmond Birdwing Butterfly Recovery Network, which aims to establish corridors between existing populations and assist existing populations by planting host plants, maintain previous plantings of host plants, propagate further vines for future planting and continue education and public awareness through seminars and newsletters. Both campaigns have been extremely successful in establishing the Richmond birdwing as a flagship species for rainforest conservation in southeastern Queensland (Sands & Scott, 1997).

== Biology ==
=== Host plants and larval biology ===
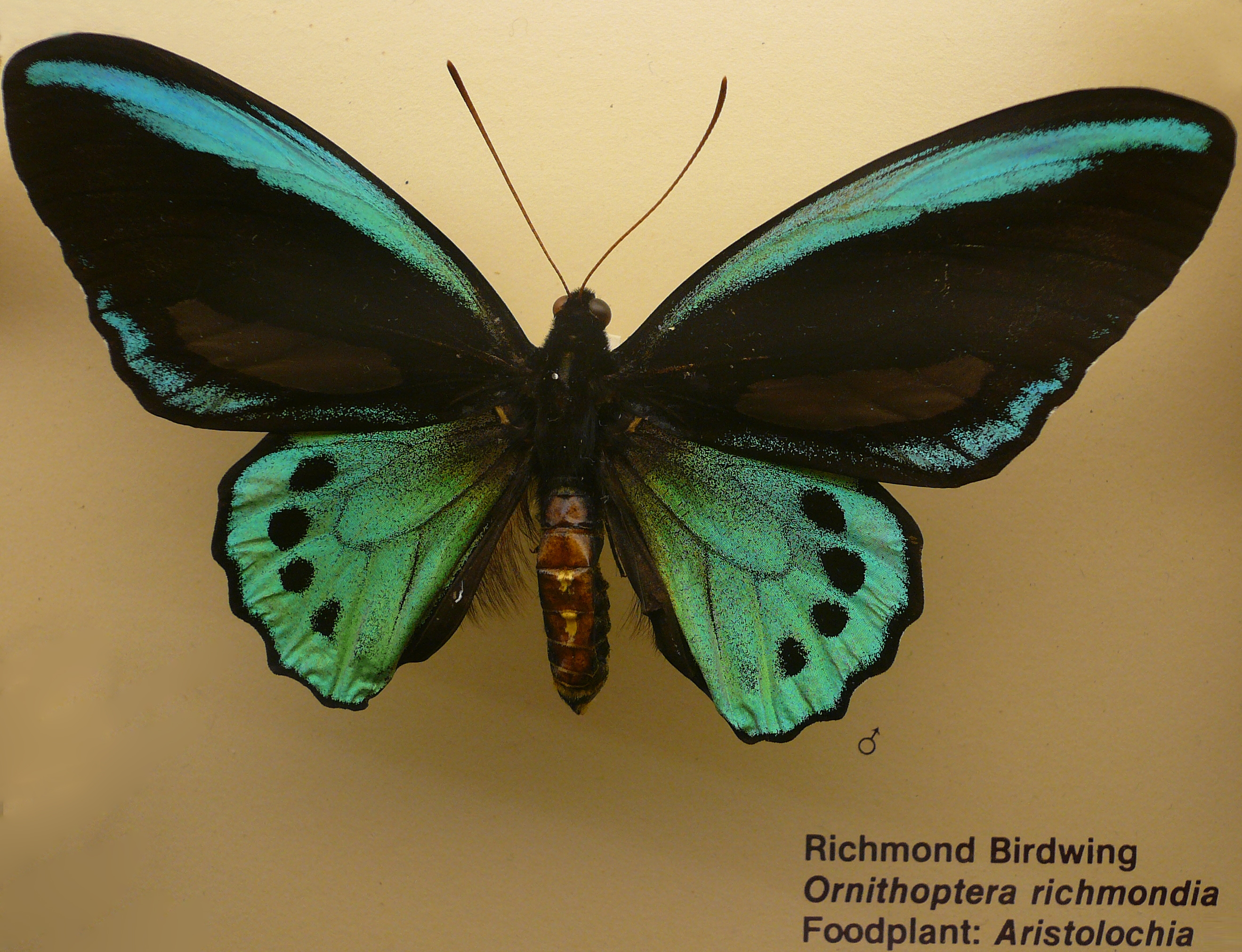
Richmond birdwing, male - Australian Museum, Sydney

O. richmondia normally feeds only on two endemic species of the family Aristolochiaceae, Richmond birdwing butterfly vine (Aristolochia praevenosa) in lowland habitats and Aristolochia laheyana in highland habitats (e.g. the QLD-NSW border range national parks above 800 m) (Braby 2000, Sands and Scott 1997). Its sole non-native host plant is Aristolochia tagala, although larvae do not transfer well to this species if already established on their usual host plants. Eggs are also laid on the introduced calico flower (Aristolochia littoralis), however larvae are killed by feeding on this plant. Cultivation and sale of A. littoralis is strongly discouraged throughout the range of the Richmond birdwing and should not be grown in Queensland at any rate, as it is also toxic to the larvae of the clearwing swallowtail (Cressida cressida), the red-bodied swallowtail (Pachliopta polydorus queenslandicus) and all other Australian birdwings (O. euphorion, O. priamus subspecies). The two native species of Aristolochia utilised by O. richmondia are believed to contain aristolic acids toxic to vertebrate predators.

The larvae of O. richmondia require relatively specialist environmental conditions for their survival and this is one reason why the species does not establish permanently in home gardens. Eggs are usually laid on the soft foliage of leaders extending into the canopy and emerge within about one week. The newly emerged larvae devour their eggshell and then require very soft foliage, as they are incapable of feeding on older, tough foliage. The larvae are extremely ravenous and require large plants; a 10-year-old vine may be needed to sustain a single larva (Sands and Scott, 1997). The fifth (final) instar larva may ringbark the stem of its host as in other Ornithoptera, however there are no records in literature to sustain this. Pre-pupal larvae usually move away from their host plants to pupate, as larvae can be cannibalistic. The pupae are suspended in typical Papilionid fashion by crotchets at the end of their abdomen and a girdle extending around the thorax and require a protected site to survive winter. Ornithoptera richmondia is also the only birdwing known to enter a true diapause; artificial introduction of other Ornithoptera species to within the range of O. richmondia could interfere with this mechanism.

Predators of the immature stages of O. richmondia include parasitic wasps, predatory mites (Erythraeidae) and some rainforest birds.

=== Adult biology ===
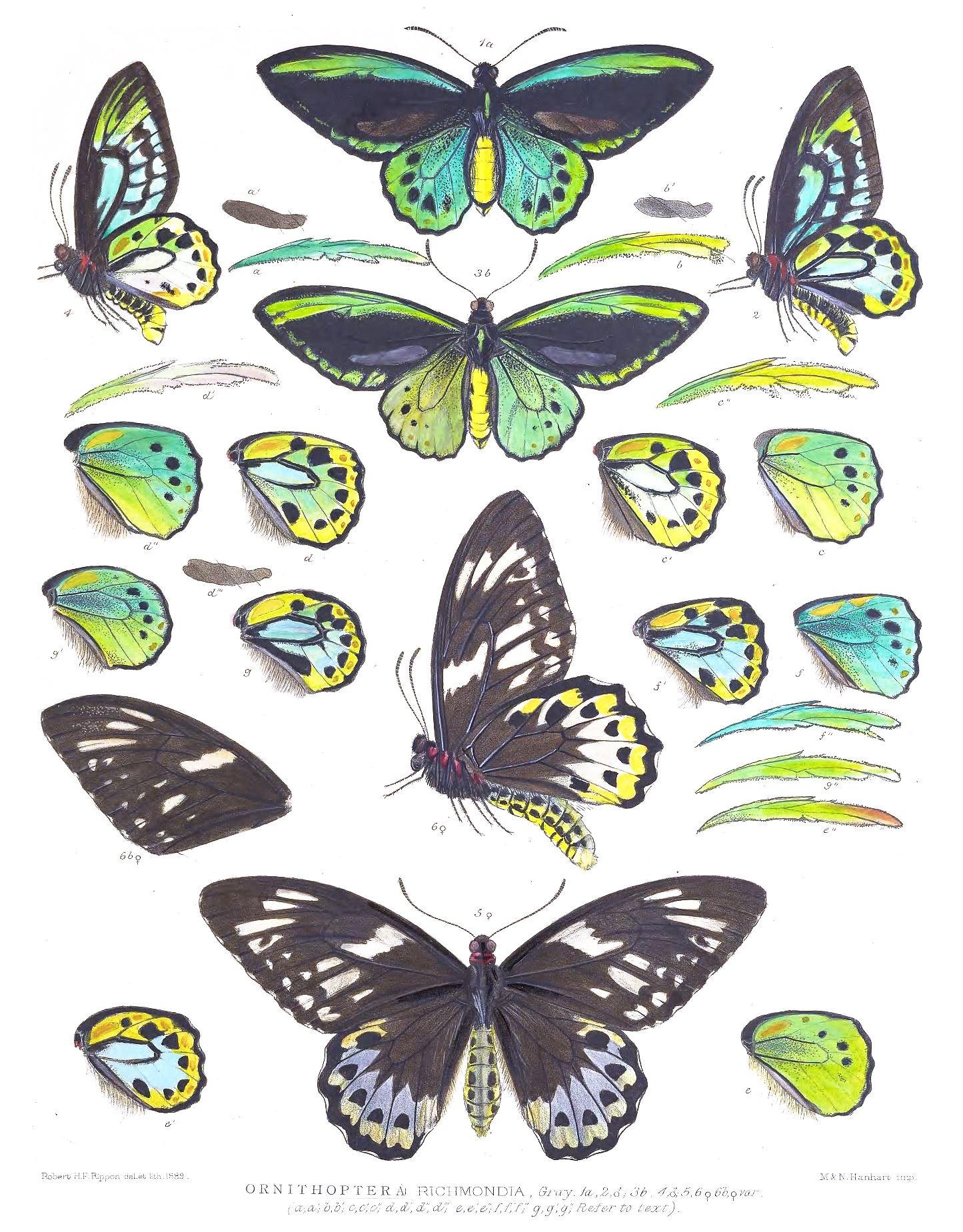

Adult Richmond birdwings are very strong fliers usually active in the early morning and near dusk, when they can be easily observed feeding on flowers such as Lantana (Lantana camara), although eucalypt and Melaleuca flowers are also utilised. Observations of O. richmondia at other times of the day can lead to false impressions of their rarity, as the species can be locally abundant, albeit in small areas. Females are often observed some distance from their habitats and a migration of sorts has been noted in the QLD-NSW border ranges following years of exceptional rainfall. Such migrations allow populations of this species to establish in highland habitats over summer, although they die out over winter due to cold. Birdwing butterflies are extremely elegant fliers, using their forewings to generate most of the power for flight. These are moved in almost a circular arc, while the hindwings act almost as a tailplane. Birdwings of the genus Troides fly in a similar manner. If disturbed, their flight becomes very erratic, essentially a series of skips and hops weaving in and out of foliage. They typically fly high in the rainforest canopy, descending only to feed or oviposit on host plants. Males routinely establish territories along creeks and in rainforest clearings and periodically patrol them during the day, again being most active at dawn and dusk. Courtship is elaborate, with the male initially chasing after the female before hovering above to douse her in pheromones from his androconial brush, a large row of hairs along the anal fold of the hindwing. Females not receptive to such overtures will avoid mating by remaining immobile and preventing the male from settling and pairing with her.

== Taxonomic status ==
The taxonomic status of O. richmondia is still contested and molecular studies are required to establish its relationship with O. euphorion and O. priamus. Ornithoptera richmondia was initially described as Amphrisius australis by Swainson in 1851, and described a second time as Papilio richmondia by Gray in 1853. An application needs to be made to the ICZN to suppress A. australis, as richmondia has been the most commonly used epithet since either publication. Since its initial descriptions, O. richmondia has commonly been treated as a subspecies of the widespread Priam's birdwing (O. priamus). Although Zeuner suggested that O. richmondia may represent a distinct species from examination of the male genitalia, he continued to regard it as a subspecies of O. priamus. Based on Zeuner's argument, D'Abrera (1975) treated O. richmondia as a full species, although this arrangement was not accepted by Haugum & Low (1971). Nonetheless, D'Abrera's treatment of O. richmondia as a distinct species has been followed by most Australian authors since (e.g. Common & Waterhouse 1981, Hancock 1983, 1991; Parsons 1996a, 1996b and Hancock & Orr 1997, Braby 2000). Many non-Australian authors (e.g. Otani & Kimura 1998, von Knotgen 1997, Schaffler 2001, Deslisle 2004) continue to treat O. richmondia as a subspecies of O. priamus, although none cite any of the above Australian studies in their works. The most recent and robust taxonomic assessment of O. richmondia is by Edwards, Newland and Regan (2001) who afford this taxon full specific status, albeit as a species of Troides Hübner.
