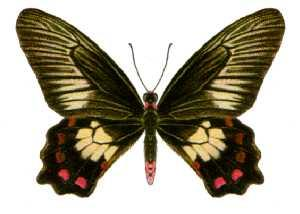

Scientific classification
- Kingdom: Animalia
- Phylum: Arthropoda
- Clade: Pancrustacea
- Class: Insecta
- Order: Lepidoptera
- Family: Papilionidae
- Genus: Pachliopta
- Species: P. polydorus

Binomial name
- Pachliopta polydorus (Linnaeus, 1763)

Subspecies
- See text

= Pachliopta polydorus =

Red-bodied swallowtail

Species of butterfly

Pachliopta polydorus, the red-bodied swallowtail, is a butterfly from the family Papilionidae found in north-eastern Queensland, Australia and Papua New Guinea.

== Description ==
The forewings are black, with white internervular shading. The hindwings have scalloped edges, are black and have no tails. The hindwing has a line of dark-red postdiscal spots. In the middle of wing there is a big white discal patch. The underside of both wings are the same as the above side, but the underside has brighter red spots. The body is black with a red abdomen. The sexes are alike. Average wingspan size is 72 mm for males and 76 mm for females.

== Life history ==
The larva is mottled brown with the rows of red and yellow fleshy tubercles typical of Troidini. The larval food plants are in the genus Aristolochia - Aristolochia chalmersii, Aristolochia indica, Aristolochia tagala, Aristolochia thozetii, Aristolochia australopithecurus, Aristolochia deltantha, Aristolochia linearifolia, Aristolochia peninsulensis. The pupa is white with brown marks. The dorsum is concave, and there is a row of flanges along each side. The pupal length is 3 cm.

== Distribution ==
Indonesia (Moluccas (not Morotai, but including Seram and Ambon), Tanimbar, Irian Jaya, Kai, Aru, Waigeu and Skouten Islands), Papua New Guinea, Bismarck Archipelago (including New Britain), Bougainville, Solomons (including San Cristobal and Ulawa Island), Trobriand Islands, D'Entrecasteaux Islands, Louisiade Archipelago and Australia (northern Queensland).

== Status ==
It is generally common and not threatened as a species, though some subspecies may be threatened.

== Subspecies ==
The following subspecies are recognised: (up to thirty-one subspecies are described)

- P. p. aignanus [Rothschild]
- P. p. asinius [Fruhstorfer]
- P. p. dampierensis [Hagen]
- P. p. godartianus [Lucas]
- P. p. humboldti [Rothschild]
- P. p. kajelanus [Fruhstorfer]
- P. p. lascarus [Fruhstorfer]
- P. p. leodamas [Wallace]
- P. p. manus [Talbot]
- P. p. meforanus [Rothschild]
- P. p. naissus [Fruhstorfer]
- P. p. novobritannicus [Rothschild]
- P. p. orinomus [Rothschild]
- P. p. polydaemon [Mathew]
- P. p. queenslandicus [Rothschild, 1895]
- P. p. septentrionalis [Rothschild]
- P. p. tenimberensis [Rothschild]
- P. p. thessalia [Swinhoe]
- P. p. utuanensis [Ribbe]
- P. p. varus [Fruhstorfer]

== Gallery ==
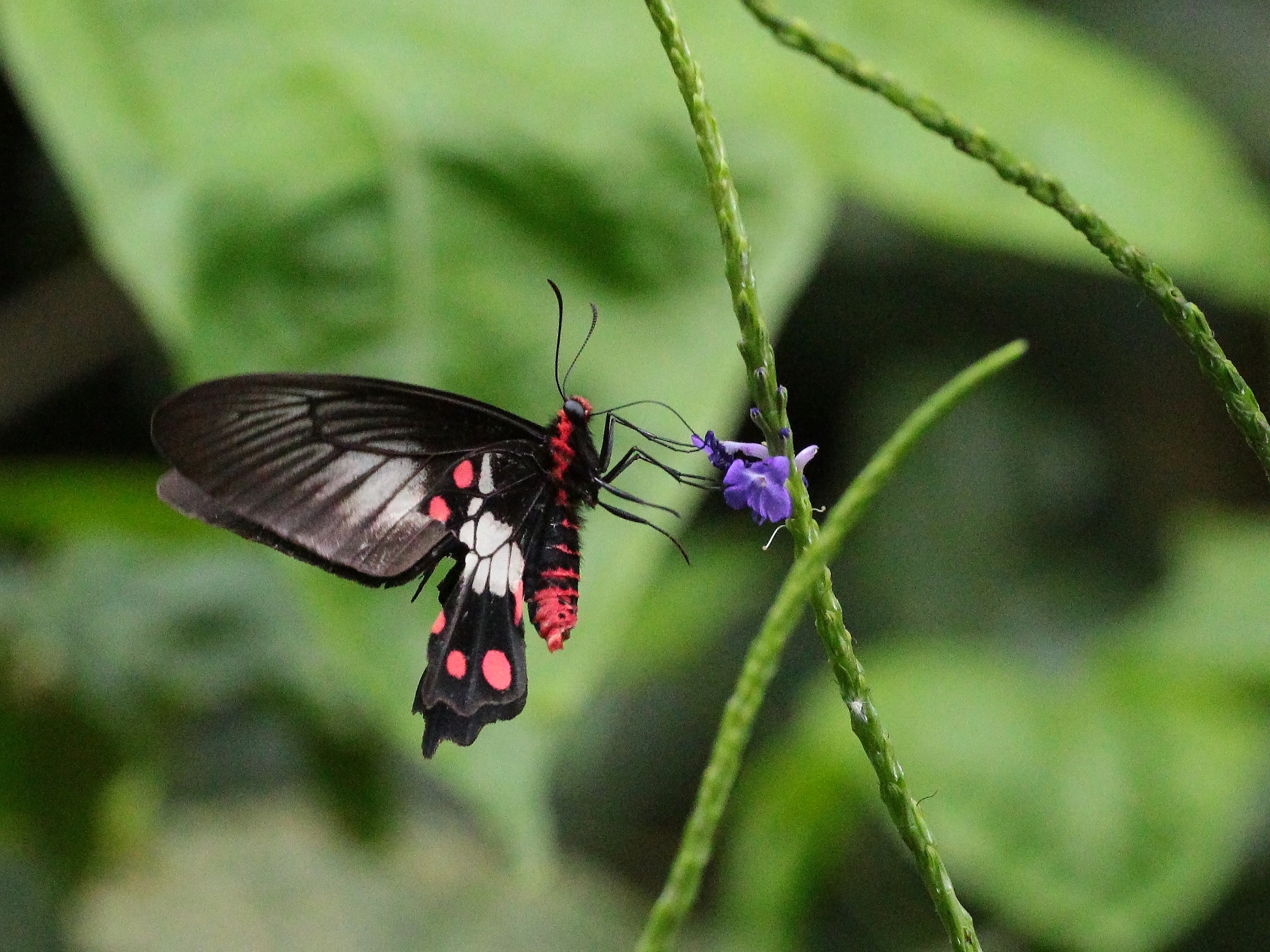
Red-bodied swallowtail, Cairns, Australia.
