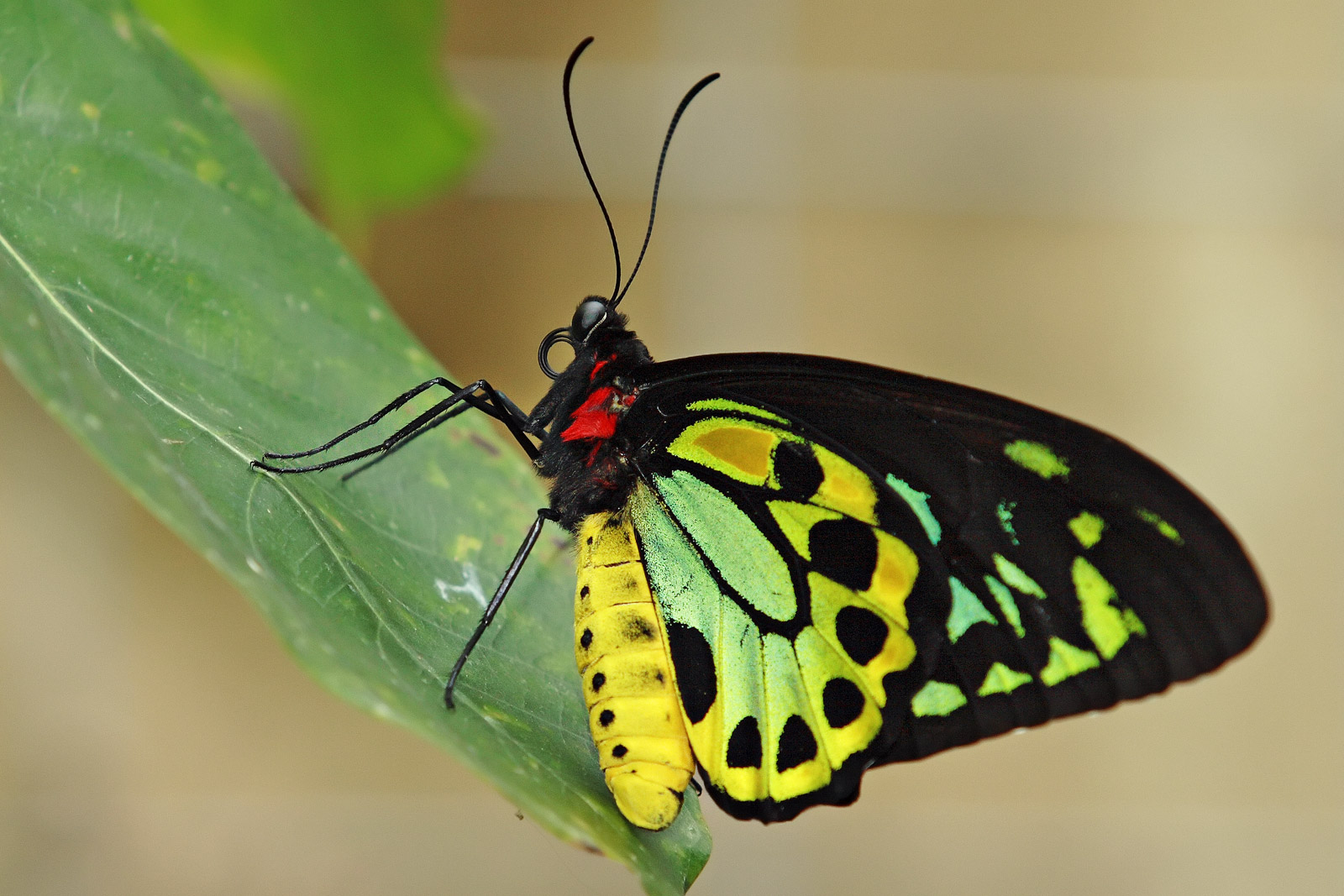
- Male at Melbourne Zoo
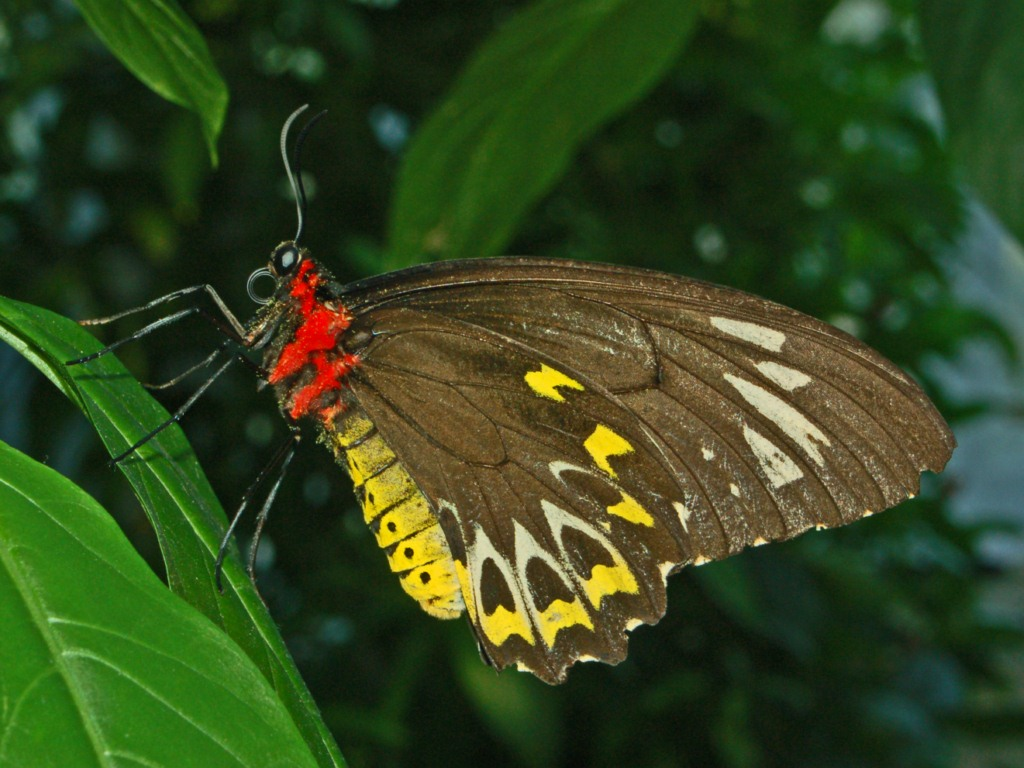
- Female, ventral view

Conservation status
- Least Concern (IUCN 3.1)
- CITES Appendix II

Scientific classification
- Kingdom: Animalia
- Phylum: Arthropoda
- Clade: Pancrustacea
- Class: Insecta
- Order: Lepidoptera
- Family: Papilionidae
- Genus: Ornithoptera
- Species: O. euphorion

Binomial name
- Ornithoptera euphorion (Gray, 1852)
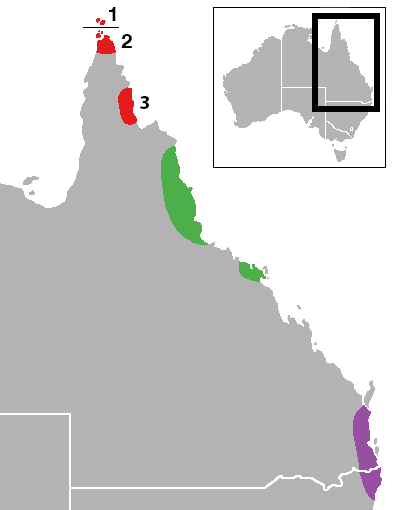
- Distribution of Ornithoptera euphorion (in green) and other species of Ornithoptera in Australia

Synonyms
- Troides euphorion; Troides priamus

= Ornithoptera euphorion =

Cairns birdwing

Species of birdwing butterfly

Ornithoptera euphorion, the Cairns birdwing, is a species of birdwing butterfly endemic to Queensland, and is Australia's largest endemic butterfly species. Other common names include Cooktown birdwing and northern birdwing. The names Cairns and Cooktown in its common name reference the Australian cities in the region where this butterfly is found.

== Description ==
The wingspan can be up to 15 cm (5.9 in) in females, and 12.5 cm (4.9 in) in males. A closely allied species, the New Guinea or Priam's birdwing (Ornithoptera priamus) reaches 19 cm (7.5 in) and is the largest butterfly species found in Australia, but it is not endemic. O. euphorion is quite closely related to O. richmondia, differing by its greater size and more extensive green markings in the male.

Males have a predominantly black upper wing with emerald green flashes, however the female lacks the green colouring, having a plain black upper wing with white patches. The female is the larger of the two sexes.

There was a spectacular and rare genetic mutation of this butterfly, where single aberrant female produced less than 40 aberrant progeny. The females were pale instead of dark, and the males were golden instead of green.

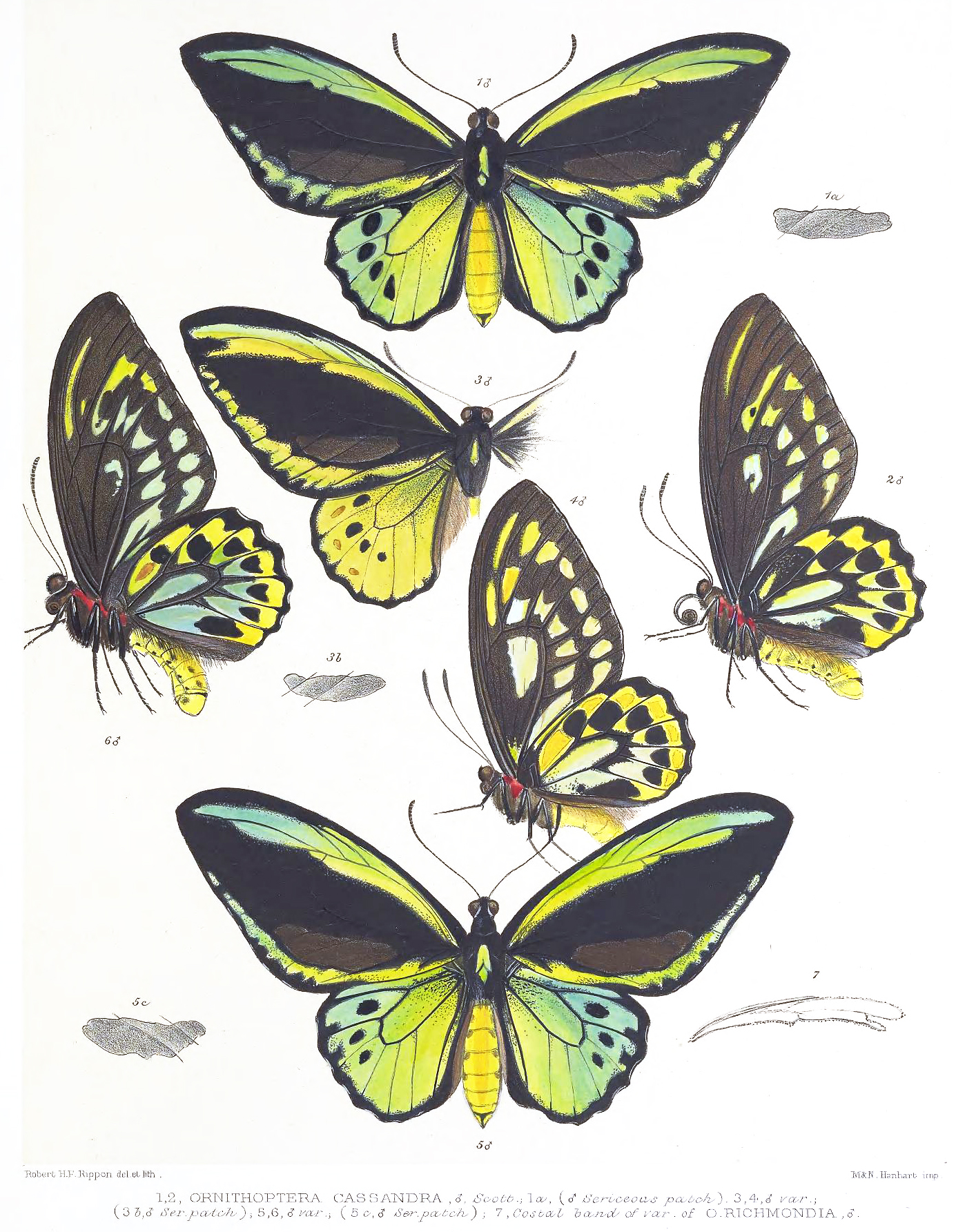
Male from Icones Ornithopterorum.

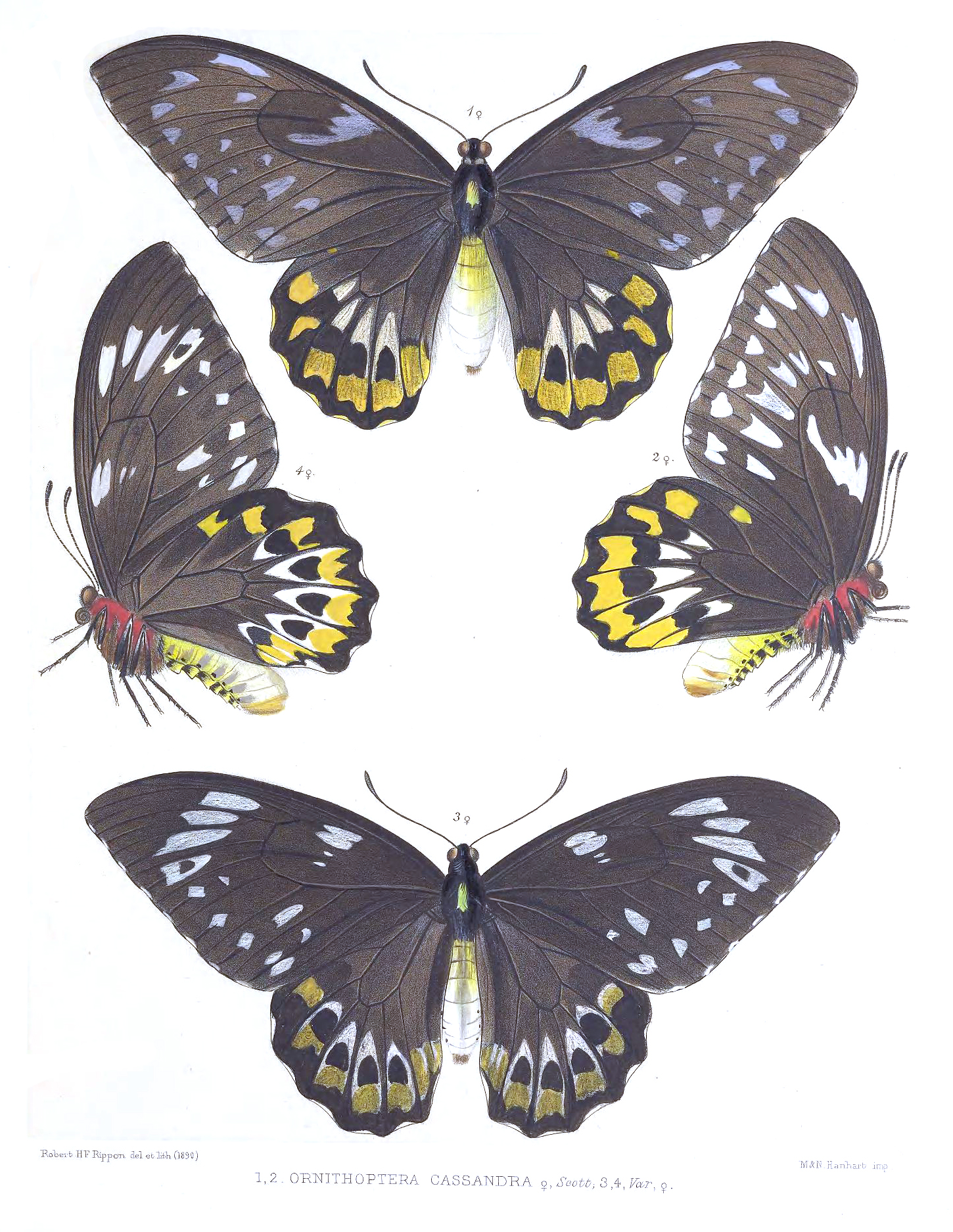
Female from Icones Ornithopterorum. Note the lack the green colouration.

== Distribution ==
Cairns birdwings are found southwards from Mount Webb and Cooktown to Mackay in Queensland. Its favoured habitat is rainforest of the Queensland wet tropics region, including riverine forest, and particularly near the coast. It is also often seen in Cairns, attracted to the flowers of Lantana, Hibiscus and Bougainvillea in suburban gardens.

The species is abundant throughout its range and is not threatened.

== Biology ==
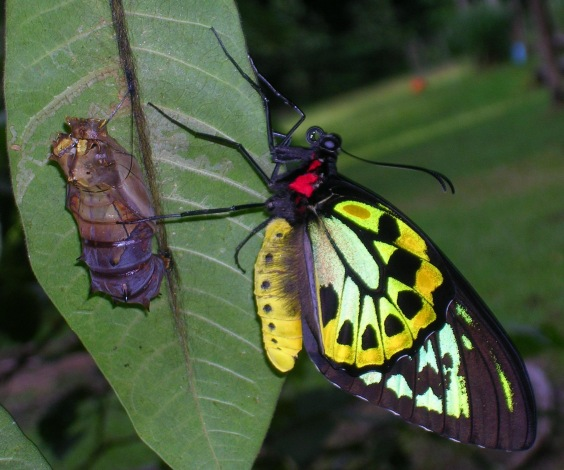
Adult male emerging from chrysalis

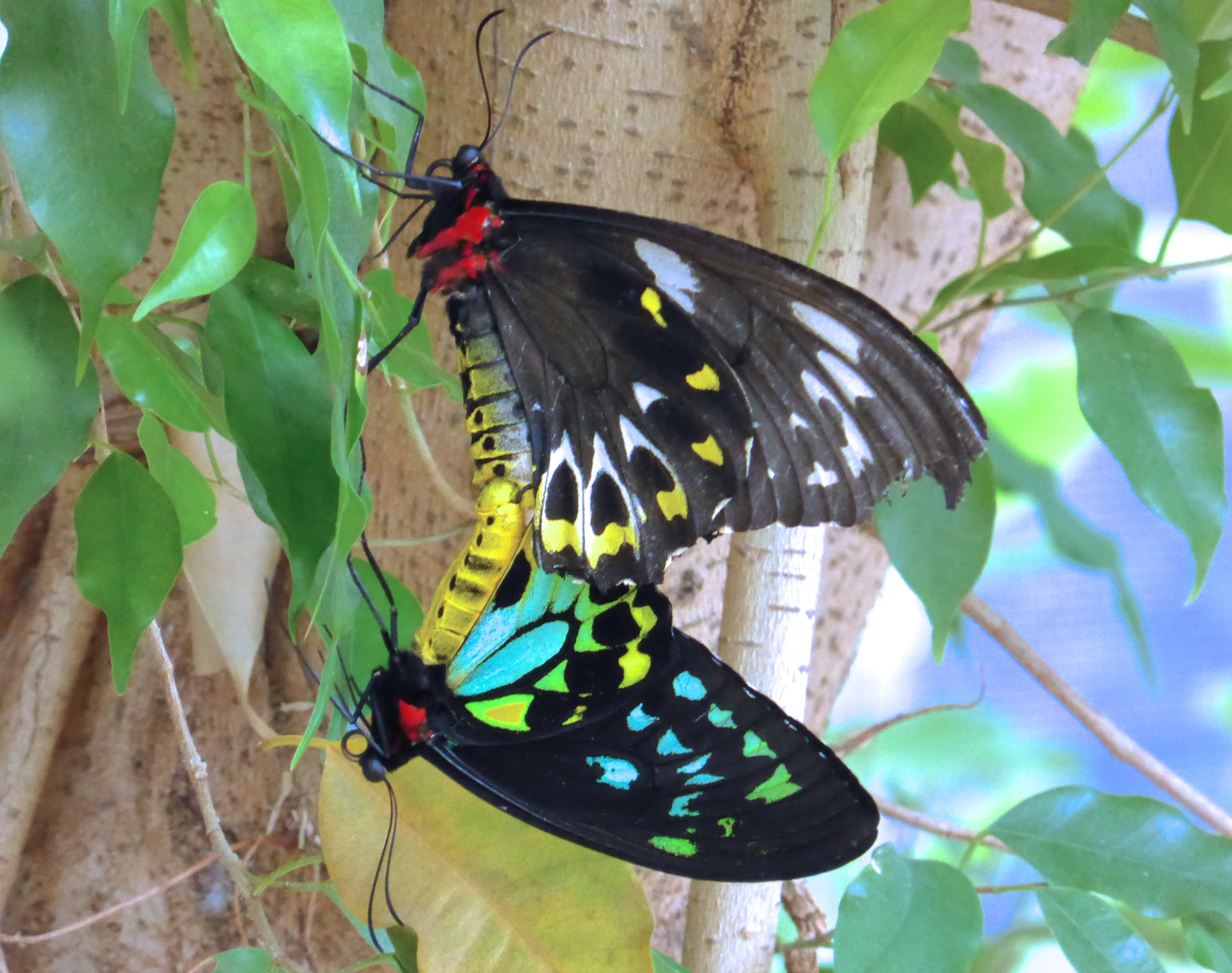
Copulating pair (female above, male below) at Melbourne Zoo

Ova: The eggs are very slightly larger than those of O. richmondia. A female may lay as many as 300 eggs in her lifetime.

Larva: Larvae are very similar to those of O. richmondia, with colouration varying from light to dark grey. Food plants known to be utilised by the larvae are Aristolochia acuminata, A. indica, A. pubera, A. thoszetti, A. australopithecurus, A. deltantha and A. sparusifolia. The leaves of the introduced Dutchman's pipe (Aristolochia littoralis) will kill the larvae of this species and several other swallowtail butterflies in Australia. Consequently, it is discouraged to plant Dutchman's pipe in Queensland, New South Wales and the Northern Territory.

Pupa: Like most other species of its genus, the pupa is light brown and yellow.

Imago: Adult males have been known to guard females with which they have recently mated, possibly to ensure that the sphragis (mating plug) does not become dislodged by another male, as it will not fully harden until approximately one day later.

Both sexes support their weight when feeding at flowers by rapidly fluttering their wings. Males occasionally compete for flowers with other nectarivores, such as small birds, and usually succeed at driving them off by aggressively flying towards them.

Adults are very likely to be unpalatable to vertebrates, due to feeding on Aristolochia as a larva, although they do sometimes fall prey to the golden silk orb-weaver spider.
