= Aristolochia delavayi =

Conservation status
- Endangered (IUCN 3.1)

Scientific classification
- Kingdom: Plantae
- Clade: Tracheophytes
- Clade: Angiosperms
- Clade: Magnoliids
- Order: Piperales
- Family: Aristolochiaceae
- Genus: Aristolochia
- Species: A. delavayi

Binomial name
- Aristolochia delavayi Franch.

Species of vine

Aristolochia delavayi is a species of flowering plant in the family Aristolochiaceae. It is endemic to China.
