= Aristolochia quangbinhensis =

Scientific classification
- Kingdom: Plantae
- Clade: Tracheophytes
- Clade: Angiosperms
- Clade: Magnoliids
- Order: Piperales
- Family: Aristolochiaceae
- Genus: Aristolochia
- Species: A. quangbinhensis

Binomial name
- Aristolochia quangbinhensis Truong Van Do, Trong Duc Nghiem, Stefan Wanke, Christoph Neinhui s

Species of vine

Aristolochia quangbinhensis (Vietnamese: Phòng Kỷ Quảng Bình) is an endemic flora species in the Aristolochia genus.

== Description ==
The species has petiole 1.5–2.5(–3) cm long; lamina elliptic to oblong-elliptic; peduncle 1.5–2 cm long, covered with yellow-brown trichomes; perianth limb bell-shaped, 2–2.5(–3) cm wide, exclusively purplish-pink on both sides, no blotches or veins are visible; perianth margins recurved; flower tube mouth slightly darker than the remaining perianth limb; perianth tube pale yellow to whitish and the entire back of the perianth limb and tube covered with yellow-brown trichomes.

In the humid region of the northeastern mountains in Phong Nha-Ke Bang National Park, Quang Binh province, Aristolochia quangbinhensis grows as a single population underneath the primary, broad-leaved, evergreen forest. Anthropogenic threats, such as excessive logging, have resulted in the vulnerability of this new flora species and put it in an endangered status.
