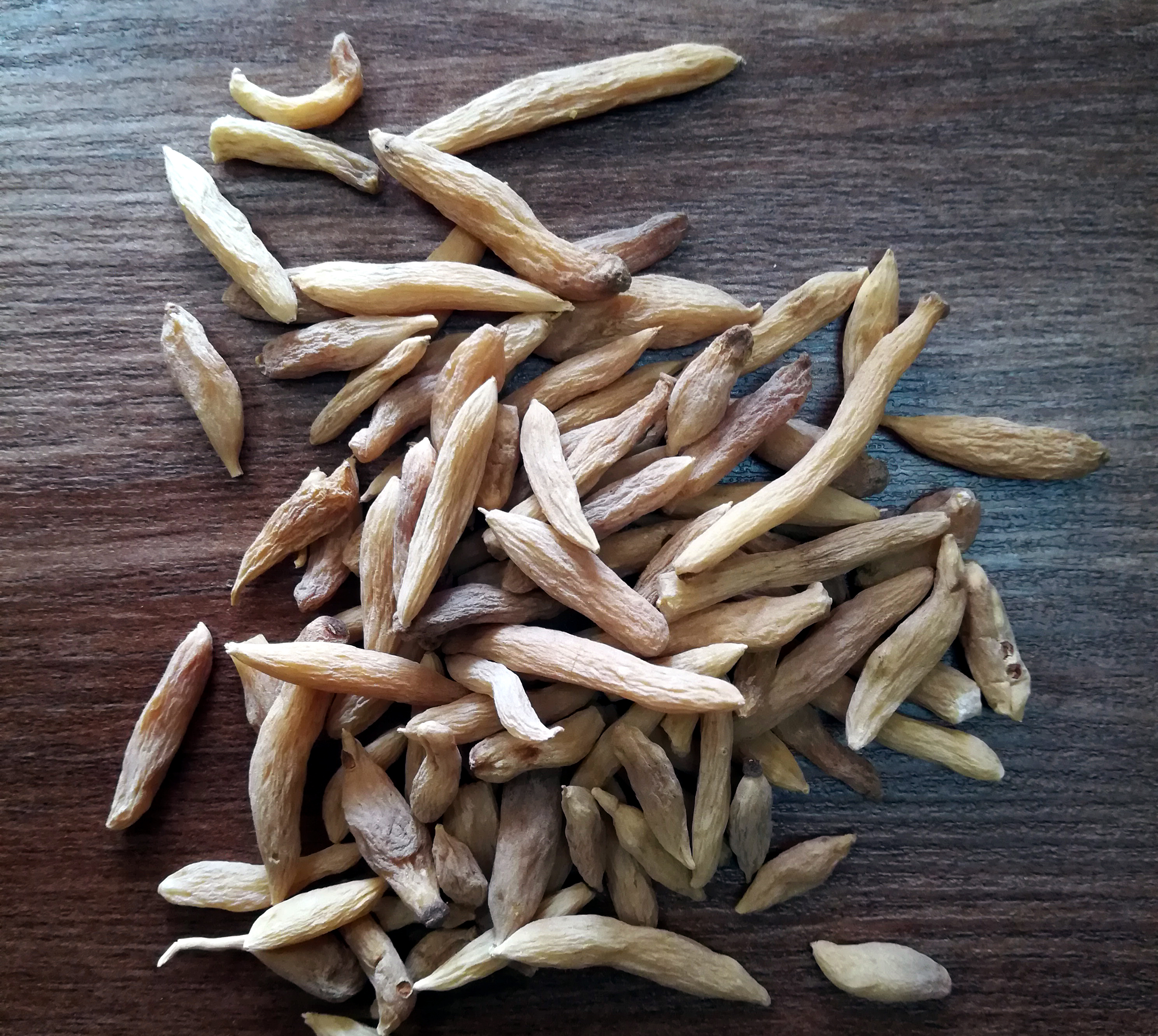

Scientific classification
- Kingdom: Plantae
- Clade: Tracheophytes
- Clade: Angiosperms
- Clade: Magnoliids
- Order: Piperales
- Family: Aristolochiaceae
- Genus: Aristolochia
- Species: A. longa

Binomial name
- Aristolochia longa L.

= Aristolochia longa =

Species of vine

Aristolochia longa or long aristolochia is a species of pipevine.

Like all plants in the Aristolochia genus, Aristolochia longa contains aristolochic acid, a carcinogenic and nephrotoxic substance.

Historically, plants within the Aristolochia genus were used to treat a wide variety of ailments. The fact that their use leads to kidney failure was only discovered in 1815. Various species of Aristolochia including Aristolochia longa remain in use in some forms of traditional medicine. Essential oil extracted from the roots of Aristolochia longa has various antimicrobial properties.

According to one study conducted in Morocco, 63 cases of kidney poisoning were reported to the Antipoison and Pharmacovigilance Center of Morocco between 2011 and 2018, 76% of which were due to the consumption of Aristolochia longa, most often as part of an attempt to treat cancer through traditional medicine.

== Sources ==
- Dhouioui, Mouna; Boulila, Abdennacer; Chaabane, Hedia; Zina, Mongia Saïd; Casabianca, Hervé (2016). "Seasonal changes in essential oil composition of Aristolochia longa L. ssp. paucinervis Batt. (Aristolochiaceae) roots and its antimicrobial activity". Industrial Crops and Products. 83: 301–306. doi:10.1016/j.indcrop.2016.01.025.
- Huang, Tzu-Chuan; Chen, Shih-Ming; Li, Yi-Chieh; Lee, Jen-Ai (2014). "Increased renal semicarbazide-sensitive amine oxidase activity and methylglyoxal levels in aristolochic acid-induced nephrotoxicity". Life Sciences. 114 (1): 4–11. doi:10.1016/j.lfs.2014.07.034.
- Nchinech, Naoual; Khalfaoui, Hasnae; Chabat, Abderrahim; Rhalem, Naima; Bencheikh, Rachida Soulaymani; Achour, Sanae; Bousliman, Yassir; Nejjari, Rachid; Zakariya, Imane (2024). "Overview of medicinal plants-induced nephrotoxicity: A national pharmacovigilance study from Morocco". Toxicologie Analytique et Clinique. doi:10.1016/j.toxac.2024.01.002.
- Scarborough, John; Fernandes, Andrea (2011). "Ancient Medicinal Use of Aristolochia: Birthwort's Tradition and Toxicity". Pharmacy in History. 53 (1): 3–21. JSTOR 23645794. PMID 22702021.
