= Aristolochia yunnanensis =

Conservation status
- Vulnerable (IUCN 3.1)

Scientific classification
- Kingdom: Plantae
- Clade: Tracheophytes
- Clade: Angiosperms
- Clade: Magnoliids
- Order: Piperales
- Family: Aristolochiaceae
- Genus: Aristolochia
- Species: A. yunnanensis

Binomial name
- Aristolochia yunnanensis Franch.

Species of plant

Aristolochia yunnanensis is a species of plant in the family Aristolochiaceae. It is endemic to China.
