= Aristolochia utriformis =

Conservation status
- Critically Endangered (IUCN 3.1)

Scientific classification
- Kingdom: Plantae
- Clade: Tracheophytes
- Clade: Angiosperms
- Clade: Magnoliids
- Order: Piperales
- Family: Aristolochiaceae
- Genus: Aristolochia
- Species: A. utriformis

Binomial name
- Aristolochia utriformis S.M.Hwang

Synonyms
- Isotrema utriforme (S.M.Hwang) X.X.Zhu, S.Liao & J.S.Ma

Species of plant

Aristolochia utriformis is a species of plant in the family Aristolochiaceae. It is native to Yunnan province of south-central China and northwestern Vietnam. It is found in forests at about 1900 meters in Yunnan Province. The plants are climbing herbs or shrubs that have pointed leaves with heart shaped bases. The yellow-green flowers are tube shaped and bent. They hang from the base of a leaf.
