= Aristolochia stevensii =

Scientific classification
- Kingdom: Plantae
- Clade: Tracheophytes
- Clade: Angiosperms
- Clade: Magnoliids
- Order: Piperales
- Family: Aristolochiaceae
- Genus: Aristolochia
- Species: A. stevensii

Binomial name
- Aristolochia stevensii Barringer

Species of vine

Aristolochia stevensii is a plant species native to northwestern Nicaragua and southwestern Honduras. It grows in wet montane forests.

Aristolochia stevensii is a liana climbing over other vegetation. Stems are woody, up to 2 cm in diameter, the bark tomentose when young, corky when older. Leaves are ovate, up to 17 cm long. Flowers are borne in racemes in the axils of the leaves, dull yellow with a purple center.
