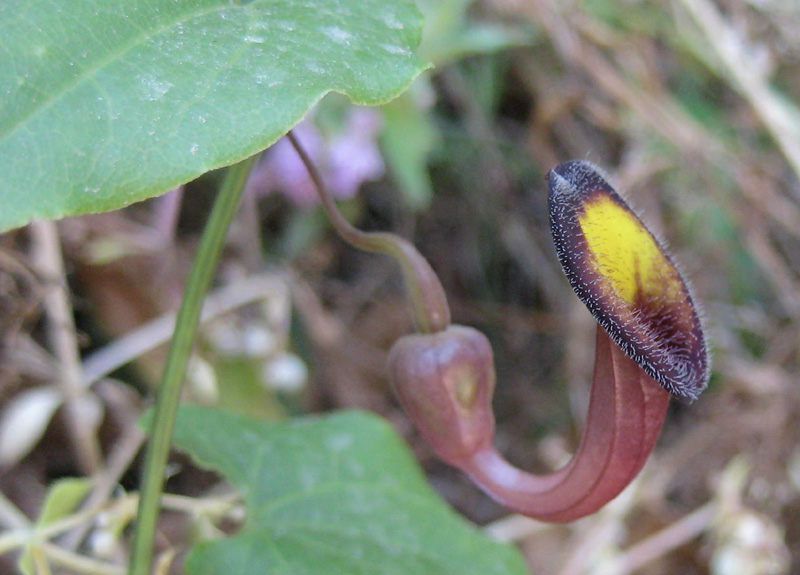

Scientific classification
- Kingdom: Plantae
- Clade: Tracheophytes
- Clade: Angiosperms
- Clade: Magnoliids
- Order: Piperales
- Family: Aristolochiaceae
- Genus: Aristolochia
- Species: A. sempervirens

Binomial name
- Aristolochia sempervirens Linnaeus 1753

= Aristolochia sempervirens =

Species of vine

Aristolochia sempervirens is a species of perennial plant in the family Aristolochiaceae. It is found in the Eastern and Southern Mediterranean Basin, notably in Crete.

== Description ==
Aristolochia sempervirens is an evergreen and woody climbing plant that grows up to 5 meters tall. The leaves are ovate-lanceolate, leathery and glabrous. They are deeply heart-shaped at the base and slightly eared. The flowers are yellow with purple stripes and 2 to 5 centimeters long. The tube is U-shaped.

The flowering period extends from March to July.

The chromosome number is 2n = 14

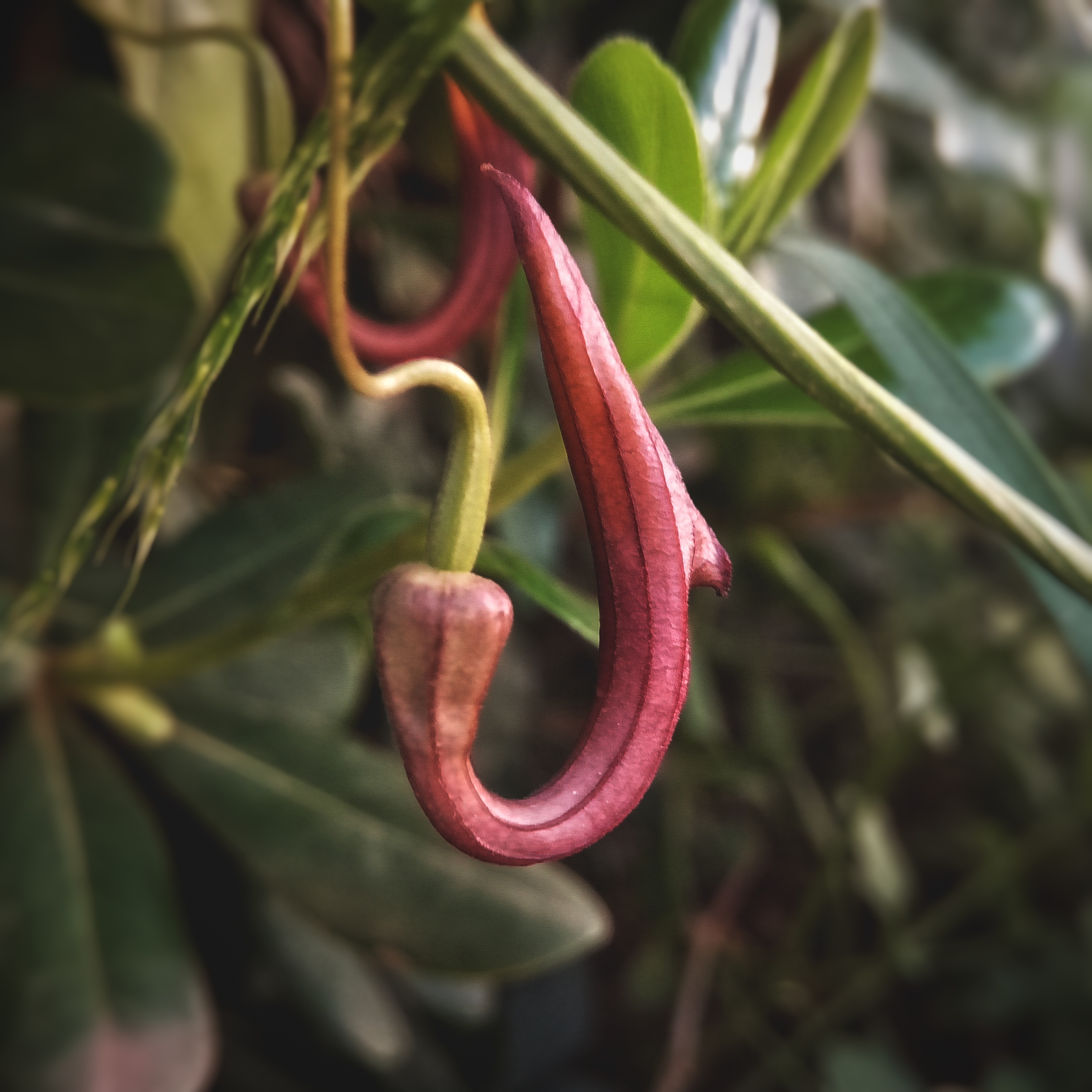

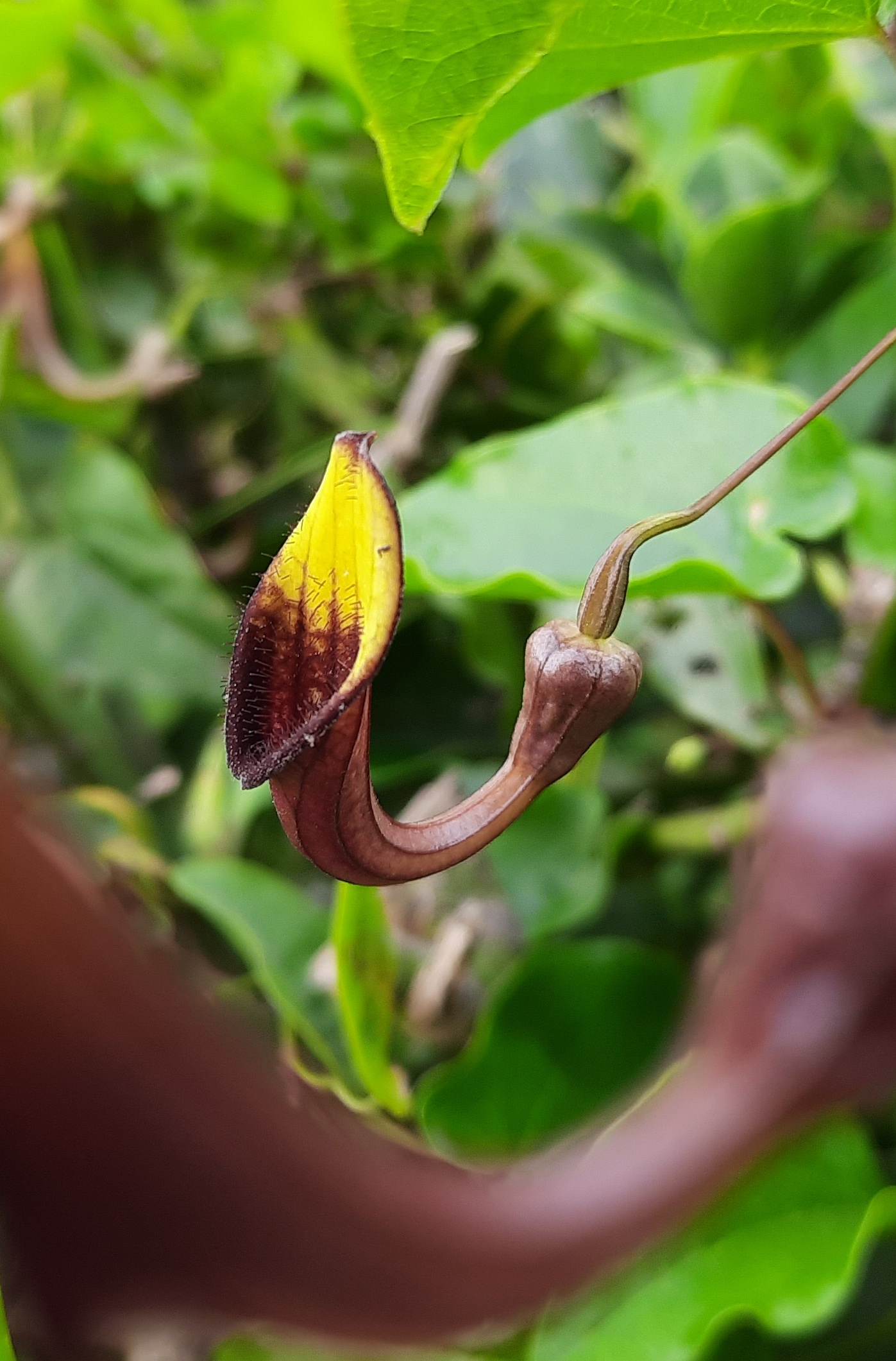

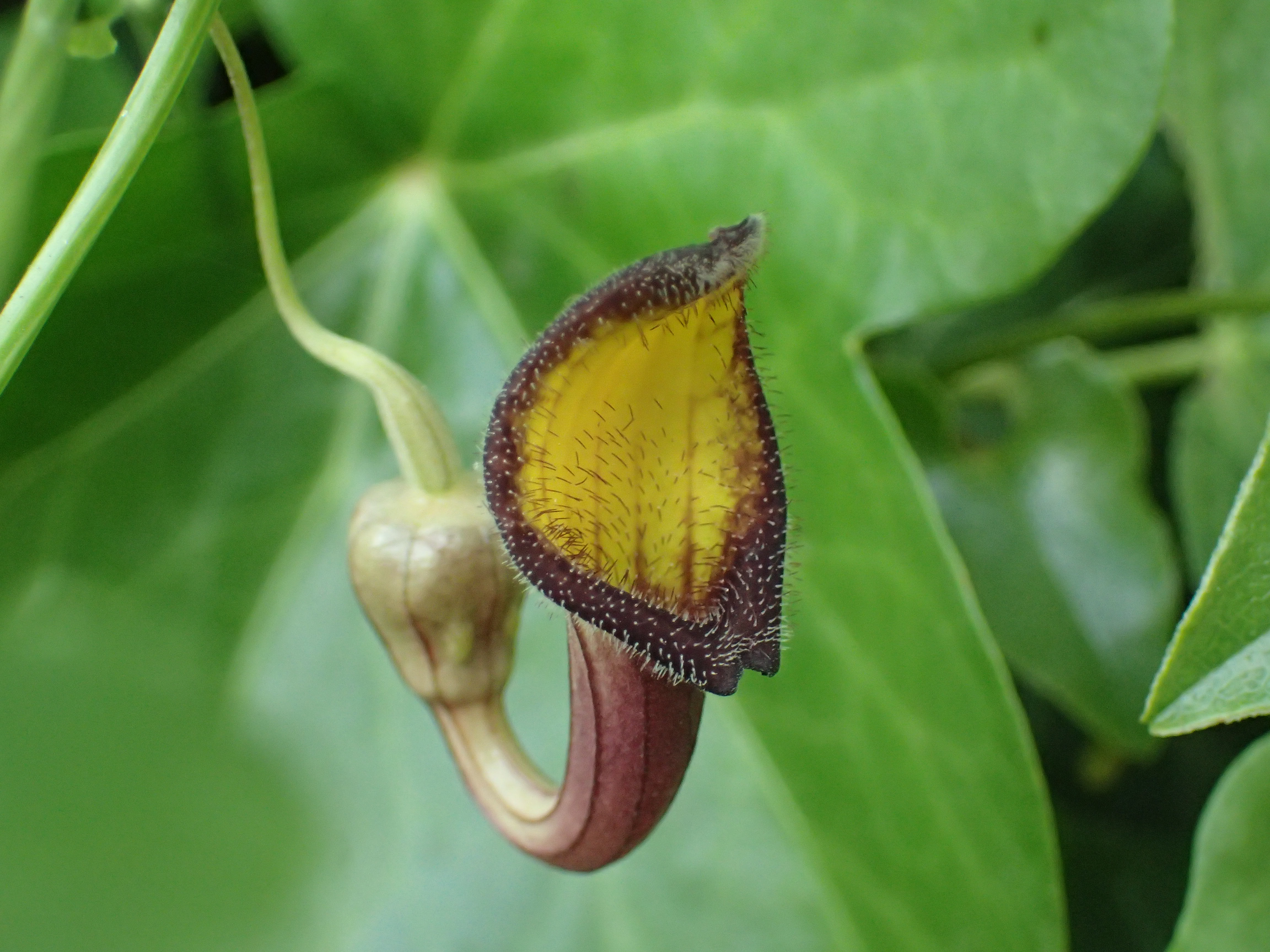

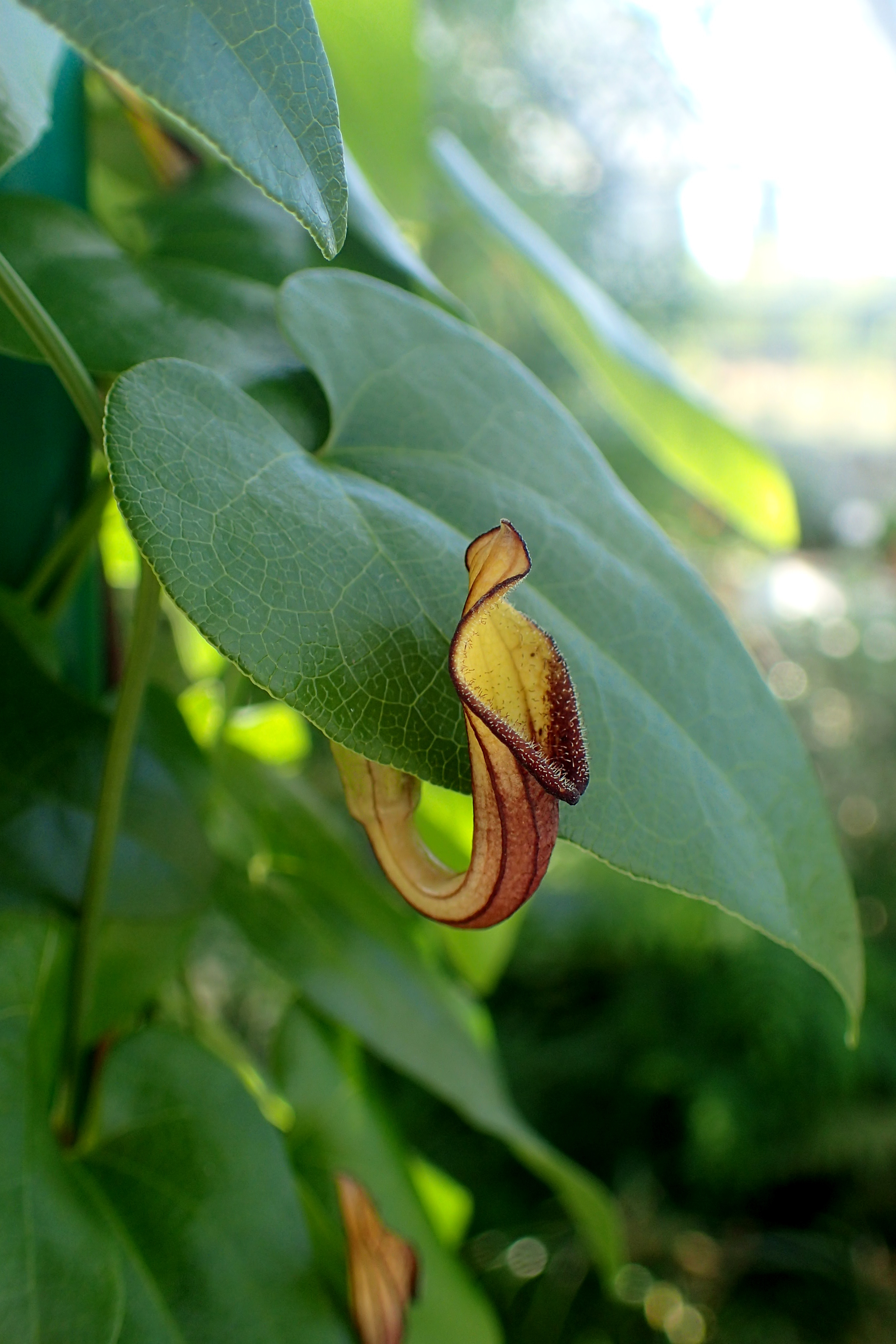

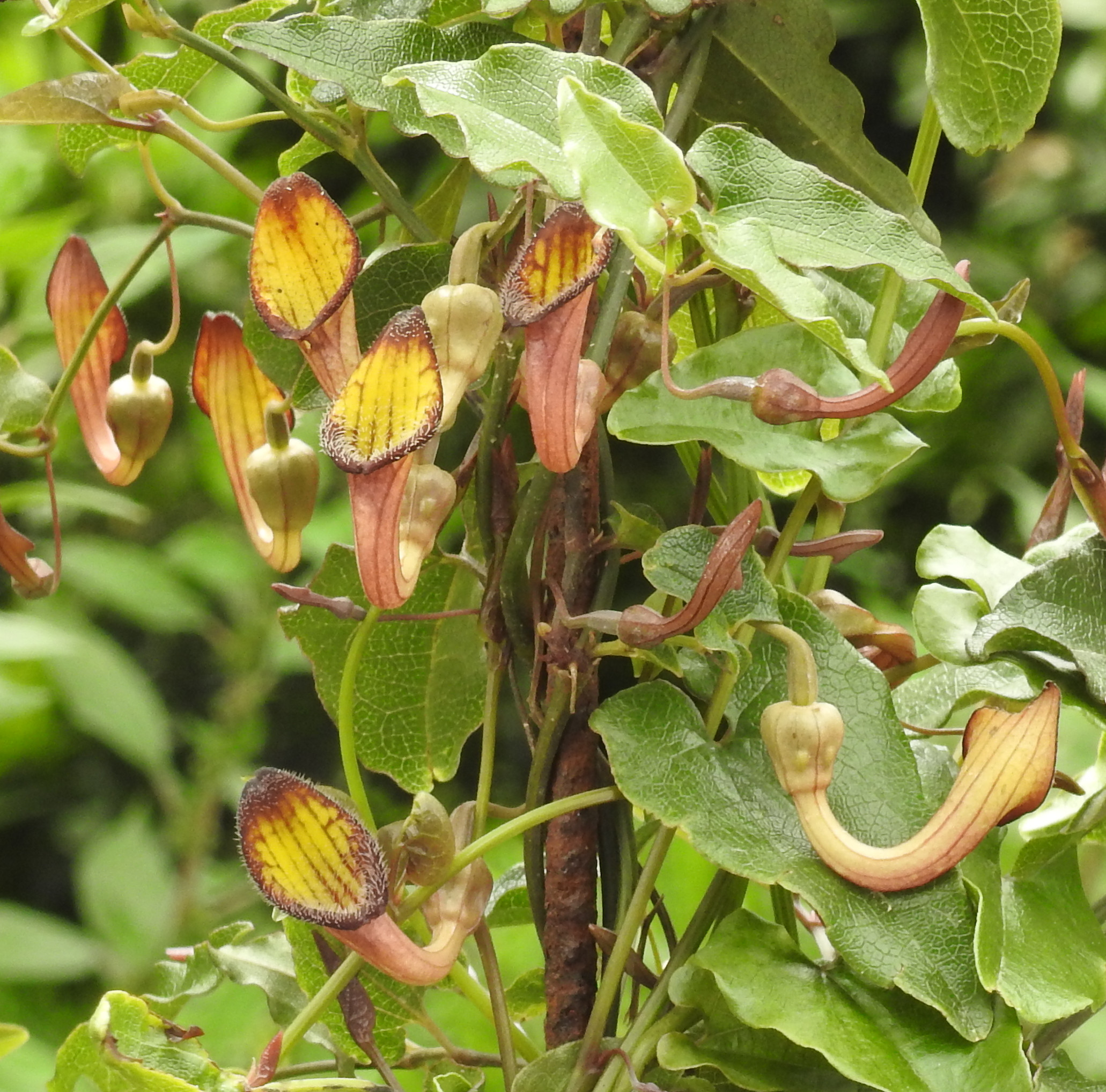
