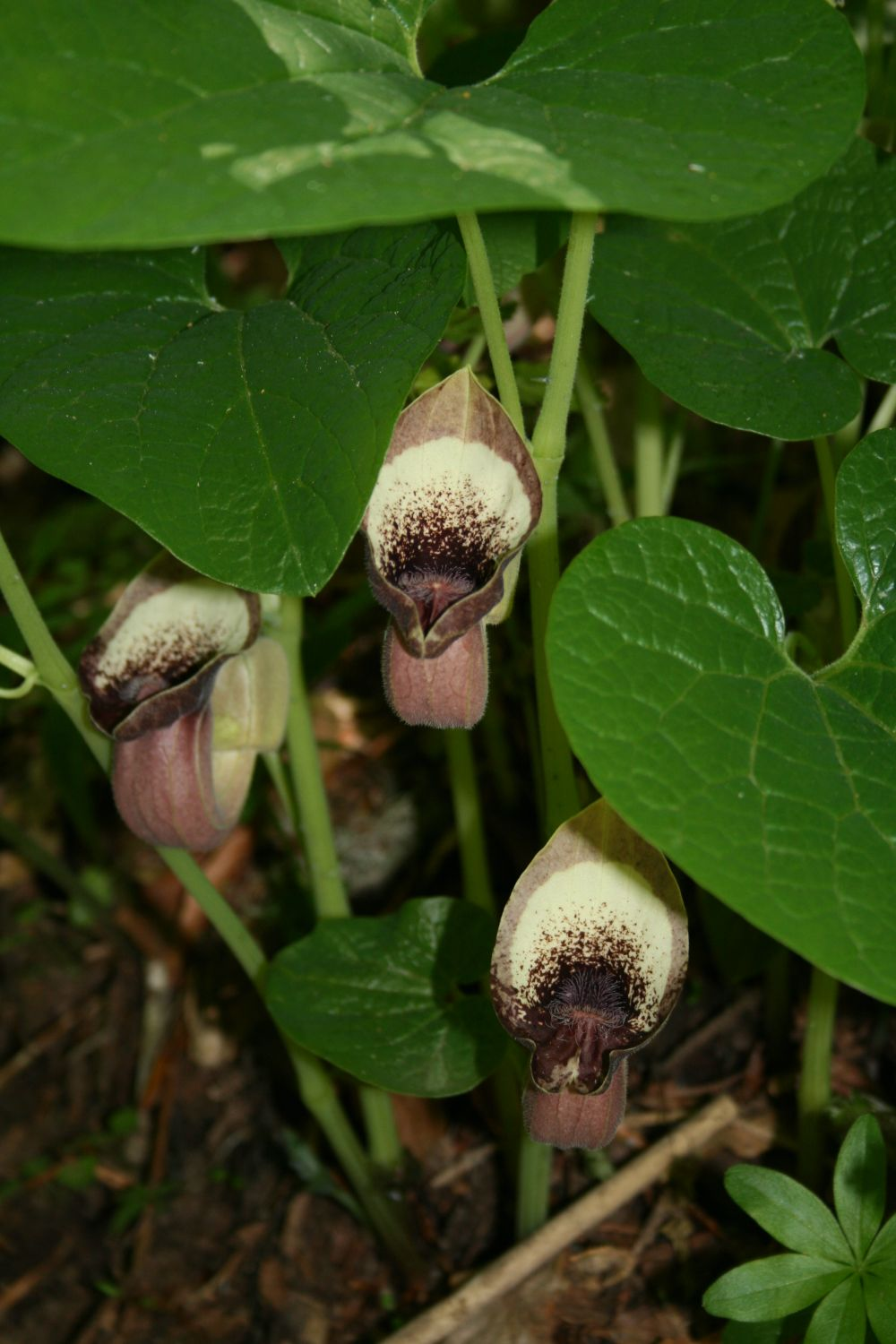

Scientific classification
- Kingdom: Plantae
- Clade: Tracheophytes
- Clade: Angiosperms
- Clade: Magnoliids
- Order: Piperales
- Family: Aristolochiaceae
- Genus: Aristolochia
- Species: A. pontica

Binomial name
- Aristolochia pontica Lam.

= Aristolochia pontica =

Species of vine

Aristolochia pontica is a species of perennial plant in the family Aristolochiaceae. It is found in the Republic of Georgia, Turkey, Lebanon, and Greece. commonly known as Pontic birthwort, is an erect herbaceous perennial plant in the birthwort family Aristolochiaceae, characterized by its tuberous, stoutly cylindrical rootstock and growth in clumps up to 50 cm tall. It grows primarily in the temperate biome.
