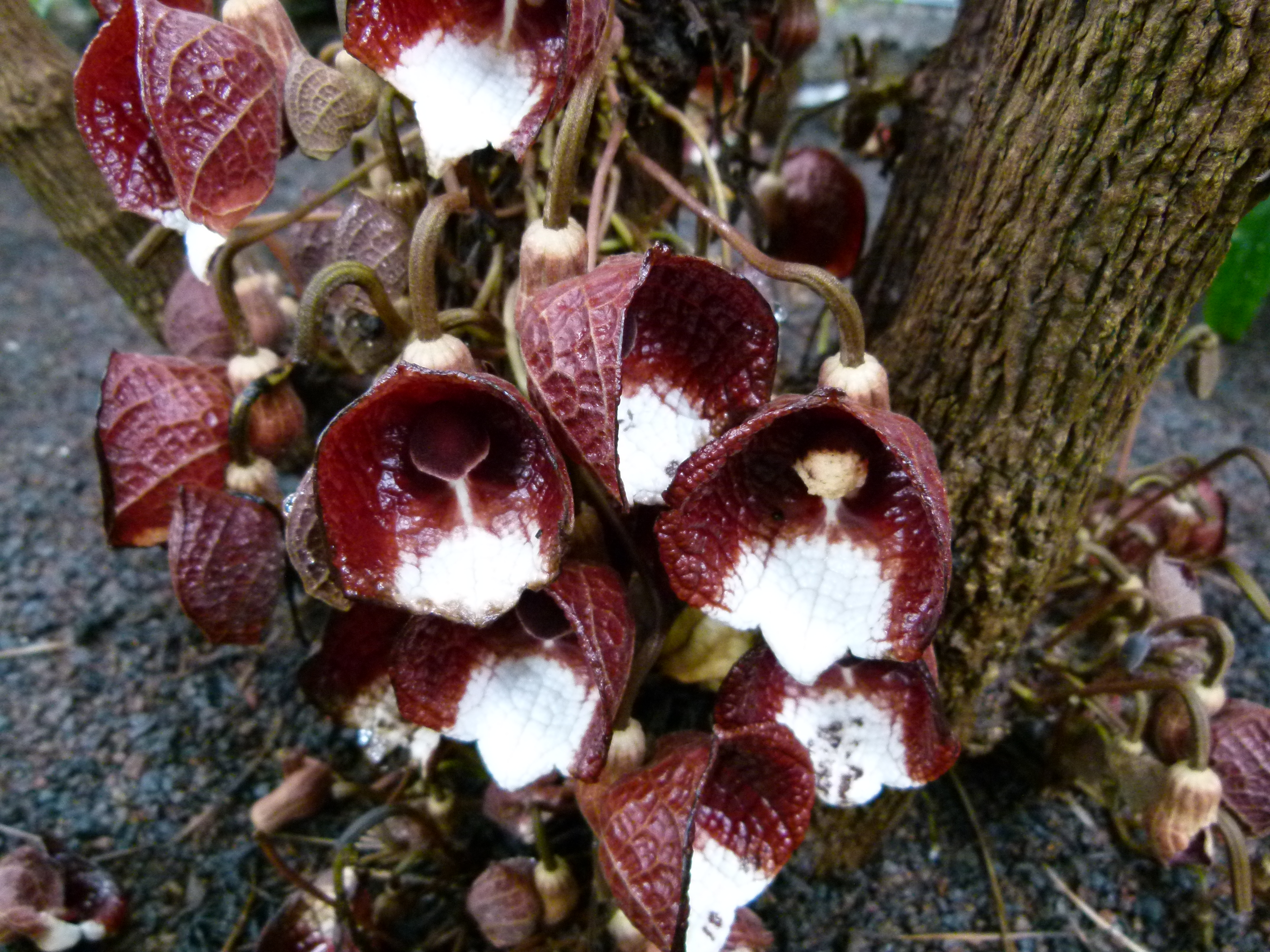

Conservation status
- Vulnerable (IUCN 3.1)

Scientific classification
- Kingdom: Plantae
- Clade: Tracheophytes
- Clade: Angiosperms
- Clade: Magnoliids
- Order: Piperales
- Family: Aristolochiaceae
- Genus: Aristolochia
- Species: A. arborea

Binomial name
- Aristolochia arborea Linden
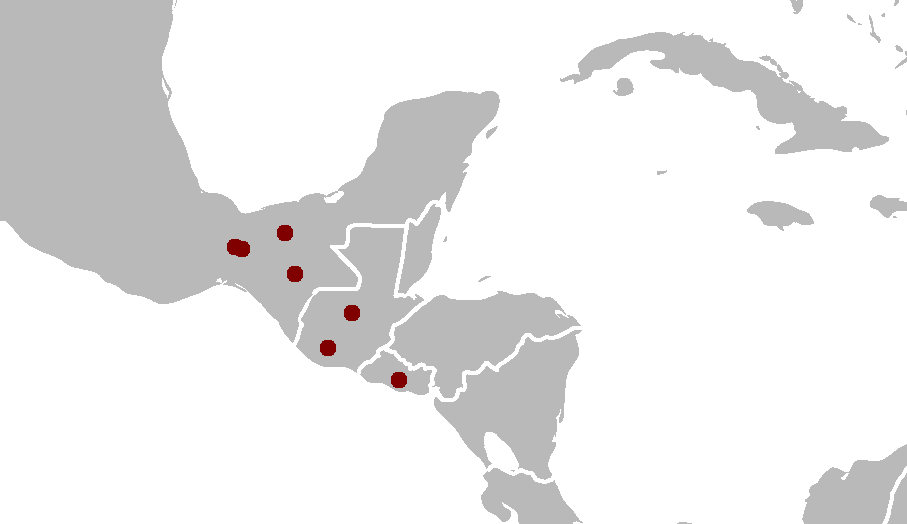
- Aristolochia arborea range

Synonyms
- Isotrema arboreum (Linden) Eb.Fisch.

= Aristolochia arborea =

Species of vine

Aristolochia arborea is a species of perennial plant in the family Aristolochiaceae. It is found from Mexico through Guatemala and El Salvador .
