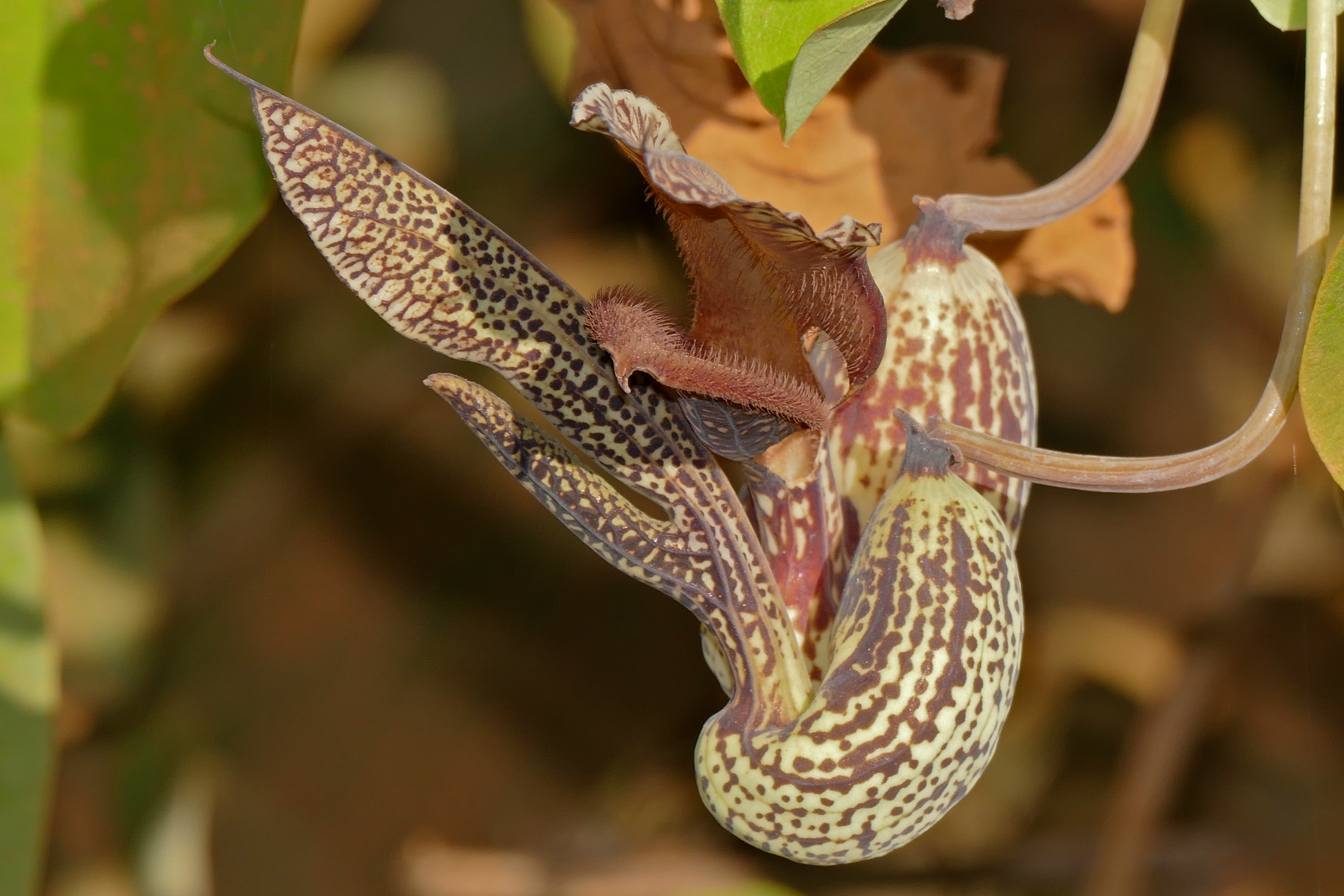

Scientific classification
- Kingdom: Plantae
- Clade: Tracheophytes
- Clade: Angiosperms
- Clade: Magnoliids
- Order: Piperales
- Family: Aristolochiaceae
- Genus: Aristolochia
- Species: A. esperanzae

Binomial name
- Aristolochia esperanzae Kuntze 1898

Synonyms
- Aristolochia boliviensis Kuntze; Aristolochia esperanzae fo. minor W. Hoehne

= Aristolochia esperanzae =

Species of plant

Aristolochia esperanzae is a species of Aristolochia found in Argentina, Bolivia, and Paraguay
