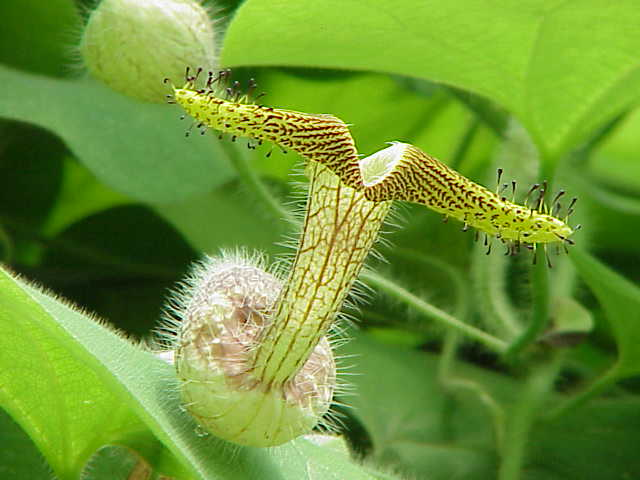

Scientific classification
- Kingdom: Plantae
- Clade: Tracheophytes
- Clade: Angiosperms
- Clade: Magnoliids
- Order: Piperales
- Family: Aristolochiaceae
- Genus: Aristolochia
- Species: A. eriantha

Binomial name
- Aristolochia eriantha Mart. 1824

= Aristolochia eriantha =

Species of vine

Aristolochia eriantha is a species of perennial plant in the family Aristolochiaceae. It is found in Bolivia.

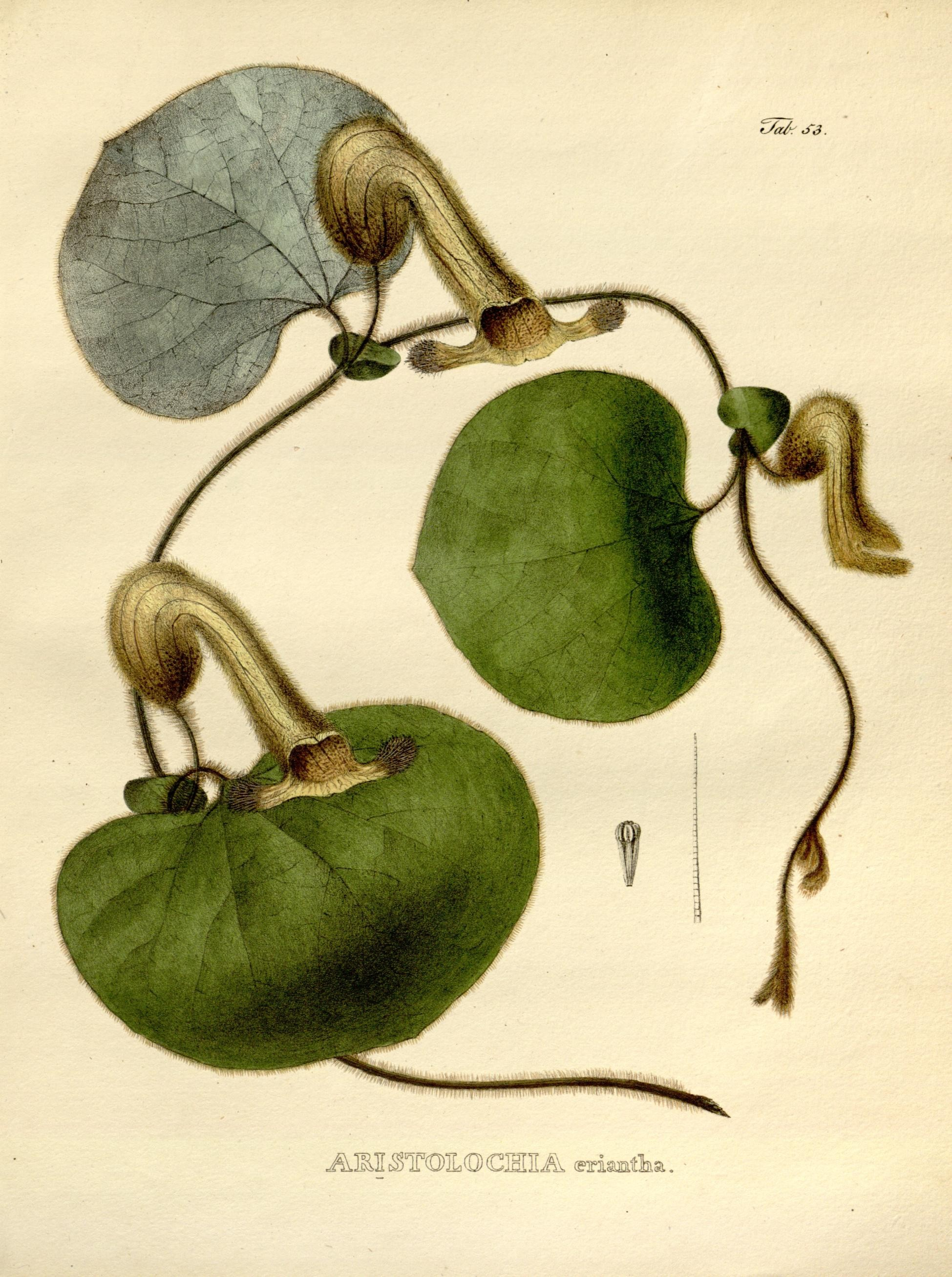
Illustration showing plant details.
