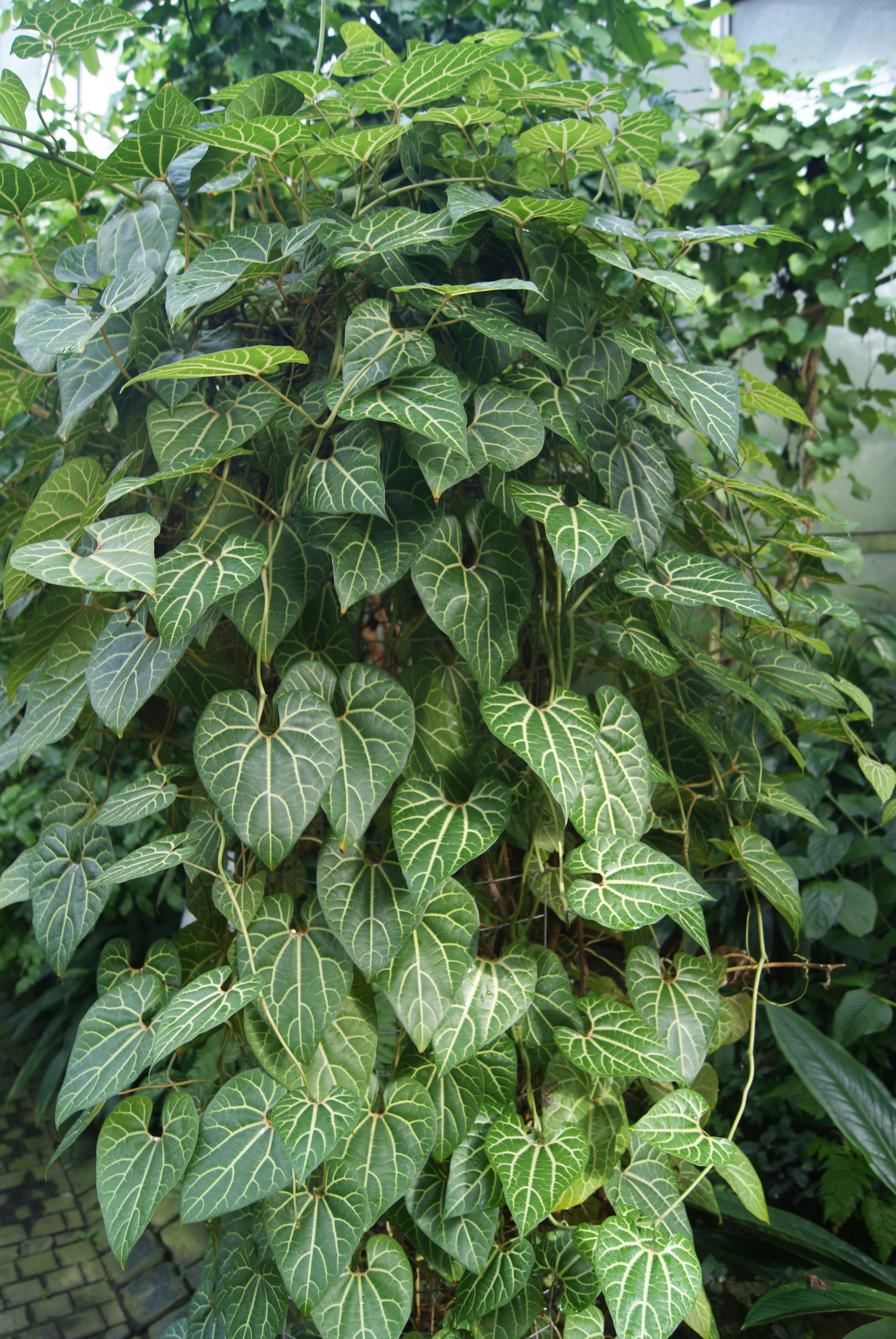

Scientific classification
- Kingdom: Plantae
- Clade: Tracheophytes
- Clade: Angiosperms
- Clade: Magnoliids
- Order: Piperales
- Family: Aristolochiaceae
- Genus: Aristolochia
- Species: A. cauliflora

Binomial name
- Aristolochia cauliflora Ule 1905

= Aristolochia cauliflora =

Species of plant

Aristolochia cauliflora is a species of Aristolochia found in Ecuador and Peru
