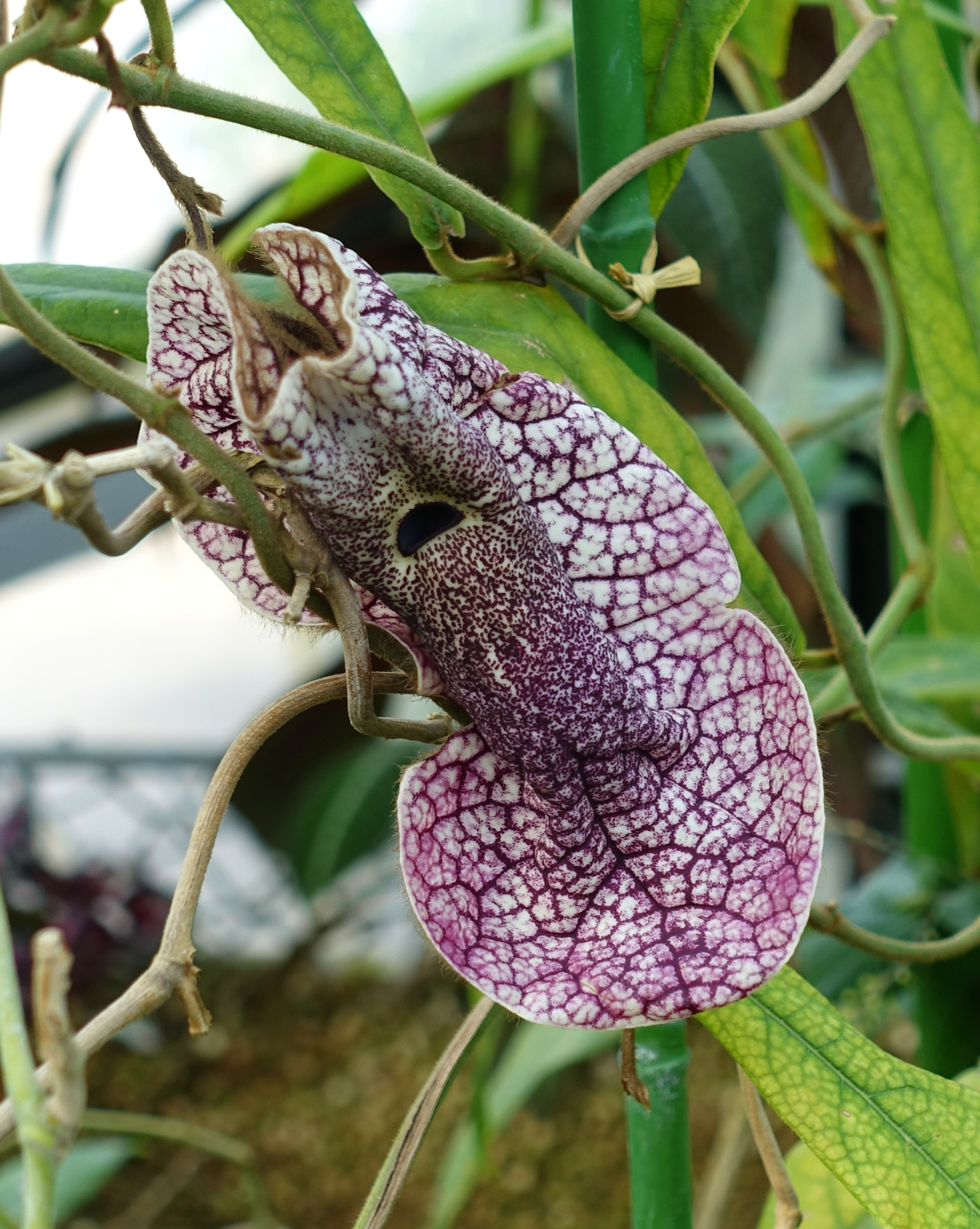

Conservation status
- Critically Endangered (IUCN 3.1)

Scientific classification
- Kingdom: Plantae
- Clade: Tracheophytes
- Clade: Angiosperms
- Clade: Magnoliids
- Order: Piperales
- Family: Aristolochiaceae
- Genus: Aristolochia
- Species: A. westlandii

Binomial name
- Aristolochia westlandii Hemsl.

Synonyms
- Isotrema westlandii (Hemsl.) H.Huber

= Aristolochia westlandii =

Species of plant

Aristolochia westlandii is a species of plant in the family Aristolochiaceae. It is native to southeastern China, in valley forests in Hong Kong and Guangdong Province at an elevation of 300 to 800 metres (980 to 2,620 ft). The leaves are long, narrow and pointed (12–20 centimetres [4.7–7.9 in]). The flowers are bent tubes from 10–15 centimetres (3.9–5.9 in) long that grow from the base of a leaf. They are yellow with purple veins and blotches.
