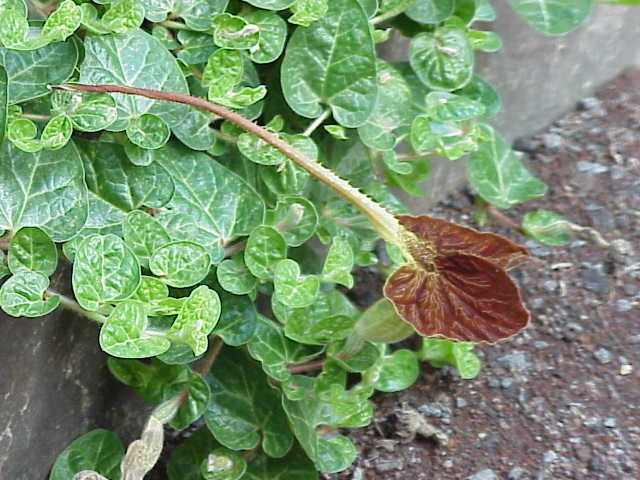

Scientific classification
- Kingdom: Plantae
- Clade: Tracheophytes
- Clade: Angiosperms
- Clade: Magnoliids
- Order: Piperales
- Family: Aristolochiaceae
- Genus: Aristolochia
- Species: A. lindneri

Binomial name
- Aristolochia lindneri A.Berger

= Aristolochia lindneri =

Species of plant in the family Aristolochiaceae

Aristolochia lindneri is a species of perennial plant in the family Aristolochiaceae. It is found in Santa Cruz, Bolivia.
