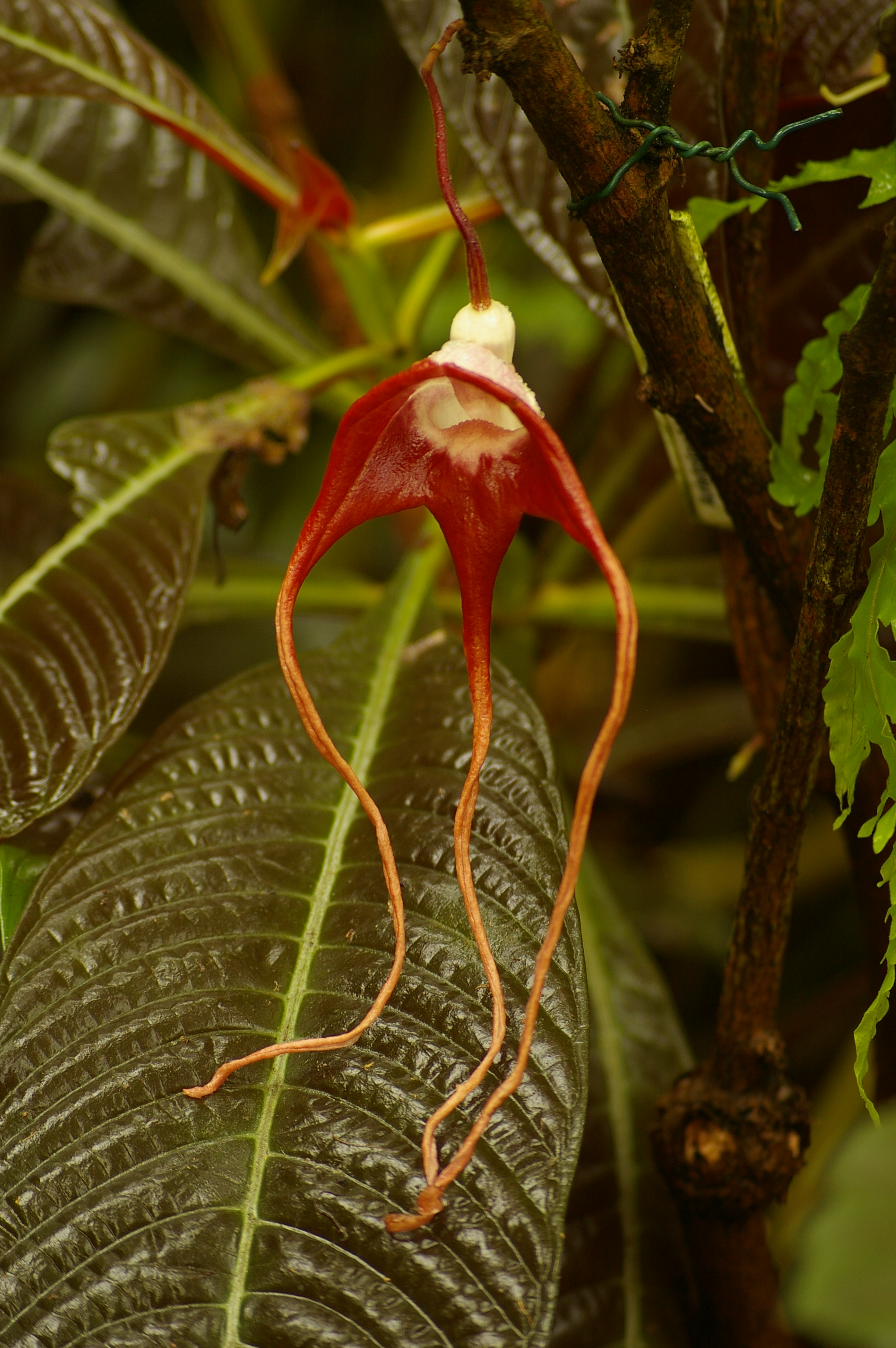

Scientific classification
- Kingdom: Plantae
- Clade: Tracheophytes
- Clade: Angiosperms
- Clade: Magnoliids
- Order: Piperales
- Family: Aristolochiaceae
- Genus: Aristolochia
- Species: A. tricaudata

Binomial name
- Aristolochia tricaudata Lem. 1865

= Aristolochia tricaudata =

Species of vine

Aristolochia tricaudata is a species of perennial plant in the family Aristolochiaceae. It is found in Chiapas and Oaxaca, Mexico.
