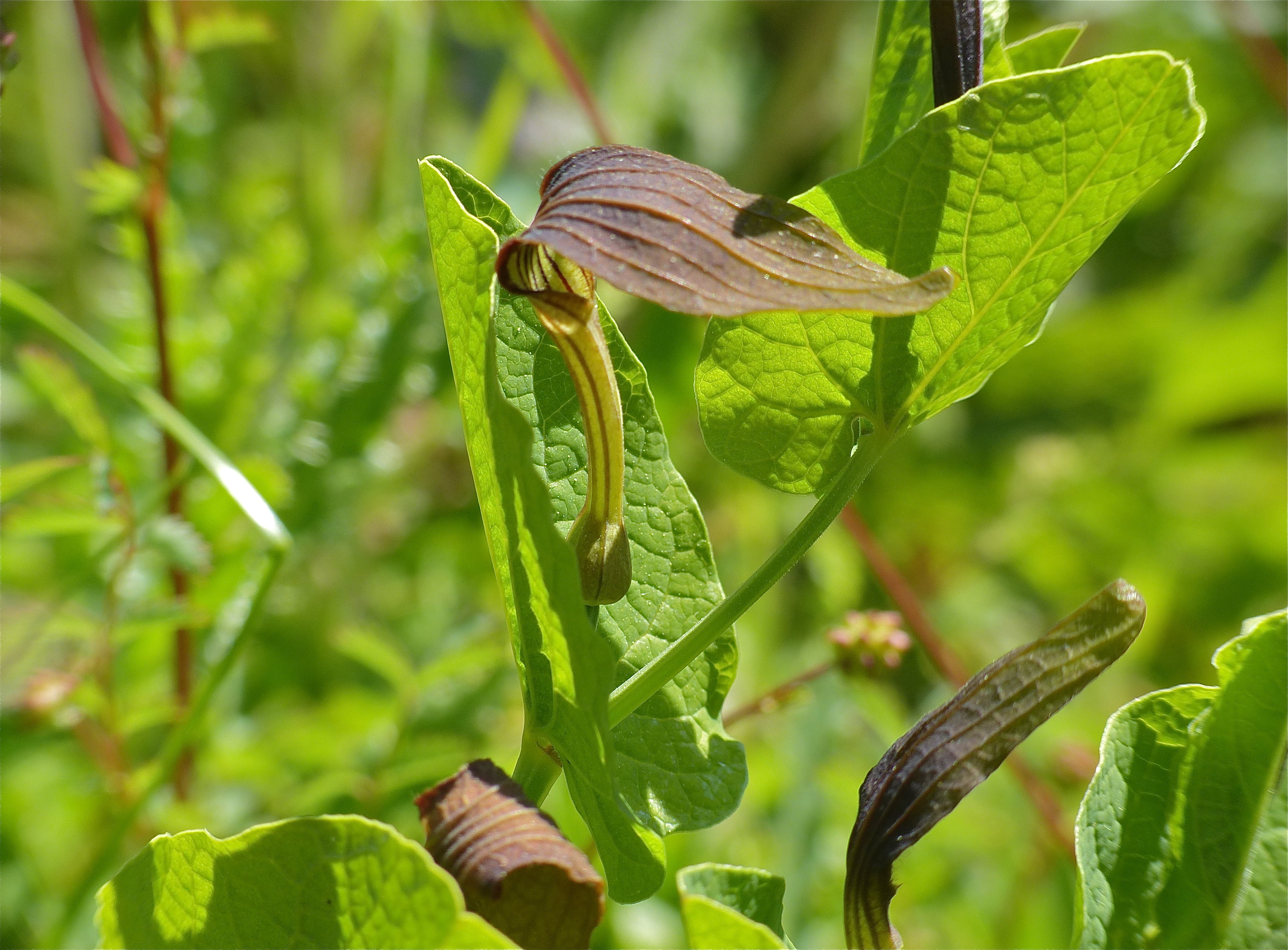
- Aristolochia rotunda, the type species of Aristolochia

Scientific classification
- Kingdom: Plantae
- Clade: Embryophytes
- Clade: Tracheophytes
- Clade: Angiosperms
- Clade: Magnoliids
- Order: Piperales
- Family: Aristolochiaceae
- Subfamily: Aristolochioideae
- Genus: Aristolochia; L.

Species
- Over 500, see text

Synonyms
- Hocquartia Dum. Holostylis Duch., Ann. Sci. Nat., Bot. sér. 4, 2: 33, t. 5. 1854. Isotrema Raf. (disputed)

= Aristolochia =

Genus of flowering plants

Aristolochia (English: /əˌrɪstəˈloʊkiə/) is a large plant genus with over 500 species that is the type genus of the family Aristolochiaceae. Its members are commonly known as birthwort, pipevine or Dutchman's pipe and are widespread and occur in diverse climates. Some species, like A. utriformis and A. westlandii, are threatened with extinction.

The genus Isotrema is usually included here as Aristolochia subgenus Siphisia, but might be a valid genus. It contains the species with a three-lobed calyx.

== Description ==
Aristolochia is a genus of evergreen and deciduous lianas (woody vines) and herbaceous perennials. The smooth stem is erect or somewhat twining. The simple leaves are alternate and cordate, membranous, growing on leaf stalks. There are no stipules.

The flowers grow in the leaf axils. They are inflated and globose at the base, continuing as a long perianth tube, ending in a tongue-shaped, brightly colored lobe. There is no corolla. The calyx is one to three whorled, and three to six toothed. The sepals are united (gamosepalous). There are six to 40 stamens in one whorl. They are united with the style, forming a gynostemium. The ovary is inferior and is four to six locular.

These flowers have a specialized pollination mechanism. The plants are aromatic and their strong scent attracts insects. The inner part of the perianth tube is covered with hairs, acting as a fly-trap. These hairs then wither to release the fly, covered with pollen.

The fruit is a dehiscent capsule with many endospermic seeds.

The common names Dutchman's pipe and pipevine (e.g. common pipevine, A. durior) are an allusion to old-fashioned meerschaum pipes at one time common in the Netherlands and northern Germany. Birthwort (e.g. European birthwort A. clematitis) refers to these species' flower shape, resembling a birth canal. Aristolochia was first described by the 4th c. BC Greek philosopher and botanist Theophrastus in his ‘’Inquiry of Plants’’ [IX.8.3], and the scientific name Aristolochia was developed from Ancient Greek aristos (άριστος) "best" + locheia (λοχεία), childbirth or childbed, relating to its known ancient use in childbirth. The Roman orator Cicero records a different tradition, that the plant was named after an otherwise unknown Greek person with the name Aristolochos, who had learned from a dream that it was an antidote for snake bites.

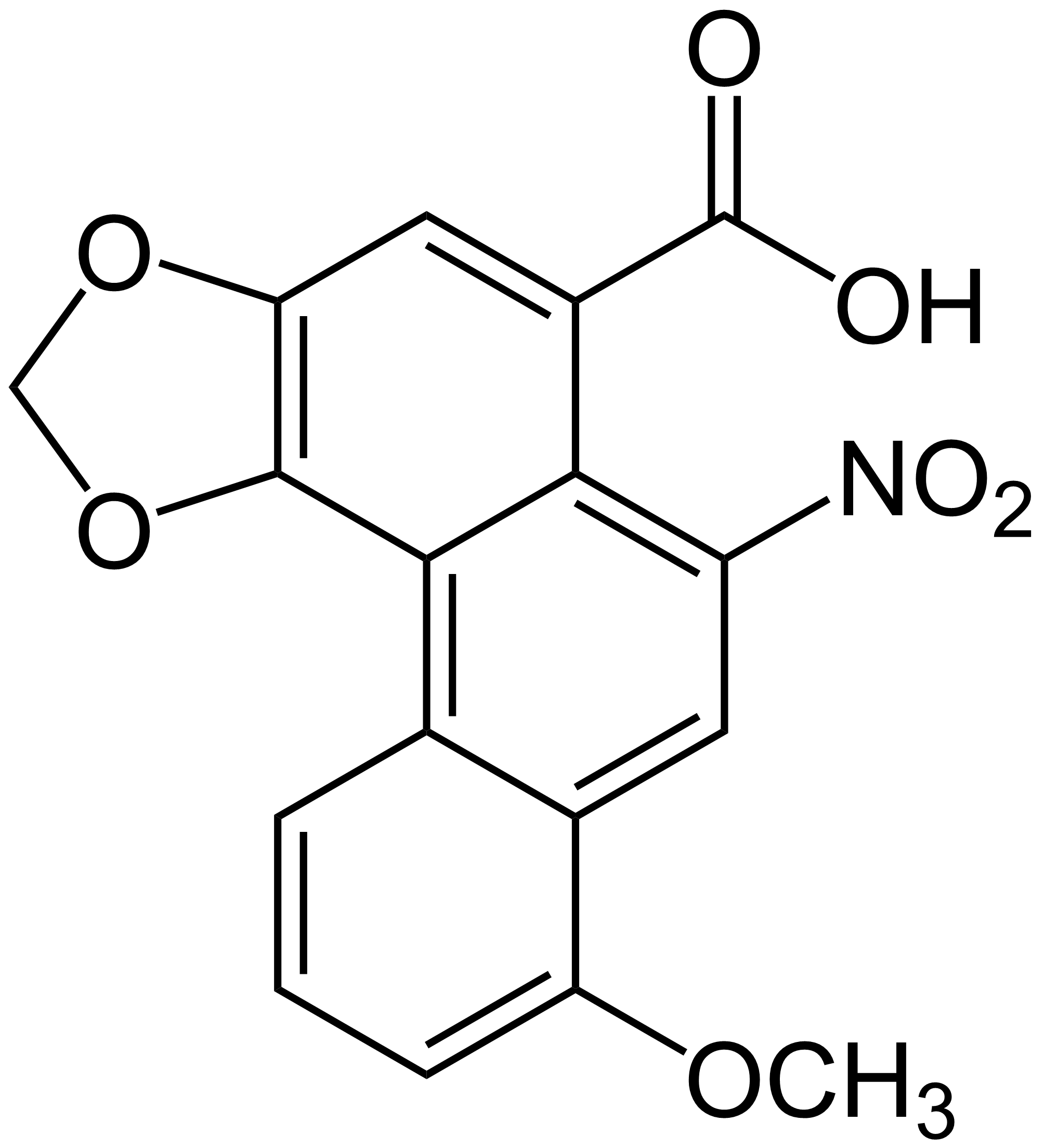
Aristolochic acid, the main toxin of Aristolochia species

== Selected species ==
The flora database Plants of the World Online accepts 554 species as of July 2025; the following is a selection of better known species:

- Aristolochia acuminata Lam.
- Aristolochia arborea
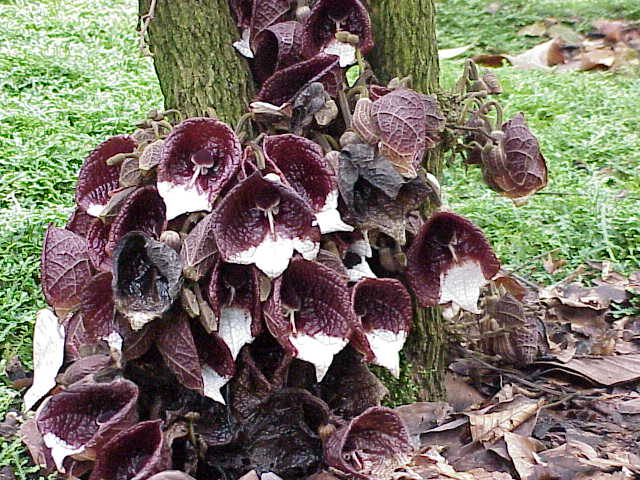
  Aristolochia arborea flowers
- Aristolochia baetica
- Aristolochia boosii
- Aristolochia bracteolata Lam. – worm killer
- Aristolochia californica Torr. – California pipevine, California Dutchman's pipe
- Aristolochia cauliflora Ule

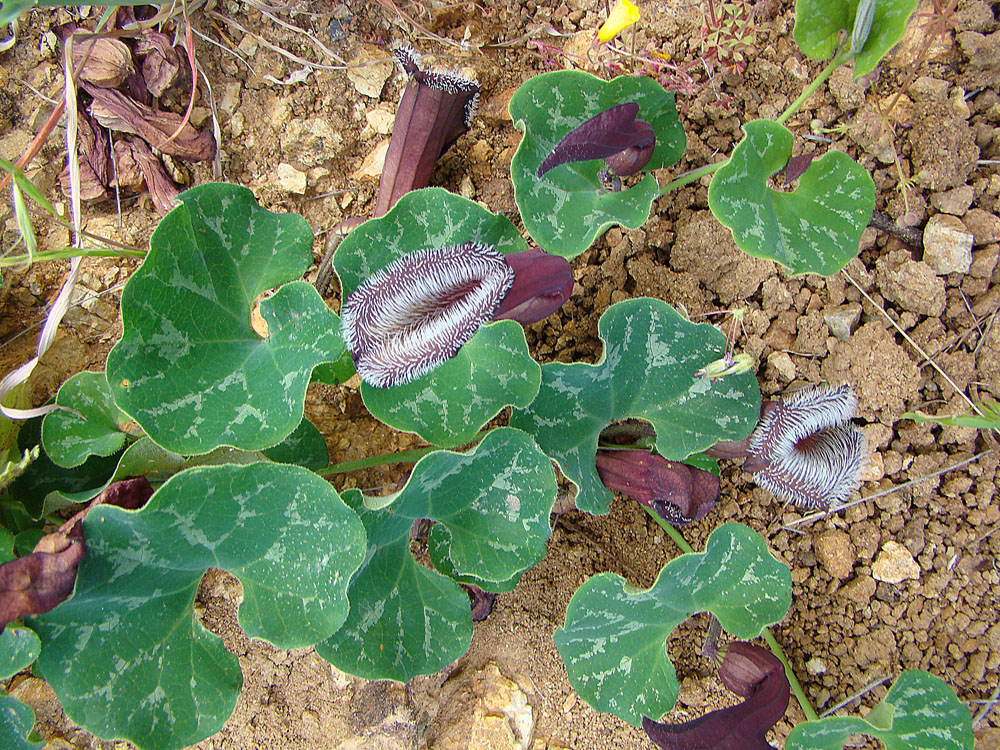
Aristolochia chilensis

- Aristolochia chilensis Bridges ex Lindl. – Chilean fox's ears
- Aristolochia clematitis L. – European birthwort
- Aristolochia contorta
- Aristolochia cucurbitifolia Hayata
- Aristolochia cucurbitoides C.F.Liang
- Aristolochia delavayi Franch.
- Aristolochia didyma – yawar panga
- Aristolochia eriantha
- Aristolochia esperanzae Kuntze
- Aristolochia fimbriata – white-veined Dutchman's pipe
- Aristolochia gibertii
- Aristolochia gigantea Mart. – giant pelican flower, Brazilian Dutchman's pipe
- Aristolochia grandiflora Sw. – pelican flower
- Aristolochia hainanensis Merr.
- Aristolochia indica L.
- Aristolochia labiata Willd. – mottled Dutchman's pipe, rooster flower
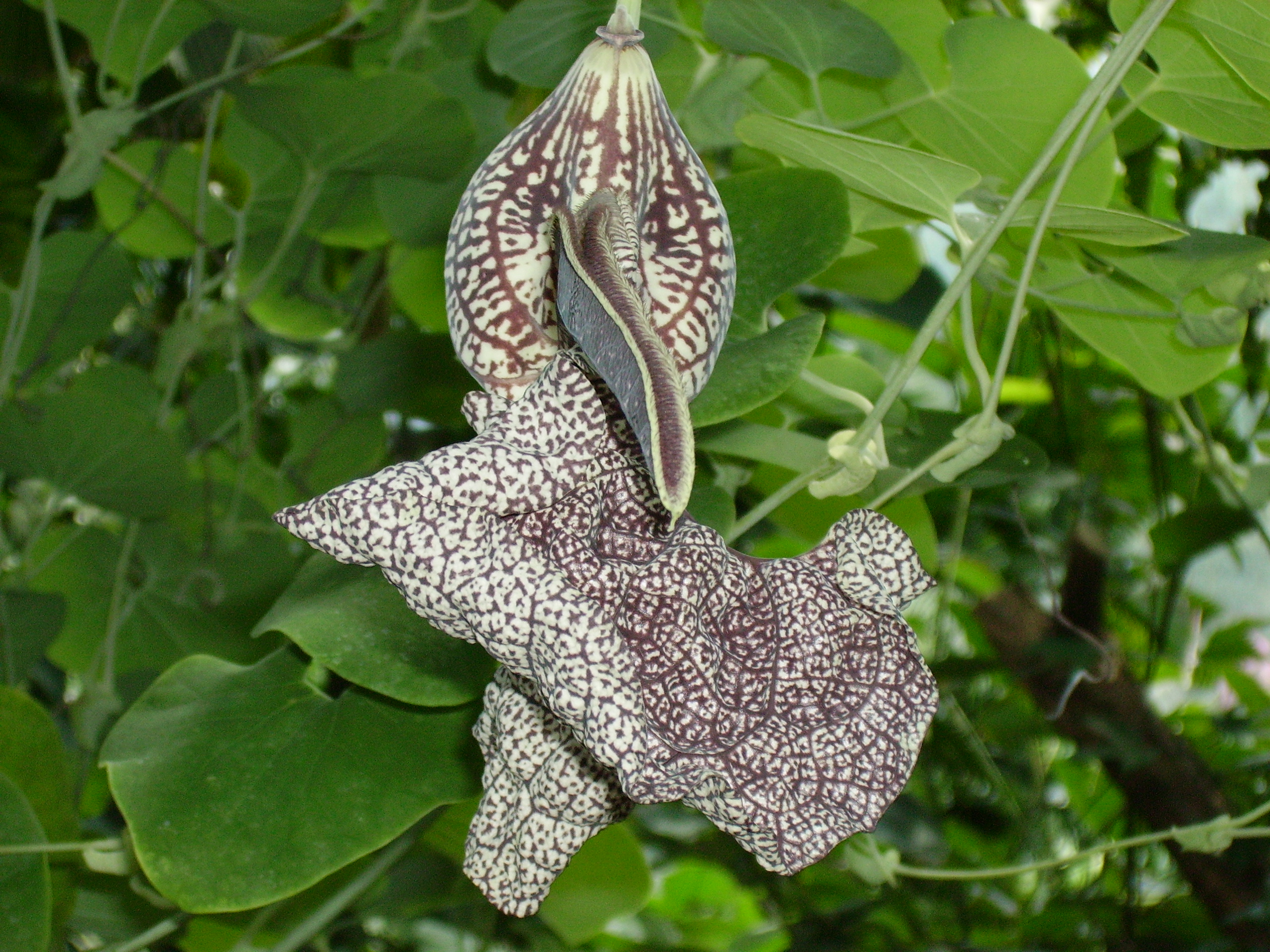
  Aristolochia labiata
- Aristolochia lindneri
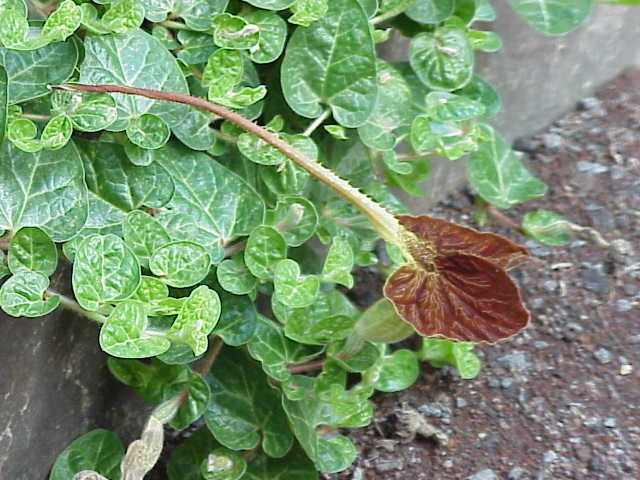
  Aristolochia lindneri
- Aristolochia littoralis D.Parodi – elegant Dutchman's pipe, calico flower
- Aristolochia longa – long aristolochia, sarrasine
- Aristolochia macrophylla Lam. – North American common Dutchman's pipe, common pipevine
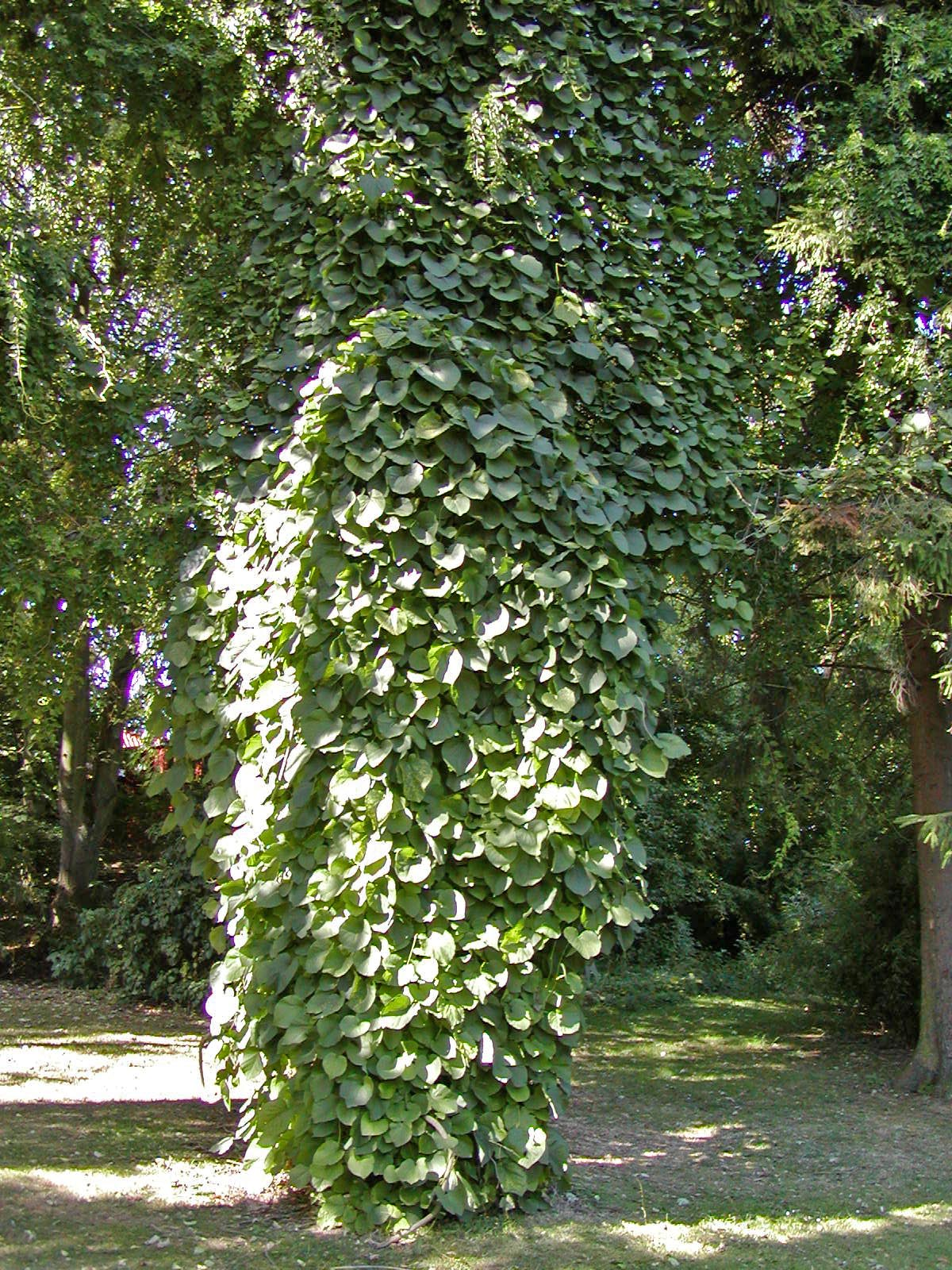
  Aristolochia macrophylla
- Aristolochia macroura
- Aristolochia nana

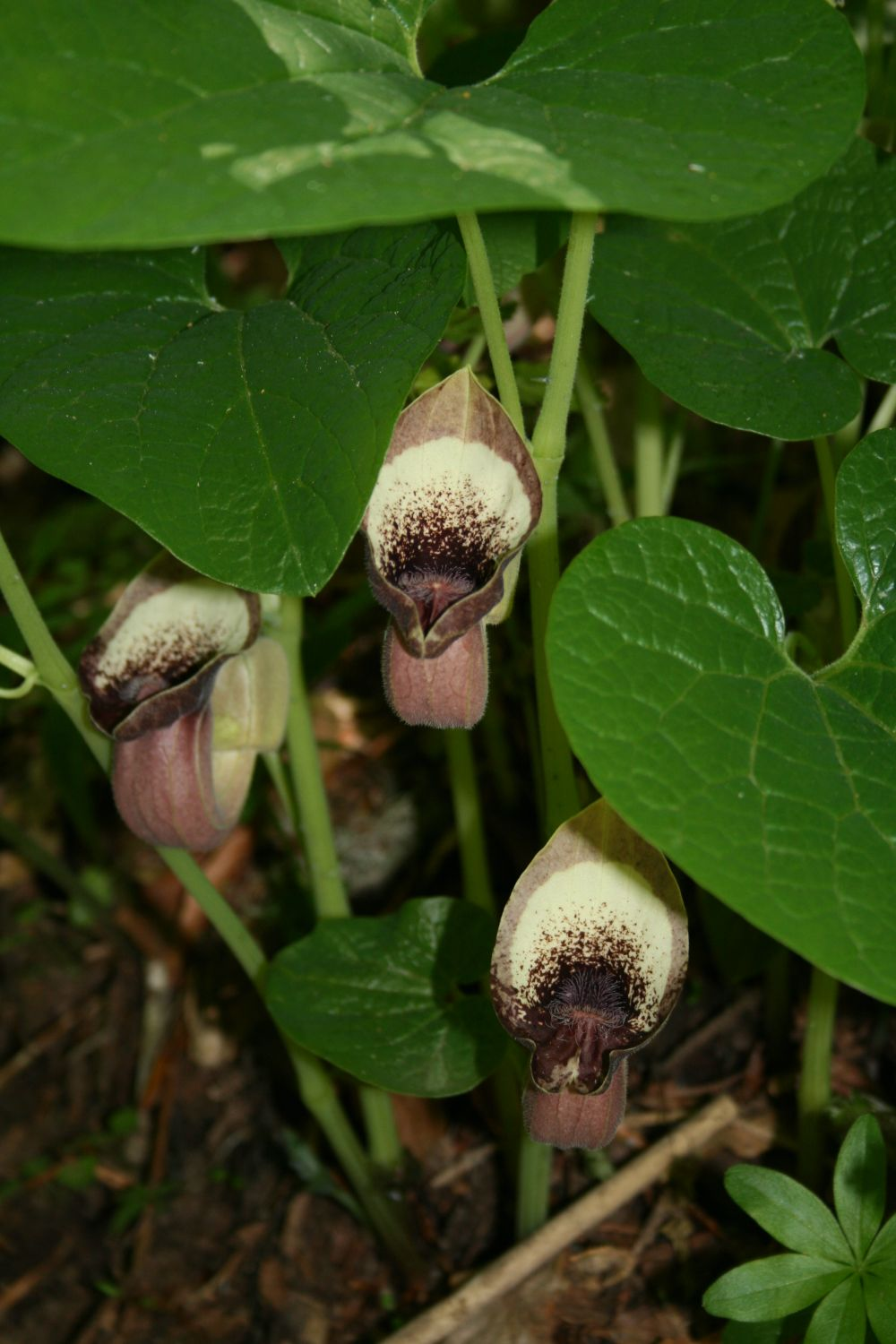
Aristolochia pontica

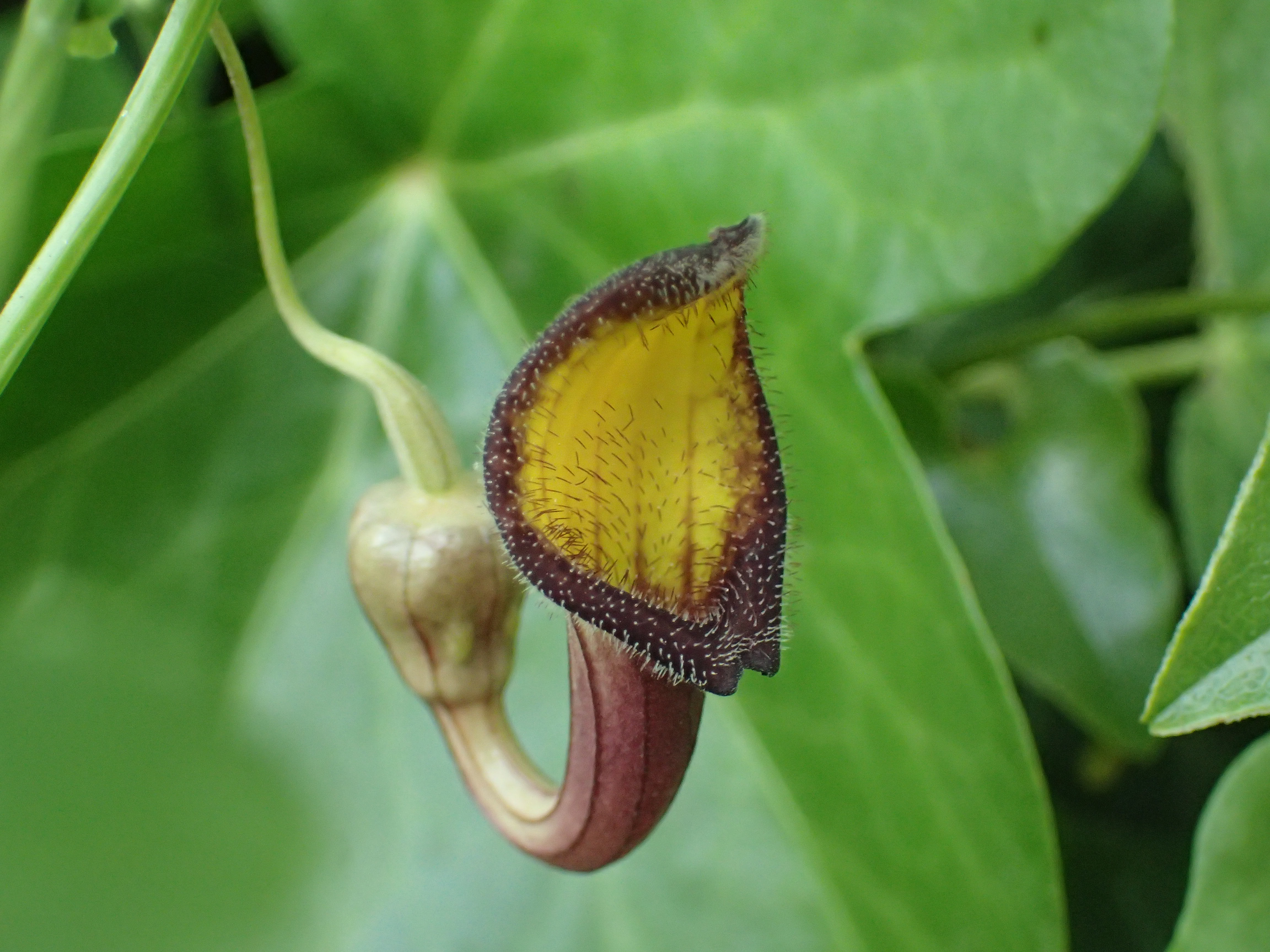
Aristolochia sempervirens

- Aristolochia maxima Jacq. – Florida Dutchman's pipe
- Aristolochia obliqua S.M.Hwang
- Aristolochia paecilantha
- Aristolochia pistolochia L.
- Aristolochia pontica
- Aristolochia quangbinhensis
- Aristolochia ringens Vahl – gaping Dutchman's pipe
- Aristolochia rotunda L. – smearwort, round birthwort; the type species of the genus
- Aristolochia scytophylla S.M.Hwang & D.L.Chen
- Aristolochia sempervirens L.
- Aristolochia serpentaria L. – Virginia snakeroot
- Aristolochia sipho L'Hér.
- Aristolochia stevensii Barringer
- Aristolochia tagala – Indian birthwort
- Aristolochia thwaitesii Hook
- Aristolochia tomentosa Sims – woolly pipevine, woolly Dutchman's pipe
- Aristolochia tricaudata
- Aristolochia trilobata
- Aristolochia tuberosa C.F.Liang & S.M.Hwang
- Aristolochia utriformis S.M.Hwang
- Aristolochia watsonii Woot. & Standl. – Watson's Dutchman's pipe
- Aristolochia westlandii Hemsl.
- Aristolochia yunnanensis Franch.
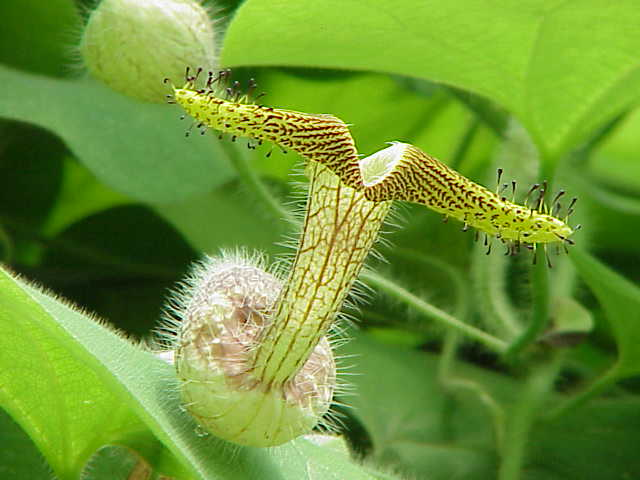
Aristolochia eriantha

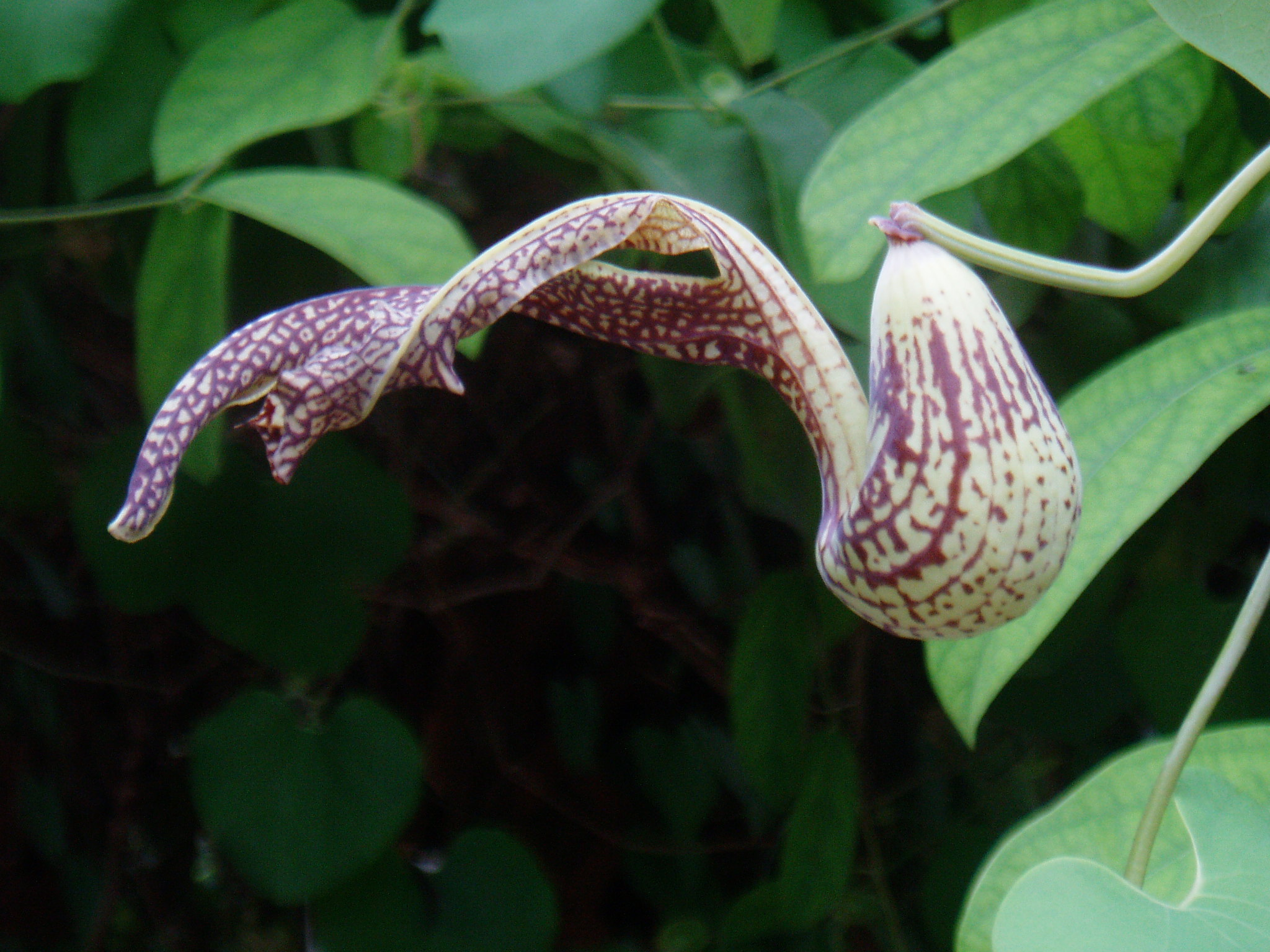
Aristolochia gibertii

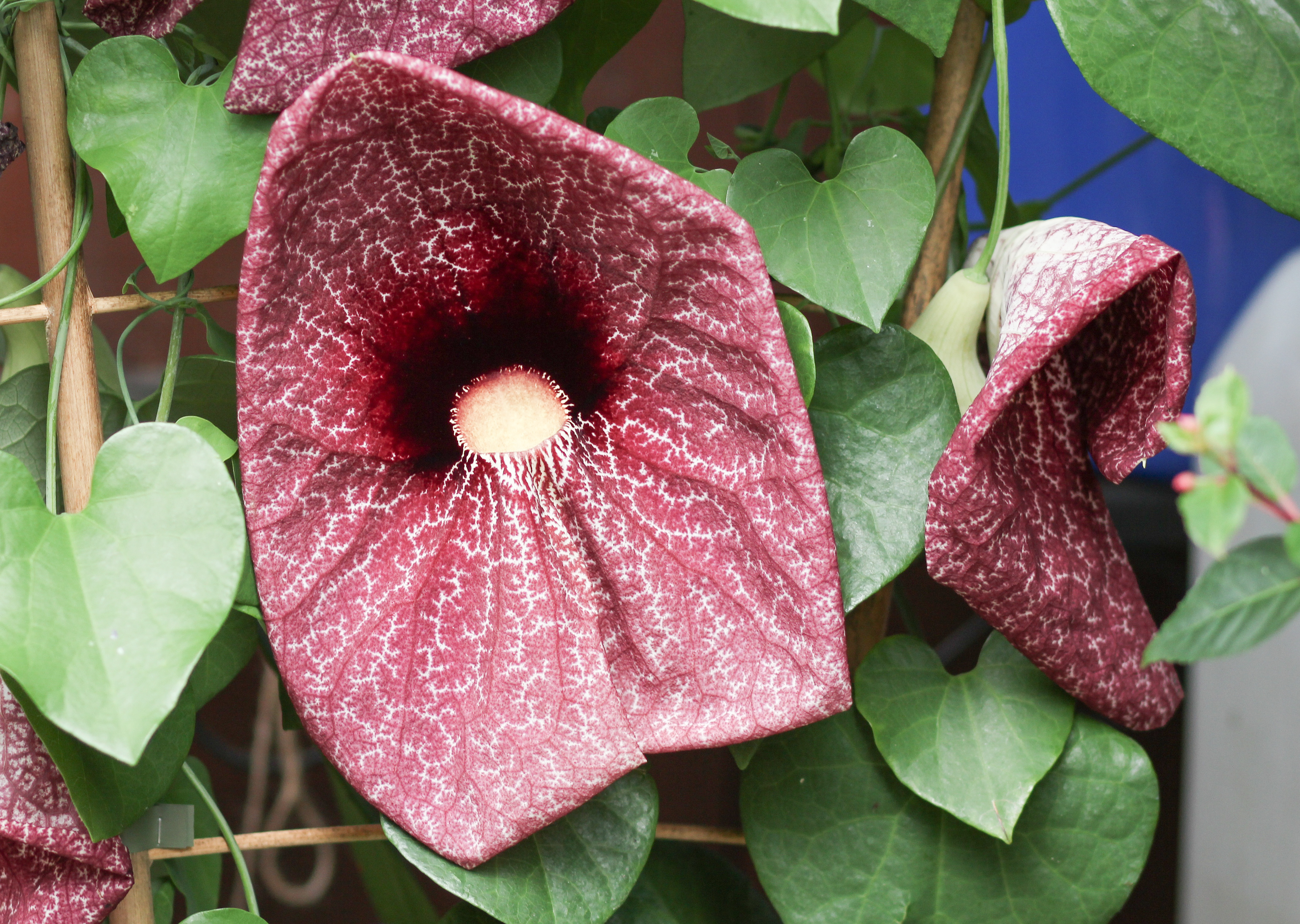
Aristolochia gigantea

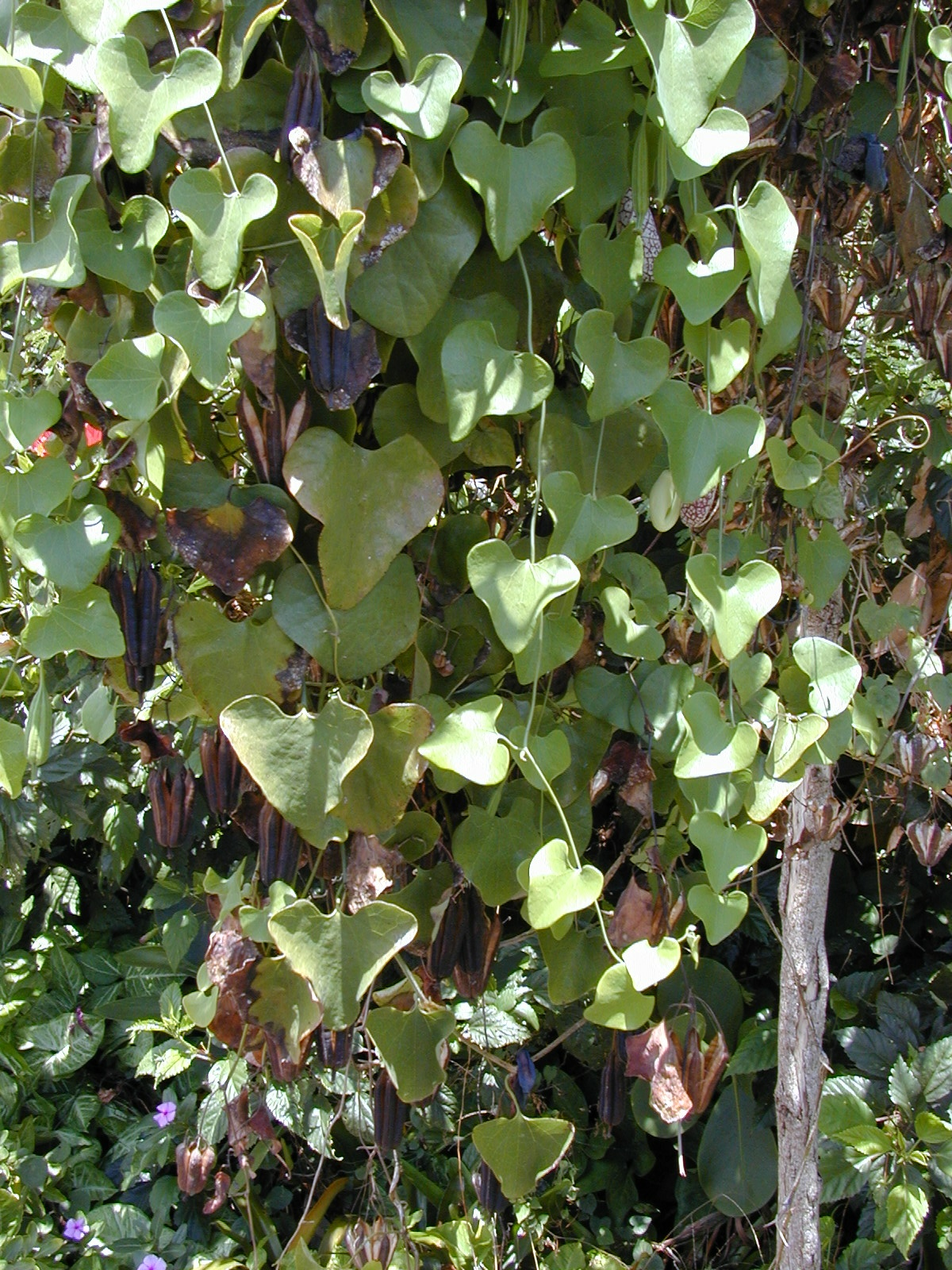
Aristolochia littoralis habit

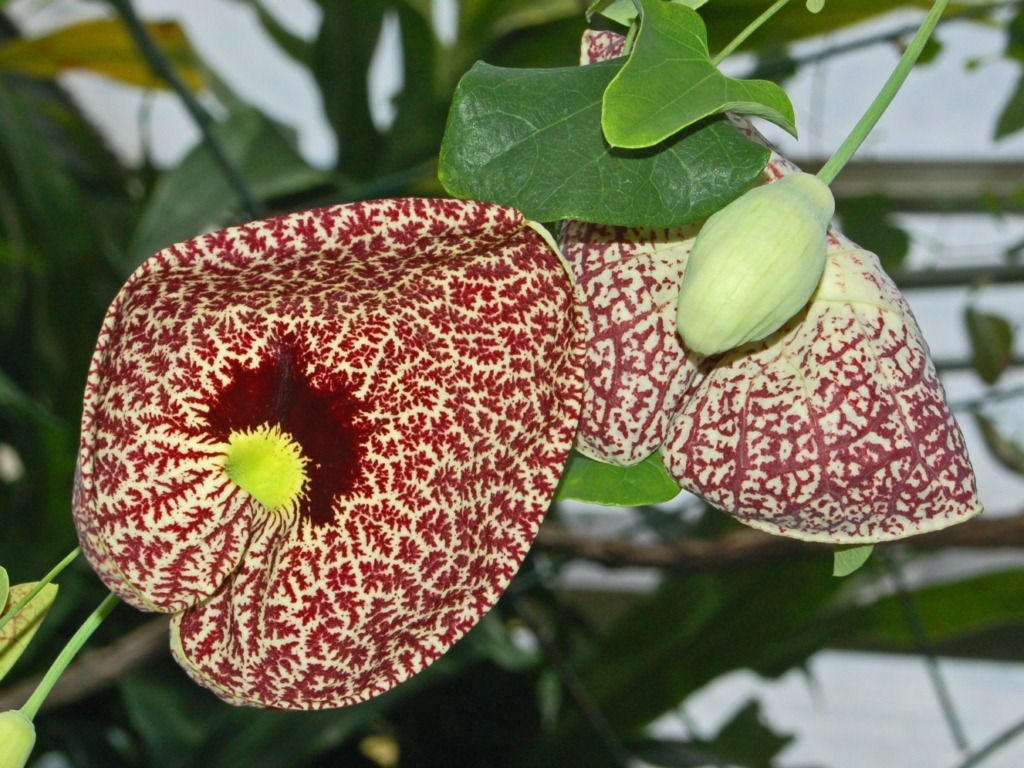
Aristolochia littoralis flower and young fruit

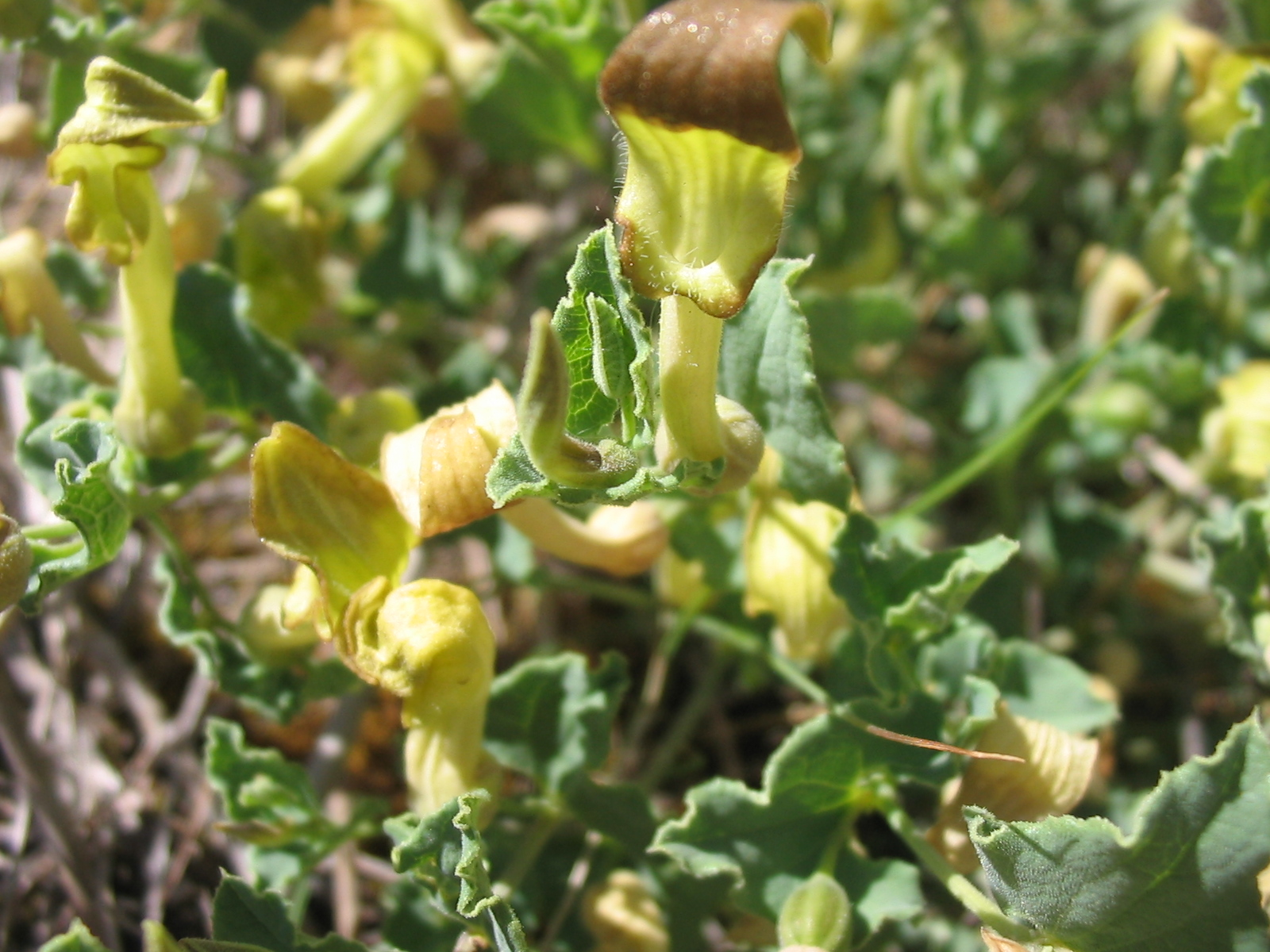
Aristolochia pistolochia

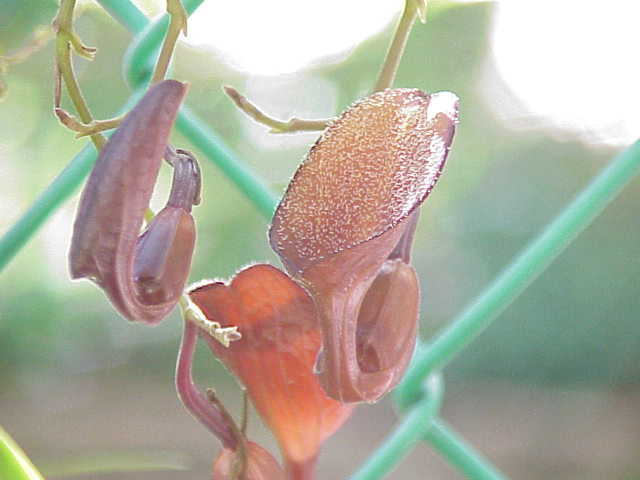
Aristolochia maxima

== Associated butterflies ==
Many species of Aristolochia are eaten by the caterpillar larvae of swallowtail and other butterflies, thus making the larvae and butterflies unpalatable to most predators. Lepidoptera feeding on Aristolochia species include:

Choreutidae

- Millieria leaf miner

Papilionidae

- False Apollo (Archon apollinus) – known from numerous pipevine species
- Bhutanitis
  - Bhutan glory (B. lidderdalii) – known from A. griffithi, A. kaempferii, A. mandshuriensis and maybe others
  - Chinese three-tailed swallowtail (B. thaidina) – known from A. moupinensis
- Troidini
  - Great windmill (Atrophaneura dasarada) – only known from A. griffithi
  - Common batwing (Atrophaneura varuna) – only known from A. kaempferi
  - Troides plateni – only known from Indian birthwort (A. tagala)
  - Cairns birdwing (Ornithoptera euphorion)
  - Richmond birdwing (O. richmondia)
  - Paradise birdwing (O. paradisea)
  - Rajah Brooke's birdwing (Trogonoptera brookiana) – only known from A. foveolata
  - Magellan birdwing (T. magellanus) – known on A. cucurbitifolia, A. ovatifolia, A. zollingeriana and maybe others
  - Pipevine swallowtail (Battus philenor) – known on A. macrophylla, Virginia snakeroot (A. serpentaria) and others
  - Polydamas Swallowtail (Battus polydamas)
  - Parides genus of swallowtails, also called cattlehearts
- Zerynthiini
  - Allancastria caucasica
  - Eastern Festoon (Allancastria cerisyi) – known from numerous pipevine species
  - Southern Festoon (Zerynthia polyxena) – known from numerous pipevine species
  - Spanish Festoon (Zerynthia rumina) – known from numerous pipevine species

In Australia the invasive Aristolochia littoralis is fatal to the caterpillars of Ornithoptera euphorion and O. richmondia and threatens to displace their proper host, A. tagala.

== Herbalism, toxicity and carcinogenicity ==
The species Aristolochia clematitis was highly regarded as a medicinal plant since the ancient Egyptians, Greeks and Romans, and on until the Early Modern era; it also plays a role in traditional Chinese medicine. Due to its resemblance to the uterus, the doctrine of signatures held that birthwort was useful in childbirth. A preparation was given to women upon delivery to expel the placenta, as noted by the herbalist Dioscurides in the 1st century AD. Despite its presence in ancient medicine, Aristolochia is known to contain the lethal toxin aristolochic acid.

The Bencao Gangmu, compiled by Li Shi-Zhen in the latter part of the sixteenth century, was based on the author's experience and on data obtained from earlier herbals; this Chinese herbal classic describes 1892 "drugs" (with 1110 drawings), including many species of Aristolochia. For 400 years, the Bencao Gangmu remained the principal source of information in traditional Chinese medicine and the work was translated into numerous languages, reflecting its influence in countries other than China. In the mid-twentieth century, the Bencao Gangmu was replaced by modern Materia Medica, the most comprehensive source being Zhong Hua Ben Cao (Encyclopedia of Chinese Materia Medica), published in 1999. The Encyclopedia lists 23 species of Aristolochia, though with little mention of toxicity. The Chinese government currently lists the following Aristolochia herbs: A. manshuriensis (stems), A. fangchi (root), A. debilis (root and fruit), and A. contorta (fruit), two of which (madouling and qingmuxiang) appear in the 2005 Pharmacopoeia of the People's Republic of China.

In traditional Chinese medicine Aristolochia species are used for certain forms of acute arthritis and edema.

Despite the toxic properties of aristolochic acid, naturopaths claim that a decoction of birthwort stimulates the production and increases the activity of white blood cells, or that pipevines contain a disinfectant which assists in wound healing. Also, Aristolochia bracteolata is colloquially known as "worm killer" due to supposed antihelminthic activity.

Aristolochia taxa have also been used as reptile repellents. A. serpentaria (Virginia snakeroot) is thus named because the root was used to treat snakebite, as "so offensive to these reptiles, that they not only avoid the places where it grows, but even flee from the traveler who carries a piece of it in his hand". A. pfeiferi, A. rugosa, and A. trilobata are also used in folk medicine to treat snakebites.

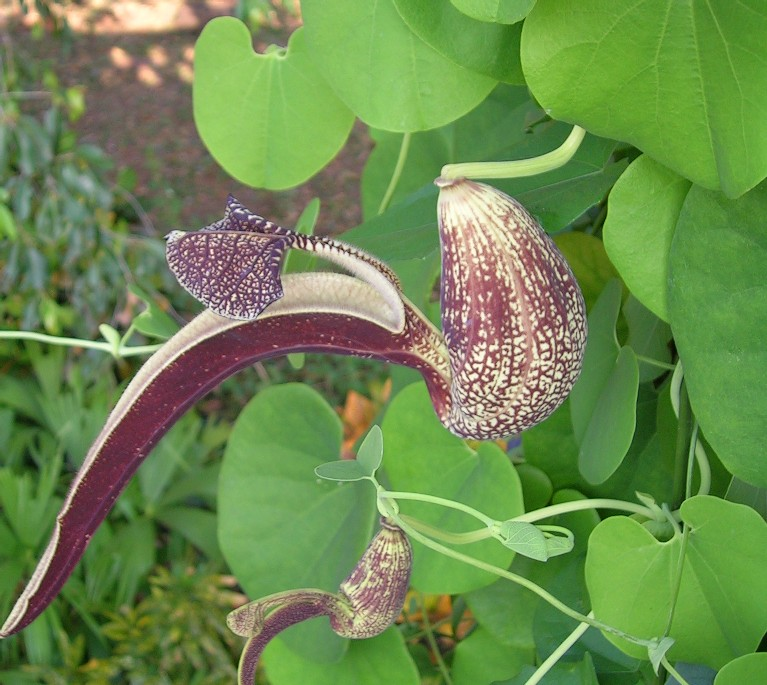
Ornamental Aristolochia ringens

=== Toxicity and carcinogenicity ===
In 1993, a series of end-stage renal disease cases was reported from Belgium associated with a weight loss treatment, where Stephania tetrandra in a herbal preparation was suspected of being replaced with Aristolochia fangchi. More than 105 patients were identified with nephropathy following the ingestion of this preparation from the same clinic from 1990 to 1992. Many required renal transplantation or dialysis. Aristolochia is a component of some Chinese herbal medicines.

Aristolochia has been shown to be both a potent carcinogen and kidney toxin. Herbal compounds containing Aristolochia are classified as a Group 1 carcinogen by the International Agency for Research on Cancer. Epidemiological and laboratory studies have identified Aristolochia to be a dangerous kidney toxin; Aristolochia has been shown to be associated with more than 100 cases of kidney failure. Furthermore, it appears as if contamination of grain with European birthwort (A. clematitis) is a cause of Balkan nephropathy, a severe renal disease occurring in parts of southeast Europe. In 2001 the UK government banned the sale, supply and importation of any medicinal product consisting of or containing a plant of the genus Aristolochia. Several other plant species that do not cause themselves kidney poisoning, but which were commonly substituted with Aristolochia in the remedies, were prohibited in the same order.

Aristolochic acid was linked to aristolochic acid-associated urothelial cancer in a Taiwanese study in 2012. In 2013, two studies reported that aristolochic acid is a strong carcinogen. Whole-genome and exome analysis of individuals with a known exposure to aristolochic acid revealed a higher rate of somatic mutation in DNA. Metabolites of aristolochic acid enter the cell nucleus and form adducts on DNA. While adducts on the transcribed DNA strand within genes are detected and removed by transcription-coupled repair, the adducts on the non-transcribed strand remain and eventually cause DNA replication errors. These adducts have a preference for adenine bases, and cause A-to-T transversions. Furthermore, these metabolites appear to show a preference for CAG and TAG sequences.

== Garden history ==
Due to their spectacular flowers, several species are used as ornamental plants, notably the hardy A. macrophyllum of eastern North America, which was one of John Bartram's many introductions to British gardens; in 1761 Bartram sent seeds he had collected in the Ohio River Valley to Peter Collinson in London, and Collinson gave them to the nurseryman James Gordon at Mile End to raise. The vine was soon adopted for creating for arbors "a canopy impenetrable to the rays of the sun, or moderate rain", as Dr John Sims noted in The Botanical Magazine, 1801.

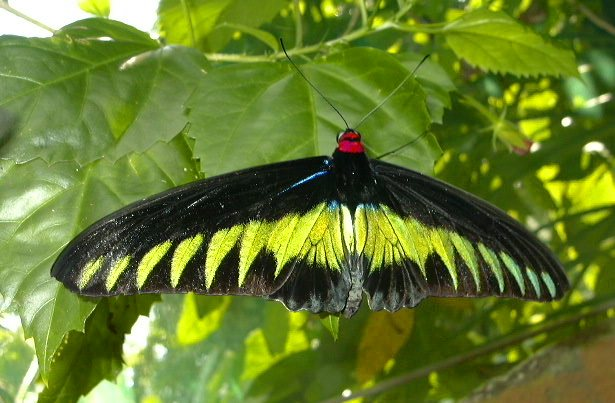
Rajah Brooke's birdwing, of which the caterpillars feed on Aristolochia foveolata

== See also ==
- Nepenthes aristolochioides, a carnivorous plant with pitchers resembling Aristolochia flowers
- Opodeldoc
