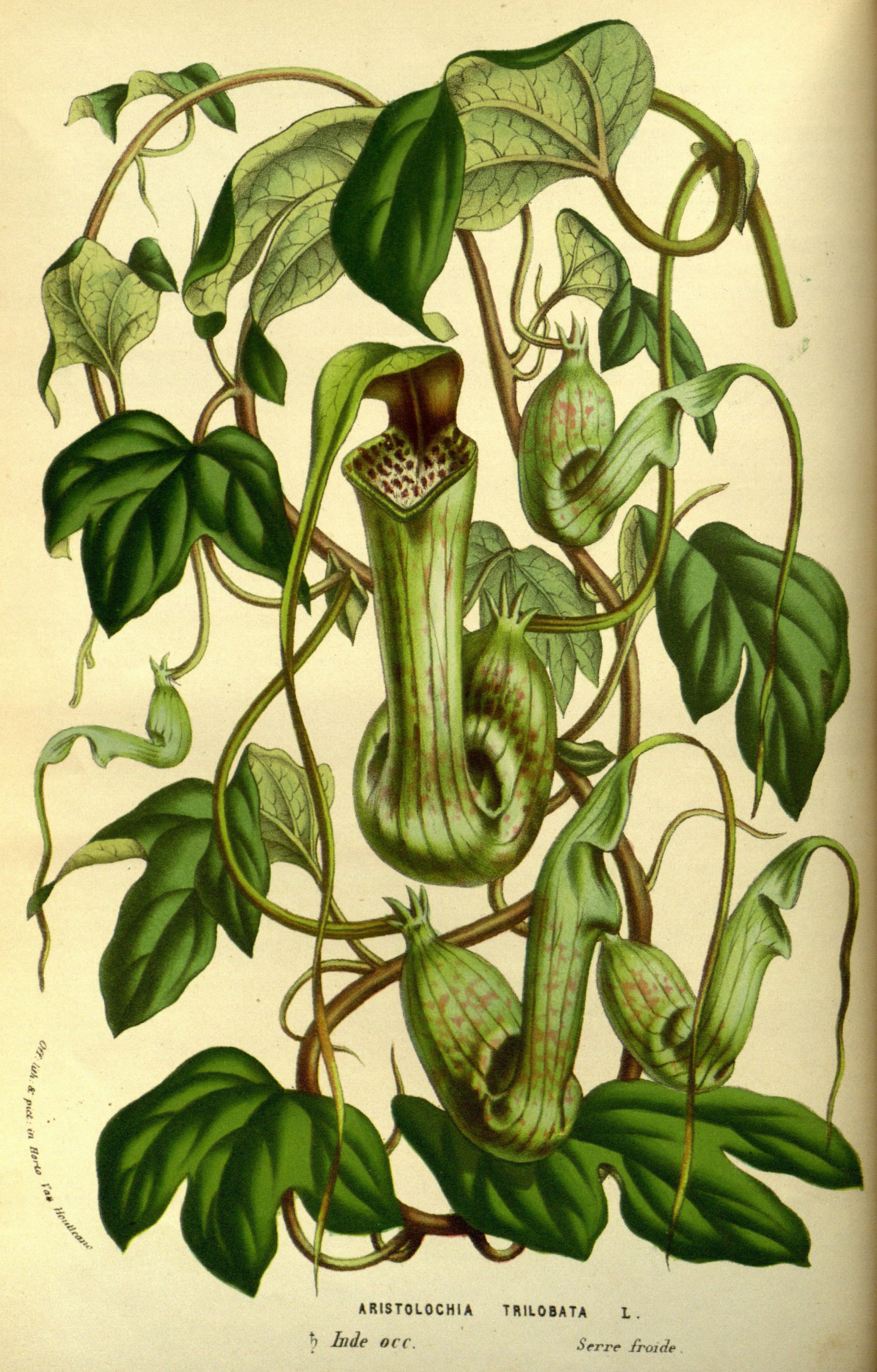

Conservation status
- Least Concern (IUCN 2.3)

Scientific classification
- Kingdom: Plantae
- Clade: Tracheophytes
- Clade: Angiosperms
- Clade: Magnoliids
- Order: Piperales
- Family: Aristolochiaceae
- Genus: Aristolochia
- Species: A. trilobata

Binomial name
- Aristolochia trilobata L.

= Aristolochia trilobata =

Species of flowering plant

Aristolochia trilobata, commonly known as contribo or Bejuco de Santiago, is a perennial herb in the Dutchman's pipe family Aristolochiaceae. A.trilobata is endemic to the Caribbean and is found in both Central America and South America.

== Description ==
Aristolochia trilobata is a climbing vine species that typically reaches a length of up to three meters. The leaves are characterized by dark green coloration and have three lobes. The bark is coarse, readily sheds, and emits a distinctive, potent odor.

In traditional folk medicine, the whole plant is used to create a tea or an extract. It is recommended to consume the tea in moderation (once a week) to prevent other health complications. Teas and extracts are known to increase immune health, increase appetite/energy, and fight fatigue. It has been commonly used to treat conditions such as flu, gastritis, parasites, fevers, constipation, stomach ache, and indigestion.

== Habitat ==
Aristolochia trilobata is a tropical plant native to the Caribbean. Its populations extend from Mexico to Brazil and grows best in a wet, tropical climate.

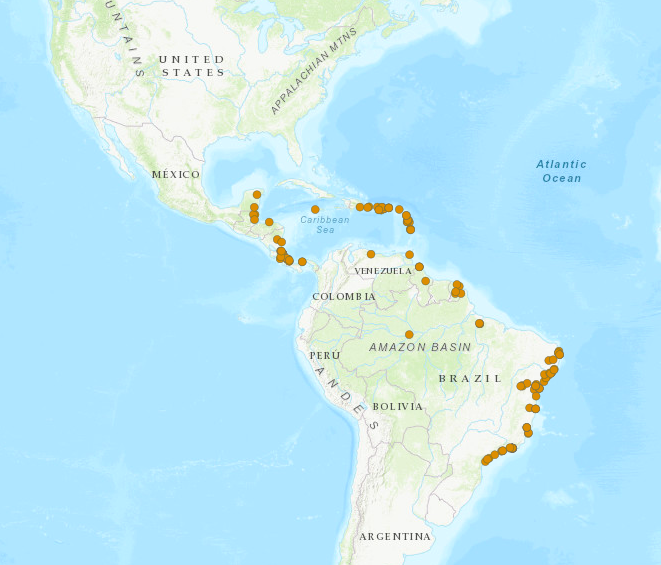
Geographic range of Aristolochia trilobata throughout the Caribbean (IUCN)

== Conservation ==
Some herbalists in Belize claim that it is harder to find an abundance of A. trilobata due to habitat destruction.

However, the International Union for Conservation of Nature (IUCN) most recently (December 2020) assessed the status of A. trilobata as "Least Concern (LC)".
