= Aristolochia nana =

Scientific classification
- Kingdom: Plantae
- Clade: Tracheophytes
- Clade: Angiosperms
- Clade: Magnoliids
- Order: Piperales
- Family: Aristolochiaceae
- Genus: Aristolochia
- Species: A. nana

Binomial name
- Aristolochia nana S.Watson

Species of flowering plant

Aristolochia nana is a prostrate plant native to the states of San Luis Potosí and Hidalgo in Mexico in the family Aristolochiaceae. It is the smallest species in the genus. Some plants found around San Luis Potosi have flowers only 0.5 cm long by 1.5 mm wide.
