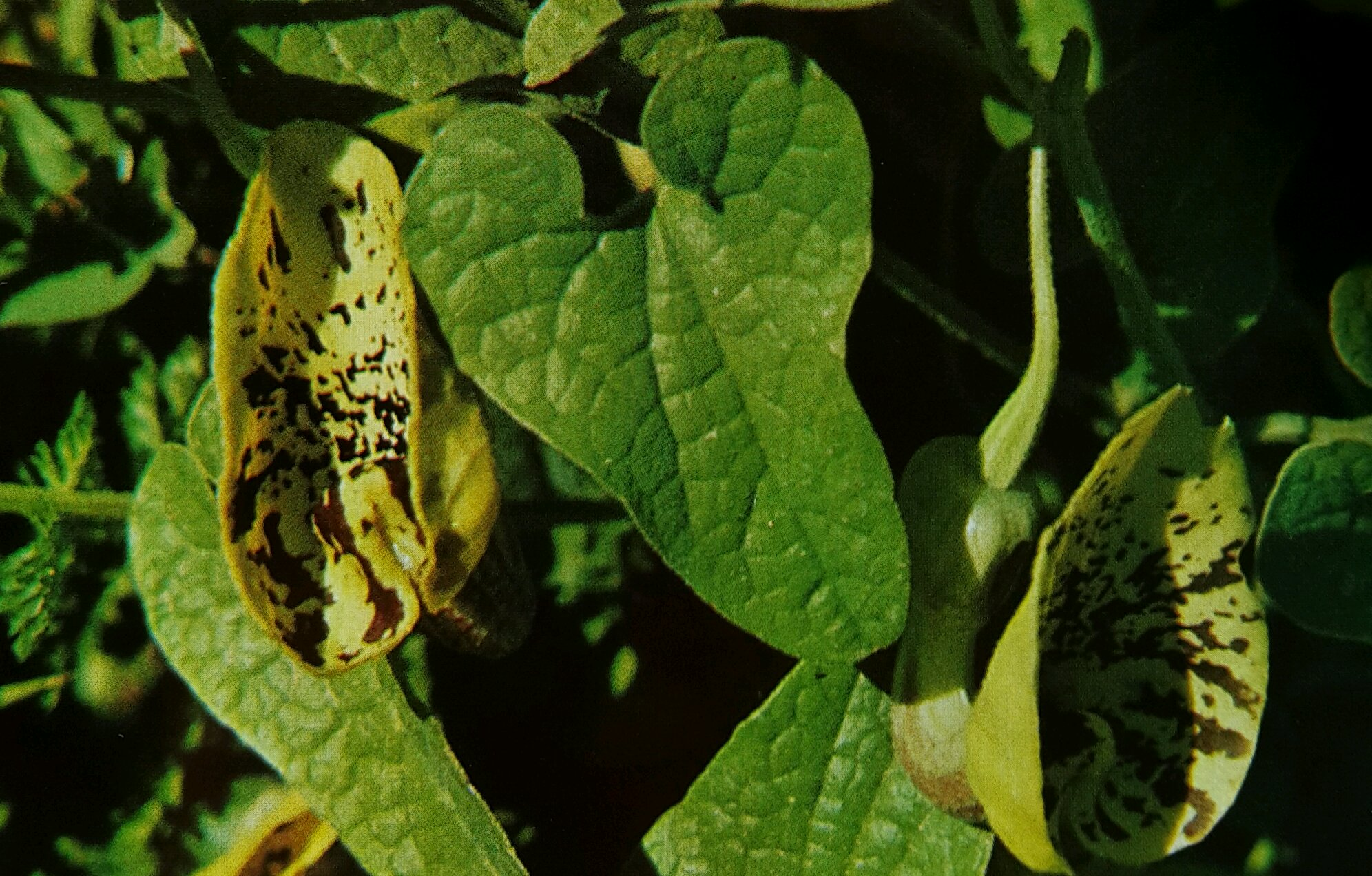

Scientific classification
- Kingdom: Plantae
- Clade: Embryophytes
- Clade: Tracheophytes
- Clade: Spermatophytes
- Clade: Angiosperms
- Clade: Magnoliids
- Order: Piperales
- Family: Aristolochiaceae
- Genus: Aristolochia
- Species: A. paecilantha

Binomial name
- Aristolochia paecilantha Boiss.

Synonyms
- Aristolochia scabridula Boiss.

= Aristolochia paecilantha =

Species of plant in the family Aristolochiaceae

Aristolochia delavayi, known as the party-colored birthwort, is a species of flowering plant in the family Aristolochiaceae.

== Description ==
Perennial. Stems striate, prostrate or ascending. Leaves petiolate, broadly cordate at base; limb triangular. Flowers reaching up to 10 cm long; peduncle bending towards the two-thirds. Ovary striate. pubescent. Tube recurved. Strip very dilated, with two cordate and very developed auricles. Outer. part greenish or reddish, puberulent. Inner part glabrous; background brightmyellow overcharged with blackish purple spots.

== Flowering ==
The plant flowers in April–May.

== Habitat ==
More or less rocky places, rather shady.

== Distribution ==
Lower and middle mountains, Hermon.

== Geographic area ==
It is endemic to Syria, Lebanon and Palestine.

The spots on the bright yellow background of the large flowers of this birthwort are at the origin of its specific name which comes from the Greek poikilos, spotted, and anthos, flower.
