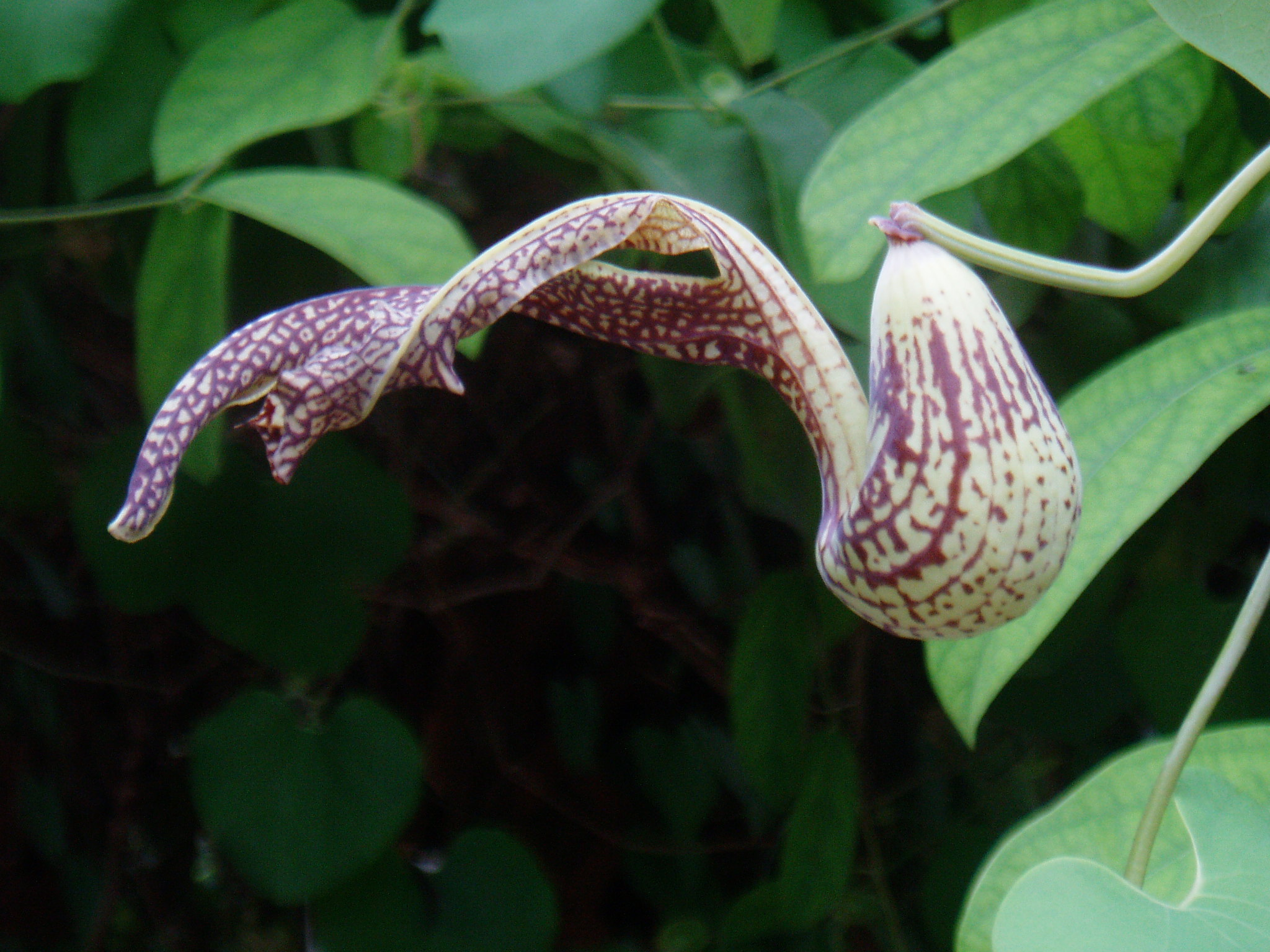

Scientific classification
- Kingdom: Plantae
- Clade: Tracheophytes
- Clade: Angiosperms
- Clade: Magnoliids
- Order: Piperales
- Family: Aristolochiaceae
- Genus: Aristolochia
- Species: A. gibertii

Binomial name
- Aristolochia gibertii Hook. 1862

= Aristolochia gibertii =

Species of plant

Aristolochia gibertii is a species of perennial plant in the family Aristolochiaceae. It is found in Argentina, Bolivia, and Paraguay.
