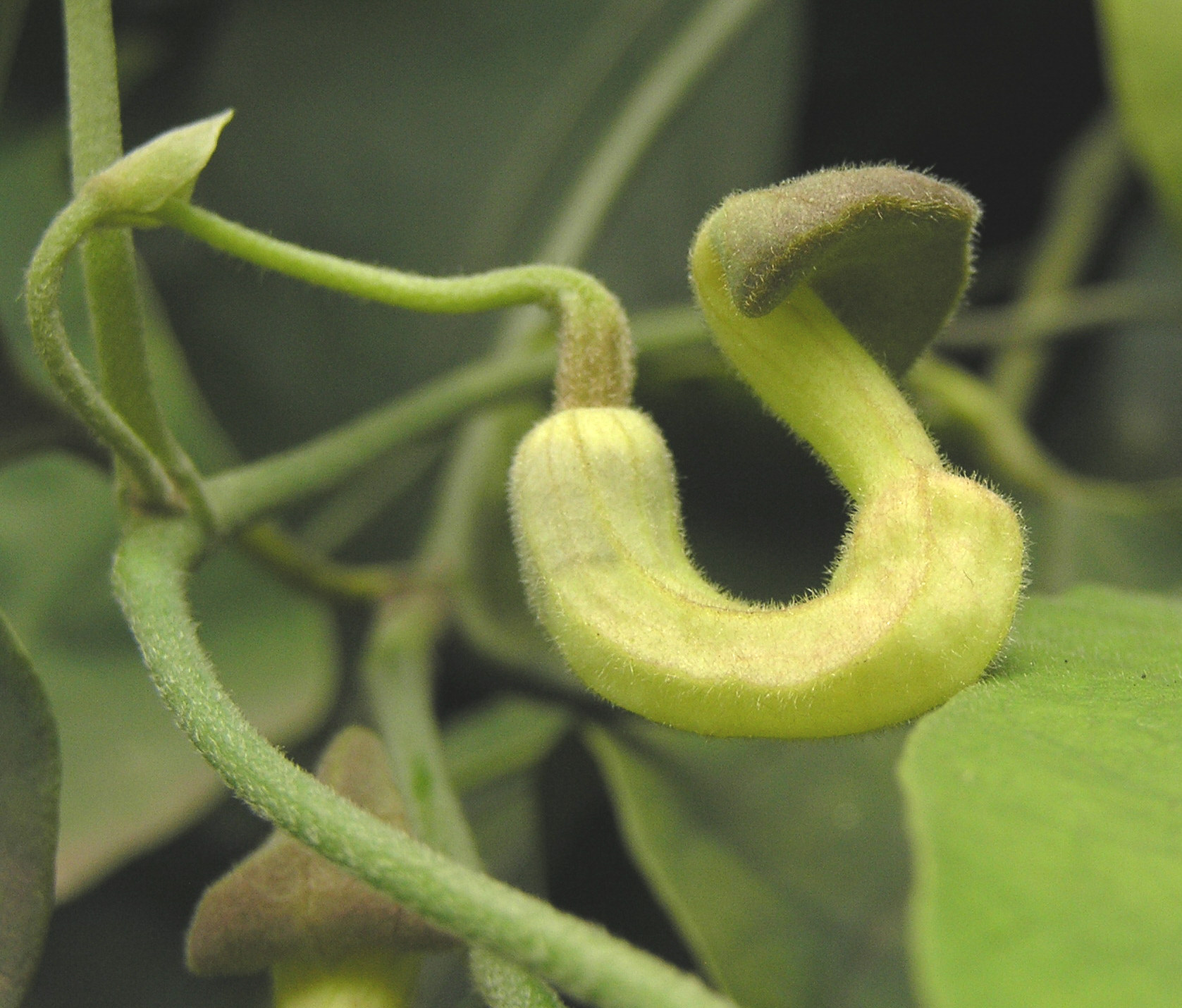
- Aristolochia cucurbitifolia in the Taipei Botanical Garden

Conservation status
- Vulnerable (IUCN 3.1)

Scientific classification
- Kingdom: Plantae
- Clade: Tracheophytes
- Clade: Angiosperms
- Clade: Magnoliids
- Order: Piperales
- Family: Aristolochiaceae
- Genus: Aristolochia
- Species: A. cucurbitifolia

Binomial name
- Aristolochia cucurbitifolia Hayata

= Aristolochia cucurbitifolia =

Species of vine

Aristolochia cucurbitifolia is a species of plant in the family Aristolochiaceae. It is endemic to Taiwan.
