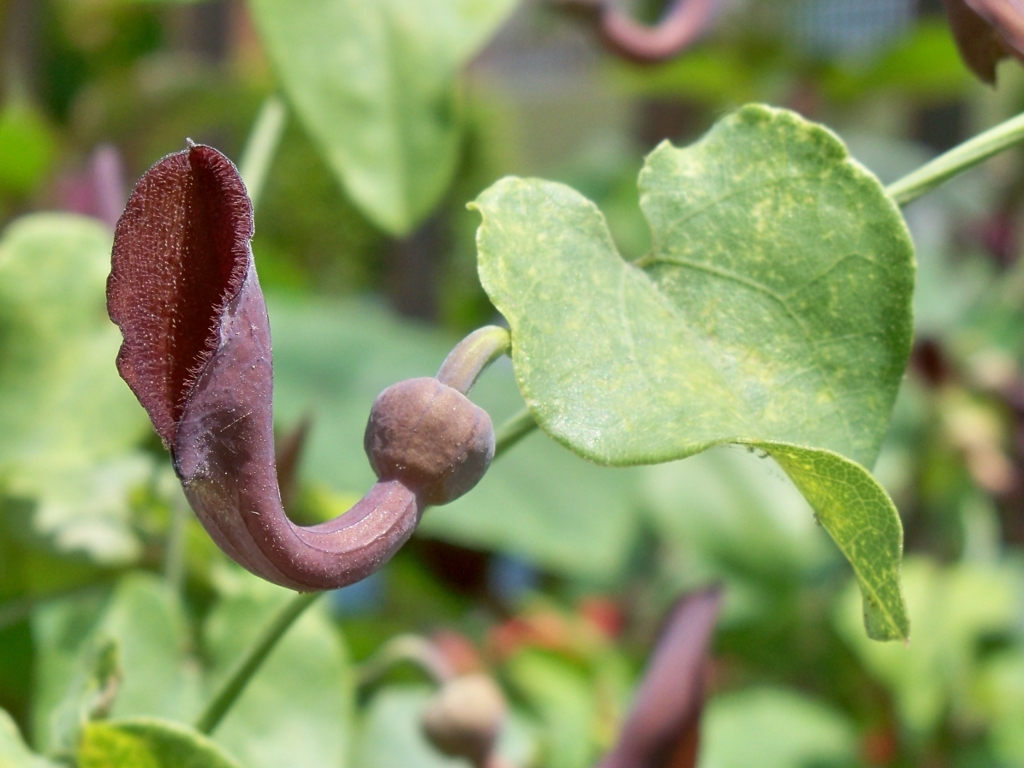

Scientific classification
- Kingdom: Plantae
- Clade: Tracheophytes
- Clade: Angiosperms
- Clade: Magnoliids
- Order: Piperales
- Family: Aristolochiaceae
- Genus: Aristolochia
- Species: A. baetica

Binomial name
- Aristolochia baetica L.

= Aristolochia baetica =

Species of vine

Aristolochia baetica, the Andalusian Dutchman's pipe or pipe vine, is a poisonous perennial vine that occurs in North Africa and the southern Iberian Peninsula, from Algeria to Portugal.

== Description ==
Aristolochia baetica is a rarely procumbent evergreen climber with triangular, cordate, glaucous lobes a quarter the size of the leaves. Flowers vary from 2 to 5 centimetres and are from brownish-purple to reddish.
