= Aristolochia cucurbitoides =

Conservation status
- Vulnerable (IUCN 3.1)

Scientific classification
- Kingdom: Plantae
- Clade: Tracheophytes
- Clade: Angiosperms
- Clade: Magnoliids
- Order: Piperales
- Family: Aristolochiaceae
- Genus: Aristolochia
- Species: A. cucurbitoides

Binomial name
- Aristolochia cucurbitoides C.F.Liang

Species of plant

Aristolochia cucurbitoides is a species of plant in the family Aristolochiaceae. It is endemic to China.
