= List of Aristolochia species =

The following species in the flowering plant genus Aristolochia, the birthworts, pipevines, or Dutchman's pipes, are accepted by Plants of the World Online. Attempts to untangle taxonomic relationships within this taxon have met with difficulties.

== List ==
- Aristolochia acontophylla Pfeifer
- Aristolochia acuminata Lam.
- Aristolochia acutifolia Duch.
- Aristolochia adalica Tosunoğlu & Malyer
- Aristolochia adiastola G.A.Romero & Elad.Fernández
- Aristolochia albertiana Ahumada
- Aristolochia albida Duch.
- Aristolochia albopilosa M.González, S.González & Barrie
- Aristolochia alexandriana (Mich.J.Parsons) Buchwalder & Wanke
- Aristolochia altanii İlçim & Behçet
- Aristolochia amara (Aubl.) Poncy
- Aristolochia andina F.González & I.G.Vargas
- Aristolochia anguicida Jacq.
- Aristolochia angustifolia Cham.
- Aristolochia annamensis T.V.Do, Wanke & Neinhuis
- Aristolochia apoloensis Rusby
- Aristolochia arborea Linden
- Aristolochia arborescens L.
- Aristolochia arcuata Mast.
- Aristolochia arenicola Hance
- Aristolochia argentina Griseb.
- Aristolochia asclepiadifolia Brandegee
- Aristolochia asperifolia Ule ex Pilg.
- Aristolochia assamica D.Borah & T.V.Do
- Aristolochia assisii J.Freitas, Lírio & F.González
- Aristolochia atropurpurea C.S.P.Parish ex Hook.f.
- Aristolochia auricularia Boiss.
- Aristolochia australopithecurus (Mich.J.Parsons) Buchwalder & Wanke
- Aristolochia austrochinensis C.Y.Cheng & J.S.Ma
- Aristolochia austroszechuanica C.P.Tsien & C.Y.Cheng ex C.Y.Cheng & J.L.Wu
- Aristolochia austroyunnanensis S.M.Hwang
- Aristolochia baenzigeri B.Hansen & Phuph.
- Aristolochia baetica L.
- Aristolochia bahiensis F.González
- Aristolochia balansae Franch.
- Aristolochia bambusifolia C.F.Liang ex H.Q.Wen
- Aristolochia baracoensis R.Rankin
- Aristolochia barbourii Barringer
- Aristolochia baseri Malyer & Erken
- Aristolochia batucensis Wiggins & Rollins
- Aristolochia biakensis (Mich.J.Parsons) Buchwalder & Wanke
- Aristolochia bianorii Sennen & Pau
- Aristolochia bicolor Ule ex Pilg.
- Aristolochia bidoupensis T.V.Do
- Aristolochia bilabiata L.
- Aristolochia billardieri Jaub. & Spach
- Aristolochia bilobata L.
- Aristolochia binhthuanensis T.V.Do
- Aristolochia birostris Duch.
- Aristolochia bodamae Dingler
- Aristolochia boliviensis Kuntze
- Aristolochia bonettiana Elad.Fernández & G.A.Romero
- Aristolochia boosii Panter
- Aristolochia bottae Jaub. & Spach
- Aristolochia bracteolata Lam.
- Aristolochia bracteosa Duch.
- Aristolochia brevifolia (Cham.) Hauman
- Aristolochia brevilabris Bornm.
- Aristolochia brevipes Benth.
- Aristolochia bridgesii (Klotzsch) Duch.
- Aristolochia buchtienii O.C.Schmidt
- Aristolochia bukuti Poncy
- Aristolochia bullata Pfeifer
- Aristolochia buntingii Pfeifer
- Aristolochia burchellii Mast.
- Aristolochia burelae Herzog
- Aristolochia burkartii Ahumada
- Aristolochia cabrerae Ahumada
- Aristolochia californica Torr.
- Aristolochia cambodiana Pierre ex Lecomte
- Aristolochia cardiantha Pfeifer
- Aristolochia carterae Pfeifer
- Aristolochia castellanosii Ahumada
- Aristolochia cathcartii Hook.f.
- Aristolochia caudata Jacq.
- Aristolochia caulialata C.Y.Wu ex C.Y.Cheng & J.S.Ma
- Aristolochia cauliflora Ule
- Aristolochia ceresensis Kuntze
- Aristolochia ceropegioides S.Moore
- Aristolochia chachapoyensis Ahumada
- Aristolochia chalmersii O.C.Schmidt
- Aristolochia chamissonis (Klotzsch) Duch.
- Aristolochia championii Merr. & Chun
- Aristolochia chilensis Bridges ex Lindl.
- Aristolochia chiquitensis Duch.
- Aristolochia chlamydophylla C.Y.Wu
- Aristolochia chrismuelleriana W.N.Takeuchi
- Aristolochia chrysochlora Barb.Rodr.
- Aristolochia cilicica P.H.Davis & M.S.Khan
- Aristolochia clavidenia C.Wright ex Griseb.
- Aristolochia clematitis L.
- Aristolochia clementis Alain
- Aristolochia clusii Lojac.
- Aristolochia coadunata Backer
- Aristolochia cochinchinensis T.V.Do
- Aristolochia colimensis Santana Mich.
- Aristolochia colombiana F.González
- Aristolochia colossifolia Hoehne
- Aristolochia compressicaulis Z.L.Yang
- Aristolochia consimilis Mast.
- Aristolochia constricta Griseb.
- Aristolochia contorta Bunge
- Aristolochia conversiae Pfeifer
- Aristolochia cordiflora Mutis ex Kunth
- Aristolochia cordigera (Klotzsch) Duch.
- Aristolochia cornuta Mast.
- Aristolochia cortinata Reinecke
- Aristolochia coryi I.M.Johnst.
- Aristolochia crassinervia O.C.Schmidt
- Aristolochia cremersii Poncy
- Aristolochia cretica Lam.
- Aristolochia cucurbitifolia Hayata
- Aristolochia cucurbitoides C.F.Liang
- Aristolochia curtisii King
- Aristolochia curviflora Malme
- Aristolochia cymbifera Mart.
- Aristolochia cynanchifolia Mart.
- Aristolochia dabieshanensis C.Y.Cheng & W.Yu
- Aristolochia daemoninoxia Mast.
- Aristolochia dalyi F.González
- Aristolochia davilae Calzada, J.G.Flores & O.Téllez
- Aristolochia debilis Siebold & Zucc.
- Aristolochia decandra Ding Hou
- Aristolochia delavayi Franch.
- Aristolochia deltantha F.Muell.
- Aristolochia deltoidea Kunth
- Aristolochia dictyophlebia Merr. & L.M.Perry
- Aristolochia didyma S.Moore
- Aristolochia dielsiana O.C.Schmidt
- Aristolochia dilatata N.E.Br.
- Aristolochia dinghoui Favio González & O.Poncy
- Aristolochia disticha Mast.
- Aristolochia × domingensis Ekman & O.C.Schmidt
- Aristolochia durangensis Pfeifer
- Aristolochia echinata Barb.Rodr.
- Aristolochia ehrenbergiana Cham.
- Aristolochia ekmanii O.C.Schmidt
- Aristolochia embergeri Nozeran & N.Hall
- Aristolochia emiliae Santana Mich. & Solís
- Aristolochia engleriana O.C.Schmidt
- Aristolochia erecta L.
- Aristolochia eriantha Mart.
- Aristolochia esperanzae Kuntze
- Aristolochia fangchi Y.C.Wu ex L.D.Chow & S.M.Hwang
- Aristolochia faucimaculata H.Zhang & C.K.Hsien
- Aristolochia faviogonzalezii T.V.Do, Wanke & Neinhuis
- Aristolochia feddei H.Lév.
- Aristolochia filipendulina Duch.
- Aristolochia fimbriata Cham.
- Aristolochia flava Poncy
- Aristolochia flexuosa Duch.
- Aristolochia floribunda Lem.
- Aristolochia foetida Kunth
- Aristolochia fontanesii Boiss. & Reut.
- Aristolochia fordiana Hemsl.
- Aristolochia forrestiana J.S.Ma
- Aristolochia fosteri Barringer
- Aristolochia foveolata Merr.
- Aristolochia fragrantissima Ruiz
- Aristolochia fujianensis S.M.Hwang
- Aristolochia fulvicoma Merr. & Chun
- Aristolochia gabonensis Buchwalder & Wanke
- Aristolochia gardneri Duch.
- Aristolochia gaudichaudii Duch.
- Aristolochia geantha Guo, Wang, Onyenedum, & Li
- Aristolochia gehrtii Hoehne
- Aristolochia geniculata E.Nardi
- Aristolochia gentilis Franch.
- Aristolochia gibertii Hook.
- Aristolochia gigantea Mart. & Zucc.
- Aristolochia ginzbergeri Ahumada
- Aristolochia glaberrima Hassl.
- Aristolochia glandulosa Scheidw.
- Aristolochia glaucifolia Ridl.
- Aristolochia glossa Pfeifer
- Aristolochia goldieana Hook.f.
- Aristolochia goliathiana Mich.J.Parsons
- Aristolochia gongchengensis Y.S.Huang, Y.D.Peng & C.R.Lin
- Aristolochia goudotii Duch.
- Aristolochia gracilifolia O.C.Schmidt
- Aristolochia gracilipedunculata F.González
- Aristolochia gracilis Duch.
- Aristolochia grandiflora Sw.
- Aristolochia grandis Craib
- Aristolochia griffithii Hook.f. & Thomson ex Duch.
- Aristolochia guadalajarana S.Watson
- Aristolochia × gueneri Malyer & Tosunoğlu
- Aristolochia guentheri O.C.Schmidt
- Aristolochia guianensis Poncy
- Aristolochia guichardii P.H.Davis & M.S.Khan
- Aristolochia gurinderi K.Ravik., U.L.Tiwari & N.Balach.
- Aristolochia × gypsicola Tosunoğlu & Malyer
- Aristolochia hainanensis Merr.
- Aristolochia haitiensis Ekman & O.C.Schmidt
- Aristolochia hansenii Phuph.
- Aristolochia harmandiana Pierre ex Lecomte
- Aristolochia helix Phuph.
- Aristolochia heppii Merxm.
- Aristolochia heterophylla Hemsl.
- Aristolochia hians Willd.
- Aristolochia hilariana Duch.
- Aristolochia hirta L.
- Aristolochia hispida Pohl ex Duch.
- Aristolochia hockii De Wild.
- Aristolochia hoehneana O.C.Schmidt
- Aristolochia hohuanensis S.S.Ying
- Aristolochia holostylis F.González
- Aristolochia holtzei F.Muell.
- Aristolochia howii Merr. & Chun
- Aristolochia huanjiangensis Yan Liu & L.Wu
- Aristolochia huberiana S.Moore
- Aristolochia huebneriana O.C.Schmidt
- Aristolochia humilis Merr.
- Aristolochia hyperxantha X.X.Zhu & J.S.Ma
- Aristolochia hypoglauca Kuhlm.
- Aristolochia hyrcana P.H.Davis & M.S.Khan
- Aristolochia iberica Fisch. & C.A.Mey. ex Boiss.
- Aristolochia impressinervis C.F.Liang
- Aristolochia impudica J.F.Ortega
- Aristolochia incisa Duch.
- Aristolochia incisiloba Jongkind
- Aristolochia indica L.
- Aristolochia inflata Kunth
- Aristolochia insolita J.Freitas & M.Peixoto
- Aristolochia involuta X.X.Zhu, Z.X.Ma & J.S.Ma
- Aristolochia iquitensis O.C.Schmidt
- Aristolochia islandica Pfeifer
- Aristolochia jackii Steud.
- Aristolochia jianfenglingensis Han Xu, Y.D.Li & H.Q.Chen
- Aristolochia jingiangensis H.Zhang & C.K.Hsieh
- Aristolochia kaempferi Willd.
- Aristolochia karwinskii Duch.
- Aristolochia kechangensis Y.D.Peng & L.Y.Yu
- Aristolochia kepara (Mich.J.Parsons) Buchwalder & Wanke
- Aristolochia keratuma F.González & Pabón-Mora
- Aristolochia killipiana O.C.Schmidt
- Aristolochia klossii Ridl.
- Aristolochia klugii O.C.Schmidt
- Aristolochia kongkandae Phuph.
- Aristolochia krausei P.H.Davis
- Aristolochia krisagathra Sivar. & Pradeep
- Aristolochia krukoffii O.C.Schmidt
- Aristolochia kunmingensis C.Y.Cheng & J.S.Ma
- Aristolochia kwangsiensis Chun & F.C.How ex C.F.Liang
- Aristolochia labiata Willd.
- Aristolochia lagesiana Ule ex Pilg.
- Aristolochia laheyana (F.M.Bailey) Buchwalder & Wanke
- Aristolochia lanceolatolorata S.Moore
- Aristolochia lassa I.M.Johnst.
- Aristolochia lauterbachiana O.C.Schmidt
- Aristolochia ledongensis Han Xu, Y.D.Li & H.J.Yang
- Aristolochia leonensis Mast.
- Aristolochia leprieurii Duch.
- Aristolochia leptosticta Urb.
- Aristolochia leuconeura Linden
- Aristolochia leytensis Merr.
- Aristolochia liangshanensis Z.L.Yang
- Aristolochia limai Hoehne
- Aristolochia lindeniana Duch.
- Aristolochia lindneri A.Berger
- Aristolochia linearifolia C.Wright ex Griseb.
- Aristolochia lingua Malme
- Aristolochia lingulata Ule ex Pilg.
- Aristolochia linnemannii Warb.
- Aristolochia littoralis Parodi
- Aristolochia liukiuensis Hatus.
- Aristolochia longgangensis C.F.Liang
- Aristolochia longiflora Engelm. & A.Gray
- Aristolochia longispathulata F.González
- Aristolochia longlinensis Yan Liu & L.Wu
- Aristolochia lorenae J.Freitas & F.González
- Aristolochia lozaniana F.González
- Aristolochia lutea Desf.
- Aristolochia lutescens Duch.
- Aristolochia luzmariana Santana Mich.
- Aristolochia lycica P.H.Davis & M.S.Khan
- Aristolochia macedonica Bornm.
- Aristolochia macgregorii Merr.
- Aristolochia macrocarpa Duch.
- Aristolochia macrophylla Lam.
- Aristolochia macroura Ortega
- Aristolochia malacophylla Standl.
- Aristolochia malmeana Hoehne
- Aristolochia manantlanensis Santana Mich.
- Aristolochia manaosensis Ahumada
- Aristolochia mannii Hook.f.
- Aristolochia manokwariensis (Mich.J.Parsons) Buchwalder & Wanke
- Aristolochia manshuriensis Kom.
- Aristolochia maranonensis O.C.Schmidt
- Aristolochia marianensis Ahumada
- Aristolochia marioniana Elad.Fernández & G.A.Romero
- Aristolochia mathewsii Duch.
- Aristolochia maurorum L.
- Aristolochia maxima Jacq.
- Aristolochia medicinalis R.E.Schult.
- Aristolochia meionantha (Hand.-Mazz.) X.X.Zhu & J.S.Ma
- Aristolochia melanocephala X.X.Zhu & J.S.Ma
- Aristolochia melanoglossa Speg.
- Aristolochia melastoma Silva Manso ex Duch.
- Aristolochia melgueiroi Barringer & F.Guánchez
- Aristolochia meridionaliana (Mich.J.Parsons) Buchwalder & Wanke
- Aristolochia meridionalis E.M.Ross
- Aristolochia merxmuelleri Greuter & E.Mayer
- Aristolochia micrantha Duch.
- Aristolochia microphylla Sessé & Moc.
- Aristolochia microstoma Boiss. & Spruner
- Aristolochia minutiflora Ridl. ex Gamble
- Aristolochia mishuyacensis O.C.Schmidt
- Aristolochia mollis Dunn
- Aristolochia mollissima Hance
- Aristolochia momandul K.Schum.
- Aristolochia montana Ekman & O.C.Schmidt
- Aristolochia monticola Brandegee
- Aristolochia morae F.González
- Aristolochia mossii S.Moore
- Aristolochia moupinensis Franch.
- Aristolochia mulunensis Y.S.Huang & Yan Liu
- Aristolochia mutabilis Pfeifer
- Aristolochia mycteria Pfeifer
- Aristolochia nahua Paizanni & Santana Mich.
- Aristolochia nakaoi F.Maek.
- Aristolochia nana S.Watson
- Aristolochia nardiana I.M.Turner
- Aristolochia nauseifolia Mich.J.Parsons
- Aristolochia navicularis E.Nardi
- Aristolochia naviculilimba Ding Hou
- Aristolochia neinhuisii T.V.Do
- Aristolochia nelsonii Eastw.
- Aristolochia neolongifolia J.L.Wu & Z.L.Yang
- Aristolochia nevesarmondiana Hoehne
- Aristolochia novoguineensis O.C.Schmidt
- Aristolochia nuichuaensis T.V.Do & Luu
- Aristolochia nummulariifolia Kunth
- Aristolochia oaxacana Eastw.
- Aristolochia obliqua S.M.Hwang
- Aristolochia oblongata Jacq.
- Aristolochia occidentalis Santana Mich. & S.Lemus
- Aristolochia odora Steud.
- Aristolochia odoratissima L.
- Aristolochia olivieri Colleg. ex Boiss.
- Aristolochia ophioides L.Marión
- Aristolochia oranensis Ahumada
- Aristolochia orbicularis Duch.
- Aristolochia ornithopterae Buchwalder & Wanke
- Aristolochia ovalifolia Duch.
- Aristolochia ovatifolia S.M.Hwang
- Aristolochia pacayacensis O.C.Schmidt
- Aristolochia pacifica Santana Mich. & Paizanni
- Aristolochia paecilantha Boiss.
- Aristolochia pallida Willd.
- Aristolochia palmeri S.Watson
- Aristolochia panamensis Standl.
- Aristolochia pannosoides Hoehne
- Aristolochia papillaris Mast.
- Aristolochia papillifolia Ding Hou
- Aristolochia paracleta Pfeifer
- Aristolochia paradisiana (Mich.J.Parsons) Buchwalder & Wanke
- Aristolochia paramaribensis Duch.
- Aristolochia parvifolia Sm.
- Aristolochia passiflorifolia A.Rich.
- Aristolochia paucinervis Pomel
- Aristolochia paulistana Hoehne
- Aristolochia peltata L.
- Aristolochia peltatodeltoidea Hoehne
- Aristolochia peninsularis Brandegee
- Aristolochia peninsulensis (Mich.J.Parsons) Buchwalder & Wanke
- Aristolochia pentandra Jacq.
- Aristolochia perangustifolia Phuph.
- Aristolochia peruviana O.C.Schmidt
- Aristolochia petelotii O.C.Schmidt
- Aristolochia petenensis Lundell
- Aristolochia pfeiferi Barringer
- Aristolochia phetchaburiensis Chuakul & Saralamp
- Aristolochia philippinensis Warb.
- Aristolochia phuphathanaphongiana T.V.Do
- Aristolochia physodes Ule
- Aristolochia pichinchensis Pfeifer
- Aristolochia pierrei Lecomte
- Aristolochia pilosa Kunth
- Aristolochia pilosistyla X.X.Zhu & J.S.Ma
- Aristolochia pistolochia L.
- Aristolochia pithecurus Ridl.
- Aristolochia platanifolia (Klotzsch) Duch.
- Aristolochia pohliana Duch.
- Aristolochia poluninii P.H.Davis & M.S.Khan
- Aristolochia polymorpha S.M.Hwang
- Aristolochia pontica Lam.
- Aristolochia poomae Phuph.
- Aristolochia pothieri Pierre ex Lecomte
- Aristolochia praevenosa F.Muell.
- Aristolochia preussii Engl.
- Aristolochia pringlei Rose
- Aristolochia promissa Mast.
- Aristolochia prostrata Duch.
- Aristolochia pseudocaulialata X.X.Zhu, J.N.Liu & J.S.Ma
- Aristolochia pseudotriangularis O.C.Schmidt
- Aristolochia pseudoutriformis X.X.Zhu & J.S.Ma
- Aristolochia pubera R.Br.
- Aristolochia pubescens Willd. ex Duch.
- Aristolochia pueblana J.F.Ortega & R.V.Ortega
- Aristolochia punctata Lam.
- Aristolochia punjabensis Lace
- Aristolochia purhepecha Santana Mich. & Cuevas
- Aristolochia purpusii Brandegee
- Aristolochia putumayensis O.C.Schmidt
- Aristolochia quangbinhensis T.V.Do
- Aristolochia quercetorum Standl.
- Aristolochia raja Mart.
- Aristolochia repanda D.Subram.
- Aristolochia reticulata Nutt.
- Aristolochia rhizantha Lundell
- Aristolochia ridicula N.E.Br.
- Aristolochia rigida Duch.
- Aristolochia ringens Vahl
- Aristolochia robertii Ahumada
- Aristolochia rostrata Pfeifer
- Aristolochia rotunda L.
- Aristolochia rugosa Lam.
- Aristolochia ruiziana (Klotzsch) Duch.
- Aristolochia rumicifolia Mart.
- Aristolochia rumphii Kostel.
- Aristolochia rzedowskiana Santana Mich. & Guzm.-Hern.
- Aristolochia saccata Wall.
- Aristolochia salweenensis C.Y.Cheng & J.S.Ma
- Aristolochia samanensis O.C.Schmidt
- Aristolochia samarensis Merr.
- Aristolochia savannoidea Paizanni & M.Ramírez
- Aristolochia schippii Standl.
- Aristolochia schlechteri Lauterb.
- Aristolochia schmidtiana Hoehne
- Aristolochia schottii L.Marión
- Aristolochia schreiteri Ahumada
- Aristolochia schultzeana O.C.Schmidt
- Aristolochia schulzii Ahumada
- Aristolochia schunkeana F.González
- Aristolochia scytophylla S.M.Hwang & D.Y.Chen
- Aristolochia secunda Pfeifer
- Aristolochia sempervirens L.
- Aristolochia sepicola Mast.
- Aristolochia sepikensis (Mich.J.Parsons) Buchwalder & Wanke
- Aristolochia sericea Blanco
- Aristolochia serpentaria L.
- Aristolochia sessilifolia (Klotzsch) Duch.
- Aristolochia setosa Duch.
- Aristolochia shimadae Hayata
- Aristolochia sicula Tineo
- Aristolochia silvatica Barb.Rodr.
- Aristolochia sinaloae Brandegee
- Aristolochia singalangensis Korth. ex Ding Hou
- Aristolochia sinoburmanica Y.H.Tan & B.Yang
- Aristolochia smilacina Duch.
- Aristolochia socorroensis Pfeifer
- Aristolochia sparusifolia (Mich.J.Parsons) Buchwalder & Wanke
- Aristolochia stahelii O.C.Schmidt
- Aristolochia stenocarpa Kuntze
- Aristolochia stenosiphon P.H.Davis & M.S.Khan
- Aristolochia steupii Woronow
- Aristolochia stevensii Barringer
- Aristolochia steyermarkii Standl.
- Aristolochia stomachoidis Hoehne
- Aristolochia stuckertii Speg.
- Aristolochia styoglossa Pfeifer
- Aristolochia subglobosa J.Freitas, Lírio & F.González
- Aristolochia surinamensis Willd.
- Aristolochia tadungensis T.V.Do & Luu
- Aristolochia tagala Cham.
- Aristolochia taliscana Hook. & Arn.
- Aristolochia tamnifolia (Klotzsch) Duch.
- Aristolochia tanzawana (Kigawa) Watan.-Toma & Ohi-Toma
- Aristolochia tapilulensis Beutelsp.
- Aristolochia tentaculata O.C.Schmidt
- Aristolochia tequilana S.Watson
- Aristolochia teretiflora Pfeifer
- Aristolochia thibetica Franch.
- Aristolochia thozetii F.Muell.
- Aristolochia thwaitesii Hook.
- Aristolochia tigrina A.Rich.
- Aristolochia tithonusiana (Mich.J.Parsons) Buchwalder & Wanke
- Aristolochia tomentosa Sims
- Aristolochia tonduzii O.C.Schmidt
- Aristolochia tongbiguanensis J.Y.Shen, Q.B.Gong & Landrein
- Aristolochia tonkinensis T.V.Do & Wanke
- Aristolochia transsecta (Chatterjee) C.Y.Wu
- Aristolochia transtillifera Ding Hou
- Aristolochia tresmariae Ferris
- Aristolochia triactina Hook.f.
- Aristolochia trianae Duch.
- Aristolochia triangularis Cham.
- Aristolochia tricaudata Lem.
- Aristolochia trichostoma Griseb.
- Aristolochia trilobata L.
- Aristolochia trulliformis Mast.
- Aristolochia truncata Fielding & Gardner
- Aristolochia tuberosa C.F.Liang & S.M.Hwang
- Aristolochia tubiflora Dunn
- Aristolochia tuitensis Santana Mich. & Paizanni
- Aristolochia tyrrhena E.Nardi & Arrigoni
- Aristolochia urbaniana Taub.
- Aristolochia urupaensis Hoehne
- Aristolochia utriformis S.M.Hwang
- Aristolochia vallisicola T.L.Yao
- Aristolochia variifolia Duch.
- Aristolochia veracruzana J.F.Ortega
- Aristolochia versabilifolia Pfeifer
- Aristolochia versicolor S.M.Hwang
- Aristolochia viperina (Chodat & Hassl.) Chodat & Hassl.
- Aristolochia vitiensis A.C.Sm.
- Aristolochia wardiana J.S.Ma
- Aristolochia warmingii Mast.
- Aristolochia watsonii Wooton & Standl.
- Aristolochia weberbaueri O.C.Schmidt
- Aristolochia weddellii Duch.
- Aristolochia weixiensis X.X.Zhu & J.S.Ma
- Aristolochia wendeliana Hoehne
- Aristolochia wenshanensis Lei Cai, D.M.He & Z.L.Dao
- Aristolochia werdermanniana O.C.Schmidt
- Aristolochia westlandii Hemsl.
- Aristolochia whitei I.M.Johnst.
- Aristolochia williamsii Rusby
- Aristolochia wrightii Seem.
- Aristolochia wuana Zhen W.Liu & Y.F.Deng
- Aristolochia xerophytica R.E.Schult.
- Aristolochia xuanlienensis N.T.T.Huong, B.H.Quang & J.S.Ma
- Aristolochia yachangensis B.G.Huang, Yan Liu & Y.S.Huang
- Aristolochia yalaensis Phuph.
- Aristolochia yangii X.X.Zhu & J.S.Ma
- Aristolochia yujungiana C.T.Lu & J.C.Wang
- Aristolochia yungasensis Rusby
- Aristolochia yunnanensis Franch.
- Aristolochia zebrina J.Freitas & F.González
- Aristolochia zenkeri Engl.
- Aristolochia zhongdianensis J.S.Ma
- Aristolochia zollingeriana Miq.
