= Pararistolochia =

Formerly accepted genus of flowering plants

Pararistolochia is a formerly accepted genus in the plant family Aristolochiaceae. As of March 2023, it is considered a synonym of the genus Aristolochia.

== Selected species ==
Species that have been placed in Pararistolochia include:

- Pararistolochia australopithecurus M.J.Parsons → Aristolochia australopithecurus – Australasian
- Pararistolochia ceropegioides (S.Moore) Hutch. & Dalz. → Aristolochia ceropegioides – African
- Pararistolochia enricoi Luino, L.Gaut & Callm. – Malagasy
- Pararistolochia goldieana (Hook.f.) Hutch. & Dalz. → Aristolochia goldieana – African
- Pararistolochia macrocarpa (Duch.) Poncy → Aristolochia macrocarpa – African
- Pararistolochia praevenosa (F.Muell.) M.J. Parsons → Aristolochia praevenosa – Australasian
- Pararistolochia preussii (Engl.) Hutch. & Dalziel → Aristolochia preussii – African
- Pararistolochia schlechteri (Laut.) M.J.Parsons → Aristolochia schlechteri – Australasian
