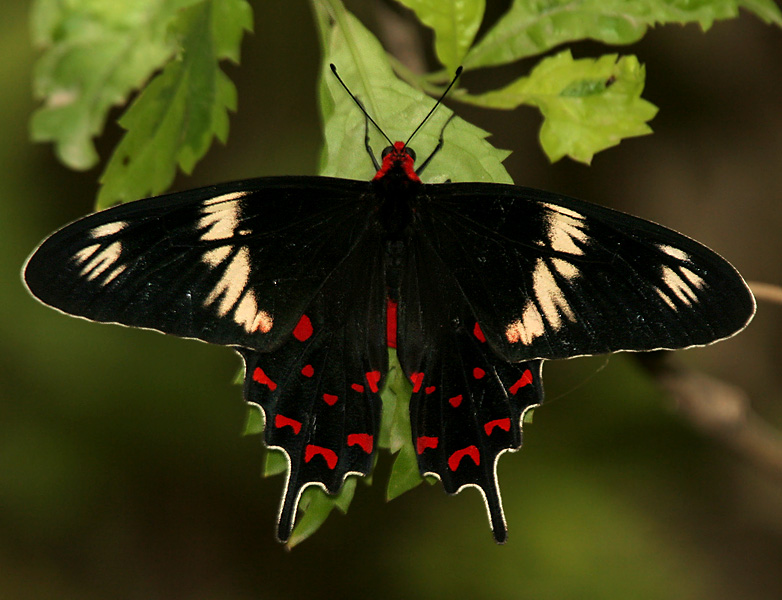
- Male in Hyderabad, India
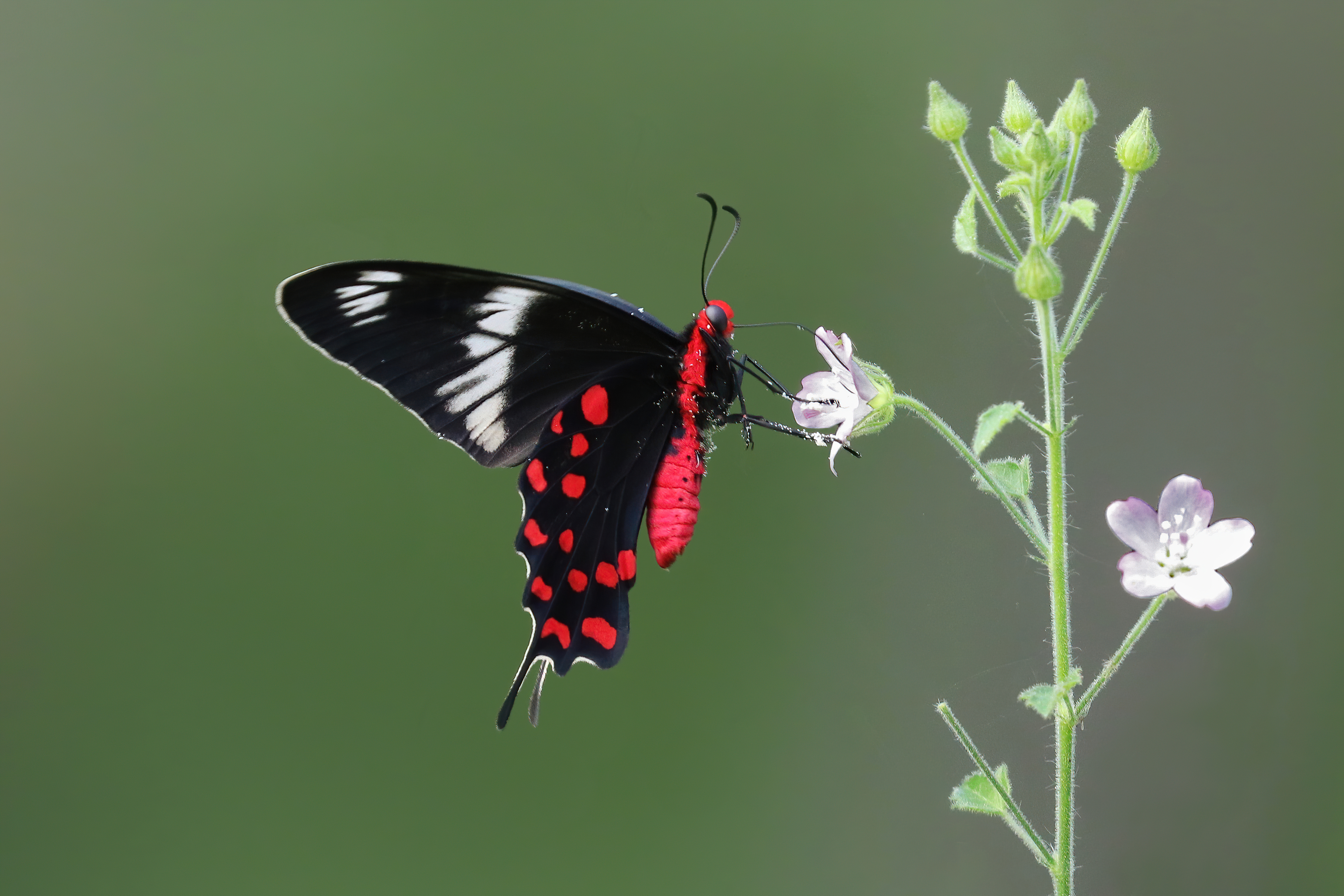
- In Kerala, India

Conservation status
- Least Concern (IUCN 3.1)

Scientific classification
- Kingdom: Animalia
- Phylum: Arthropoda
- Clade: Pancrustacea
- Class: Insecta
- Order: Lepidoptera
- Family: Papilionidae
- Genus: Pachliopta
- Species: P. hector

Binomial name
- Pachliopta hector (Linnaeus, 1758)

Synonyms
- Atrophaneura hector

= Pachliopta hector =

Crimson rose

Species of South Asian butterfly

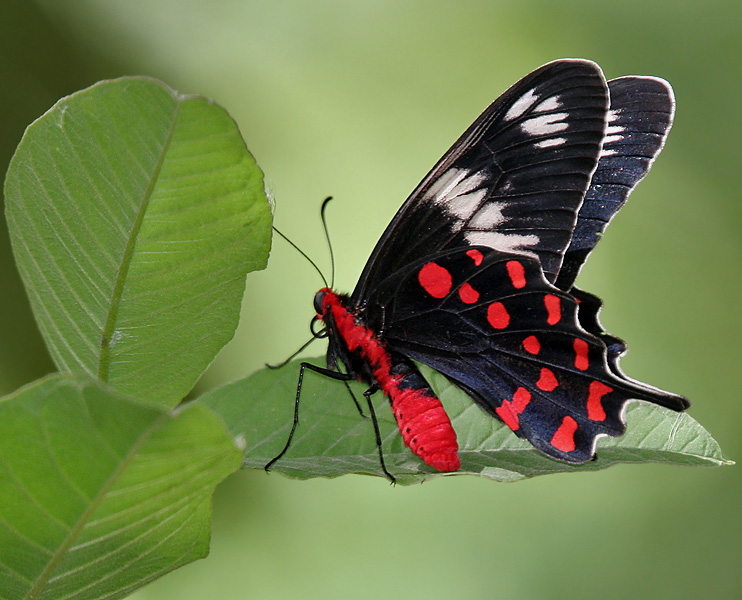
Male in Hyderabad, India

Pachliopta hector, the crimson rose, is a large swallowtail butterfly belonging to the genus Pachliopta (roses) of the red-bodied swallowtails.

== Range ==
It is found in Pakistan, India, Sri Lanka, Maldives and possibly the coast of western Myanmar.

In India, it is found in the Western Ghats, southern India (Tamil Nadu, Kerala), eastern India (West Bengal and Odisha). It is a straggler in the Andaman Islands.

== Status ==
The IUCN classified the species as Least Concern in 2019.It is common all along the Western Ghats up to Maharashtra but rare in Gujarat. This species is protected by law in India.

== Description ==
The male's upper side is black. The forewing consist of a broad white interrupted band from the subcostal nervure opposite the origin of veins 10 and 11, extended obliquely to the tornus, and a second short pre-apical similar band; both bands composed of detached irregularly indented broad streaks in the interspaces. Distal posteriorly strongly curved series of seven crimson spots, followed by a subterminal series of crimson lunules on the hindwing. Cilia black alternated with white. The underside of the forewing is dull brownish black and the hindwing is black. There is markings on the upper side, but the crimson spots and crescent-shaped markings on the hindwing larger. The antennae, thorax and upper abdomen at base are black. The head and rest of the abdomen is a bright crimson. Beneath the palpi, the sides of the thorax and abdomen are also crimson.

The female is mostly similar. However, the discal series of spots and subterminal lunules are much duller and are pale crimson irrorated (sprinkled) with black scales. In some specimens the anterior spots and lunules are almost white and barely tinged with crimson. The top of the abdomen is coloured black which extended further towards the apex.

No geographic races have been described.

== Habitat ==
This butterfly is at home both in jungle and in open country. During the dry season, it will be found up to 2400 m (8000 feet) in South India, but it is found all the year round at lower elevations.

== Habits ==
The crimson rose is very fond of flowers, especially Lantana. Nectar appears to be essential for the butterfly and a higher nectar intake is thought to increase egg production.

Close to the ground, the flight of the crimson rose is slow and fluttering but steady. At greater heights, it flies faster and stronger. It basks with its wings spread flat, sometimes in small congregations at heights of 10 to 15 metres up in the trees.

The butterfly often roosts for the night in large companies on the twigs and branches of trees and shrubs, sometimes accompanied by a few common Mormons. When resting the butterfly draws its forewings halfway between the hindwings. The butterfly sleeps on slanting outstretched branches or twigs of trees or bushes.

=== Aposematism and mimicry ===
The red body, slow peculiar flight, bright colouration and pattern of the wings are meant to indicate to predators that this butterfly is inedible, being well protected by the poisons it has sequestered from its larval food plant. Its flight and behaviour is much like that of the common Mormon. Like that butterfly, it too is inedible and rarely attacked by predators. This has led to this butterfly also being mimicked by a female morph of the common Mormon (Papilio polytes), in this case, the female form romulus.

=== Migration ===
The most striking aspect of the butterfly's behaviour is its strong migratory tendencies. During the peak of its season, several thousand crimson roses can be found congregating and then they begin migrating to other areas.

In the Entomologist's Monthly Magazine, 1880, p. 276, Mr. R. S. Eaton notes that in Bombay this butterfly roosted in great numbers together, however Charles Thomas Bingham notes that in the Western Ghats between Vengurla and Belgaum, where the butterfly occurred in some numbers and had the habit of roosting in company on twigs of some thorny shrub, but never saw more than "a score or so together".

== Life cycle ==
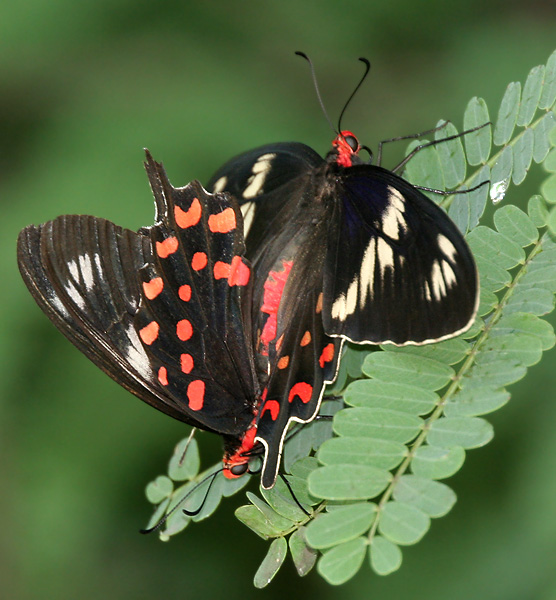
Mating

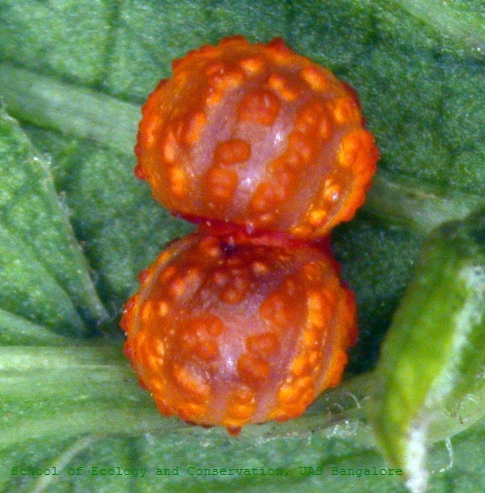
Egg

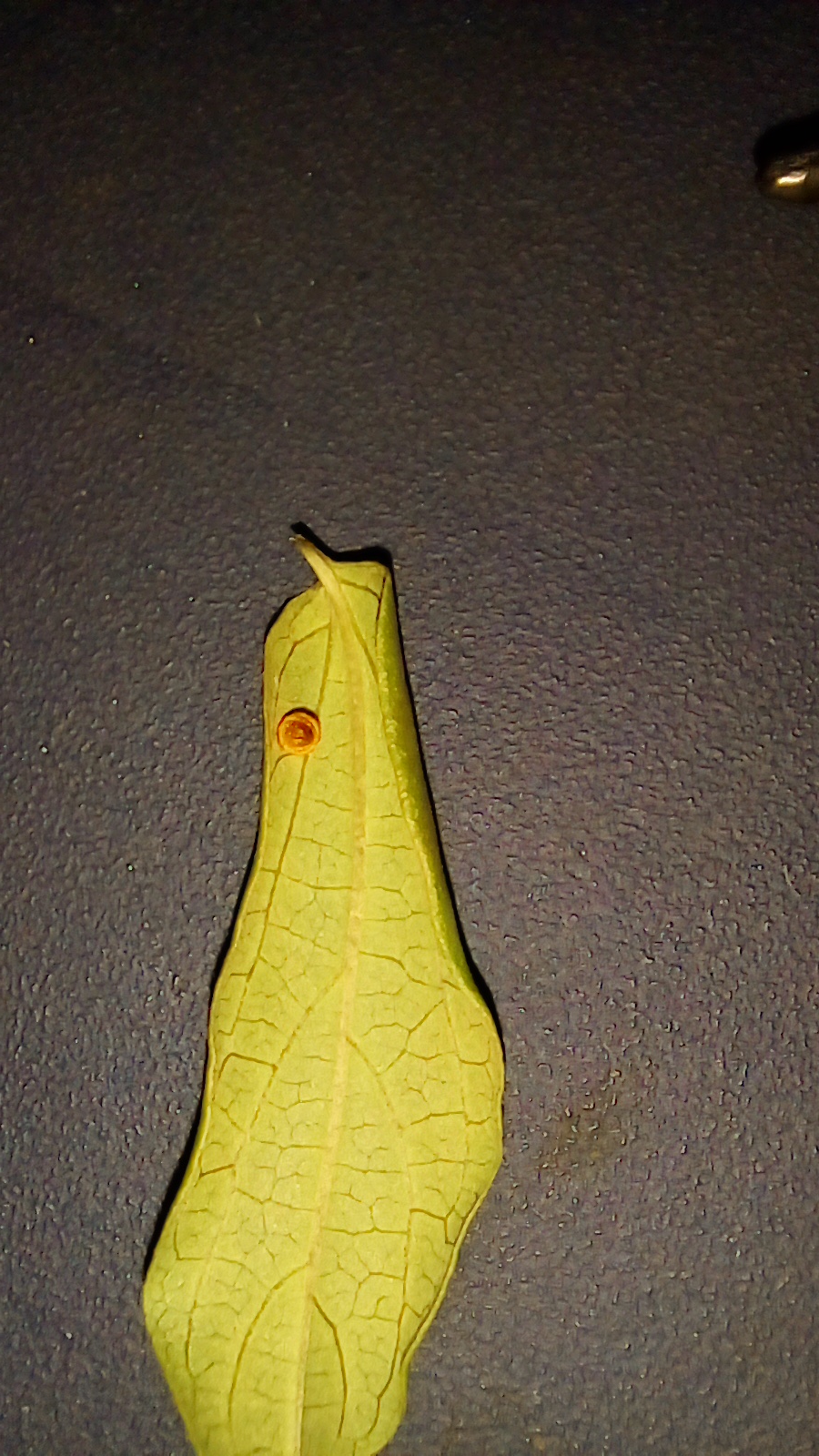
Egg

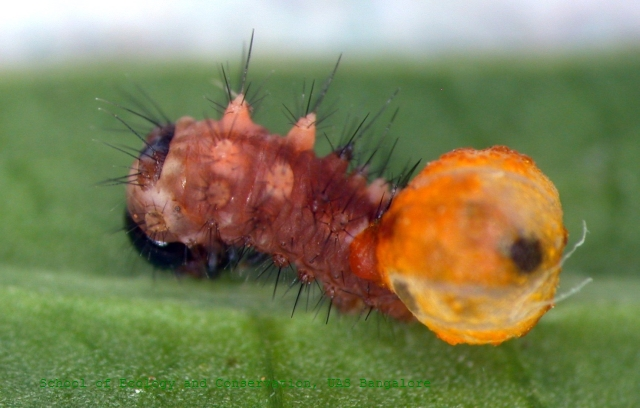
Hatching

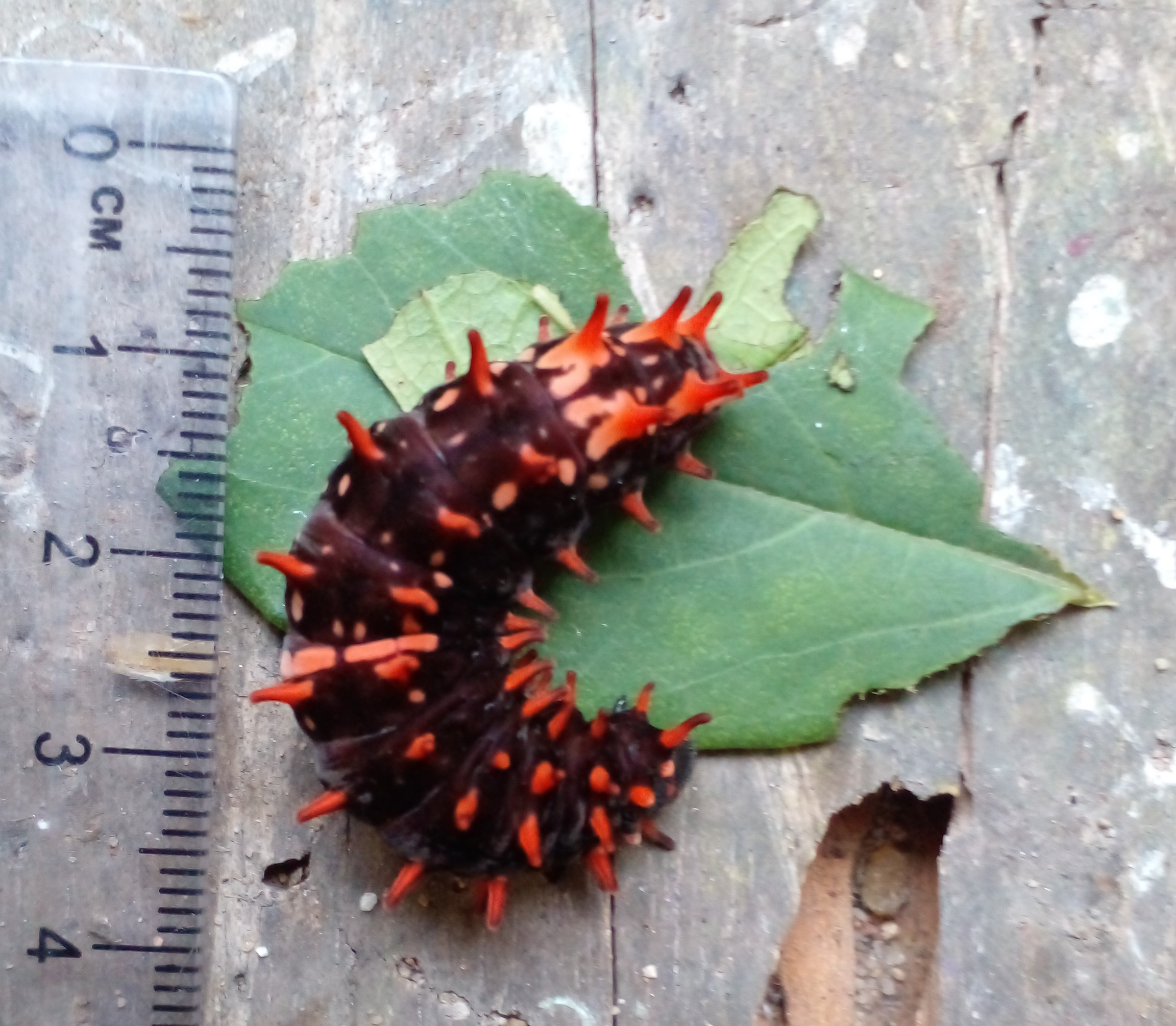
Caterpillar

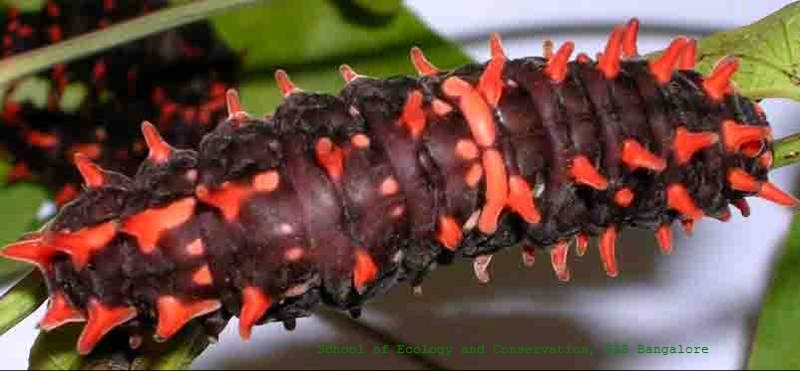
Caterpillar

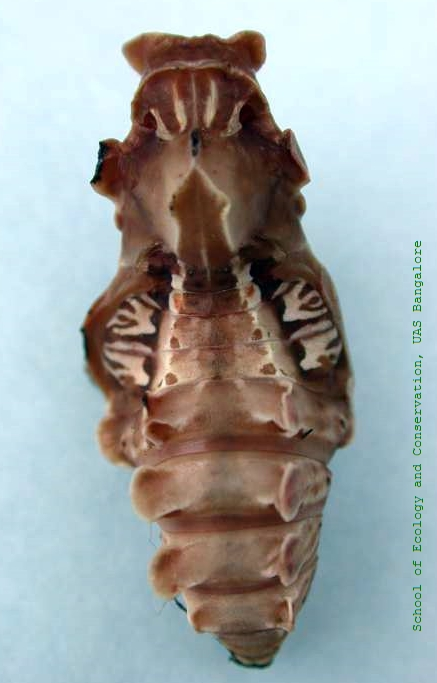
Chrysalis

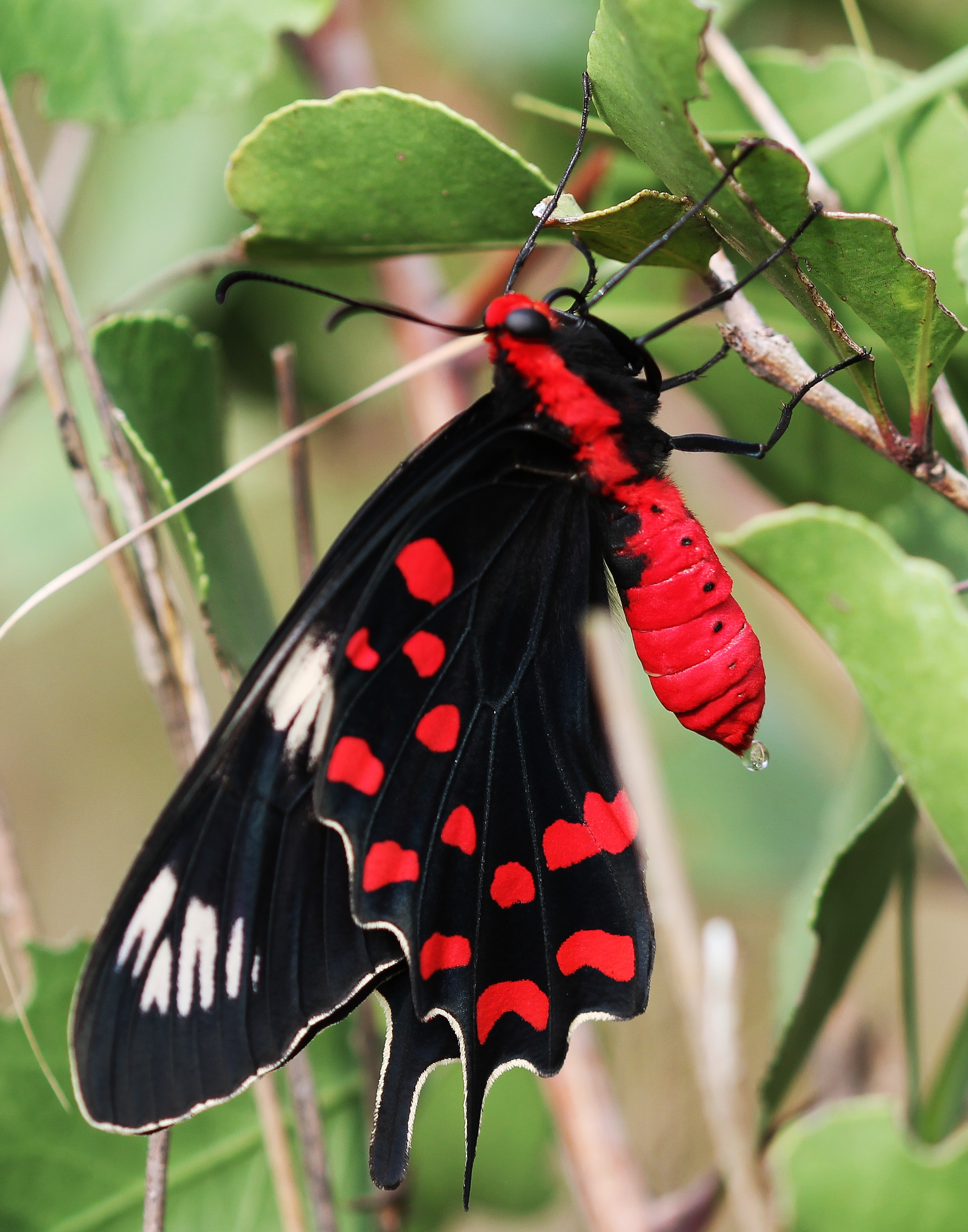
Freshly emerged specimen

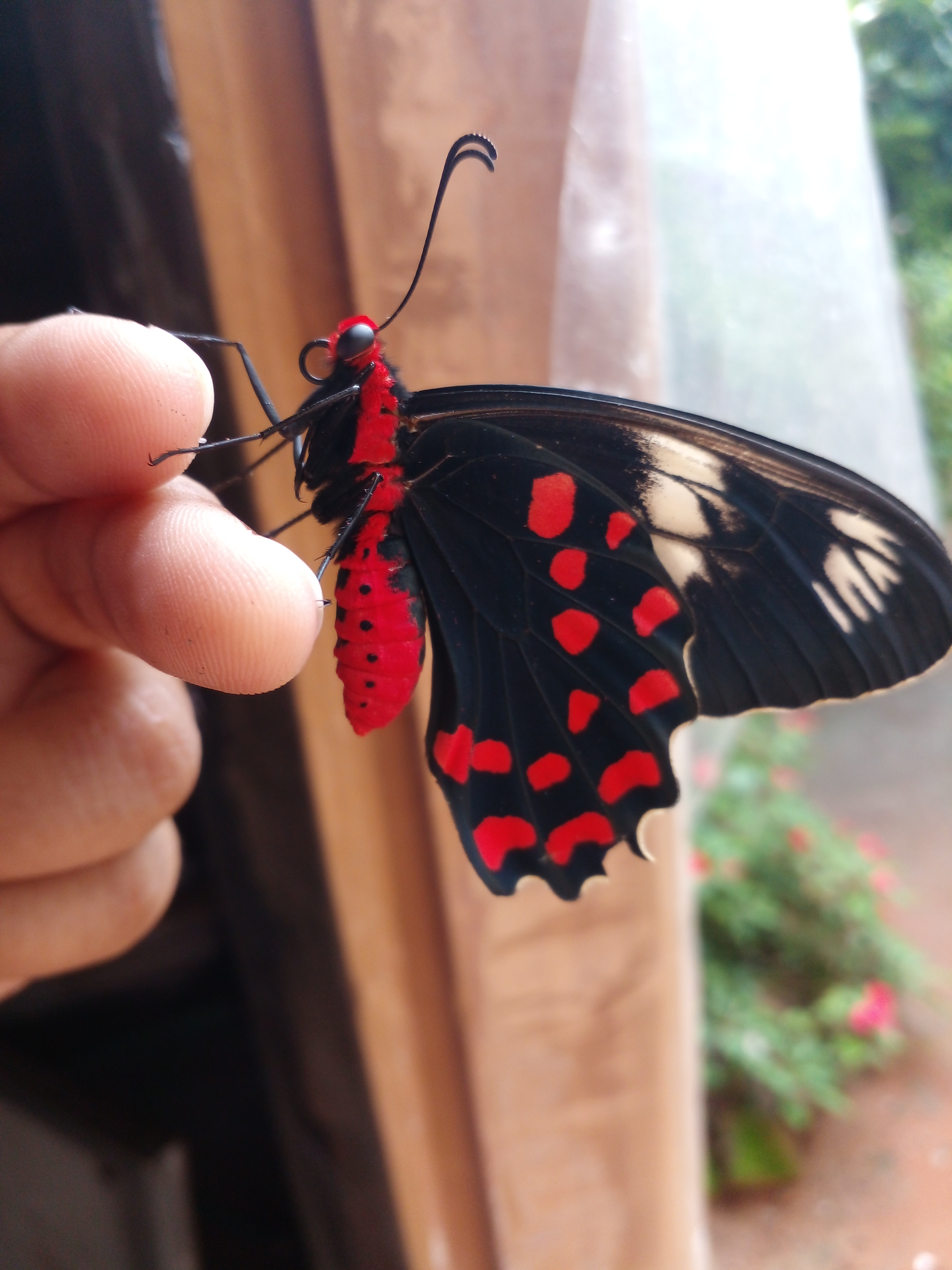
Newly Emerged

Higher numbers of them are seen from August to November and also from April to June. They breed up to seven times per year and it has been found to take only 39–47 days from egg to adult.

=== Eggs ===
Similar to those of the common rose, the eggs hatch in seven days.

=== Caterpillars ===
The caterpillars of the crimson rose are similar to those of the common rose butterflies, but are purplish black or blackish brown with a little bit of red, pink and orange colors on their wings. They have a black head and orange osmeterium. Their bodies are fat, with orange-red tubercles and a prominent yellowish-white band transversely placed on segments six to eight. The caterpillar has five instars. The caterpillars are known to display cannibalistic behaviour.

=== Pupa ===
The pupa is pinkish brown with darker expanded wing cases. The wing-like expansions on the abdomen are distinctive.

=== Food plants ===
The larvae of the species breed on various species of Aristolochia including Aristolochia indica, Aristolochia bracteolata, and Thottea siliquosa. The species is unpalatable as they sequester chemical compounds in their larval stages including aristolochic acid from the host plants.

=== Nectar resources ===
The nectar sources of the crimson rose with details of the flowering period are as follows:

- Adathoda zeylonica January–March
- Albizzia lebbeck March–June
- Anacardium occidentale December–March
- Antigonon leptopus year-long
- Bougainvillea spectabilis year-long
- Caesalpinia pulcherrima year-long
- Capparis spinosa December–February
- Carissa carandus year-long (April–July)
- Catharanthus roseus year-long
- Citheroxylum subserratum April–June
- Clerodendrum infortunatum February–April
- Duranta repens June–December
- Hibiscus rosa-sinensis year-long
- Hyptis suaveolens September–January
- Jasminum angustifolium June–August
- Lantana camara year-long
- Muntingia calabura year-long
- Nerium odorum year-long
- Premna latifolia March–August
- Sida acuta August–December
- Sida cordifolia August–December
- Stachytarpheta indica June–September
- Wrightia tinctoria April–June
- Zizyphus oenoplia August–December and March–June

== Etymology ==
In common with other early naturalists Linnaeus followed the classical tradition. The name honours the Greek hero Hector.
