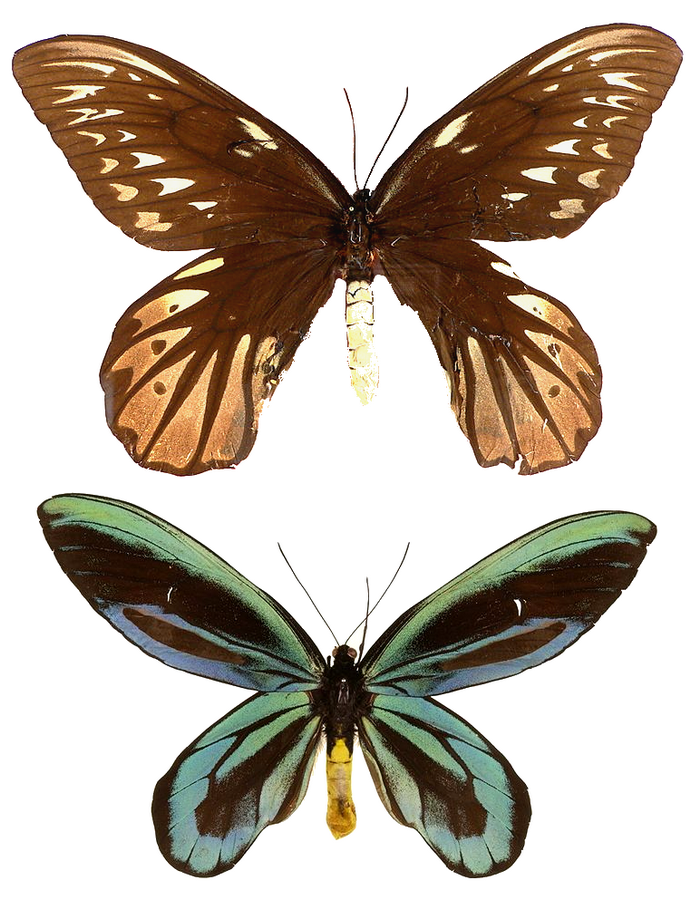
- Female (above) and male (below), not to scale

Conservation status
- Endangered (IUCN 3.1)
- CITES Appendix I

Scientific classification
- Kingdom: Animalia
- Phylum: Arthropoda
- Class: Insecta
- Order: Lepidoptera
- Family: Papilionidae
- Genus: Ornithoptera
- Subgenus: Straatmana; Deslisle, 2007
- Species: O. alexandrae

Binomial name
- Ornithoptera alexandrae (Rothschild, 1907)

Synonyms
- Troides alexandrae Rothschild, 1907

= Queen Alexandra's birdwing =

Largest species of butterfly

Ornithoptera alexandrae, the Queen Alexandra's birdwing, is the largest species of butterfly in the world, with females reaching wingspans slightly in excess of 25 to 28 cm (10 to 11 in). This birdwing is restricted to the forests of the Oro Province in eastern Papua New Guinea.

The species is endangered and one of only four insects to be listed on Appendix I of CITES, making commercial international trade illegal. The other three insects listed are butterflies as well. They are the Parides burchellanus, Papilio homerus, Papilio chikae chikae (plus subspecies chikae hermeli).

== History ==
The species was discovered in 1906 by Albert Stewart Meek, a collector employed by Walter Rothschild to collect natural history specimens from New Guinea. In the next year, Rothschild named the species in honour of Alexandra of Denmark. Although the first specimen was taken with the aid of a small shotgun, Meek soon discovered the early stages and bred out most of the first specimens.

Though most authorities now classify this species in the genus Ornithoptera, it has formerly been placed in the genus Troides or the now defunct genus Aethoptera. In 2001 the lepidopterist Gilles Deslisle proposed placing it in its own subgenus (which some writers have treated as a genus); he originally proposed the name Zeunera, but this is a junior homonym (with Zeunera Piton 1936 [Orthoptera]), and his replacement is Straatmana.

== Description ==
Female: Female Queen Alexandra's birdwings are larger than males with markedly rounder, broader wings. The female can reach, and slightly exceed, a wingspan of 25 to 28 cm (10 to 11 in), a body length of 8 cm (3.1 in) and a body mass of up to 12 g (0.42 oz), all enormous measurements for a butterfly. The female has brown wings with white markings arranged as two rows of chevrons. The hindwings are brown with a submarginal line of centred yellow triangles. The body is cream coloured and there is a small section of red fur on the brown thorax.

Male: There is sexual dimorphism in this species. The wings are long with angular apices. They are iridescent bluish green with a black central band. There is a pronounced sex brand. The underside is green or blue green with black veins. Males are smaller than females. The abdomen is bright yellow. The wingspan of the males can be approximately 20 cm (8 in), but more usually about 16 cm (6.3 in). A spectacular form of the male is form atavus, which has gold spots on the hindwings.

== Biology ==
=== Eggs ===
The eggs are large, light yellow and flattened at the base, fixated to the surface on which they are laid by a bright-orange substance. Under ideal conditions, the female Queen Alexandra's Birdwing is capable of laying over 240 eggs throughout its life.

=== Larva ===
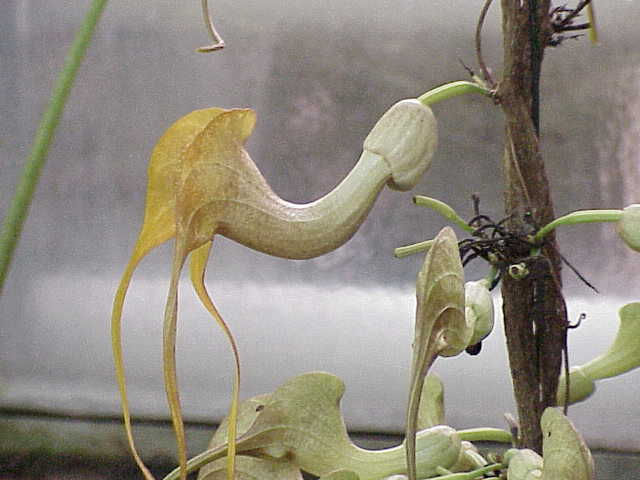
Pararistolochia (some species were formerly Aristolochia)

Newly emerged larvae eat their own eggshells before feeding on fresh foliage. The larva is black with red tubercles and has a cream-coloured band or saddle in the middle of its body.

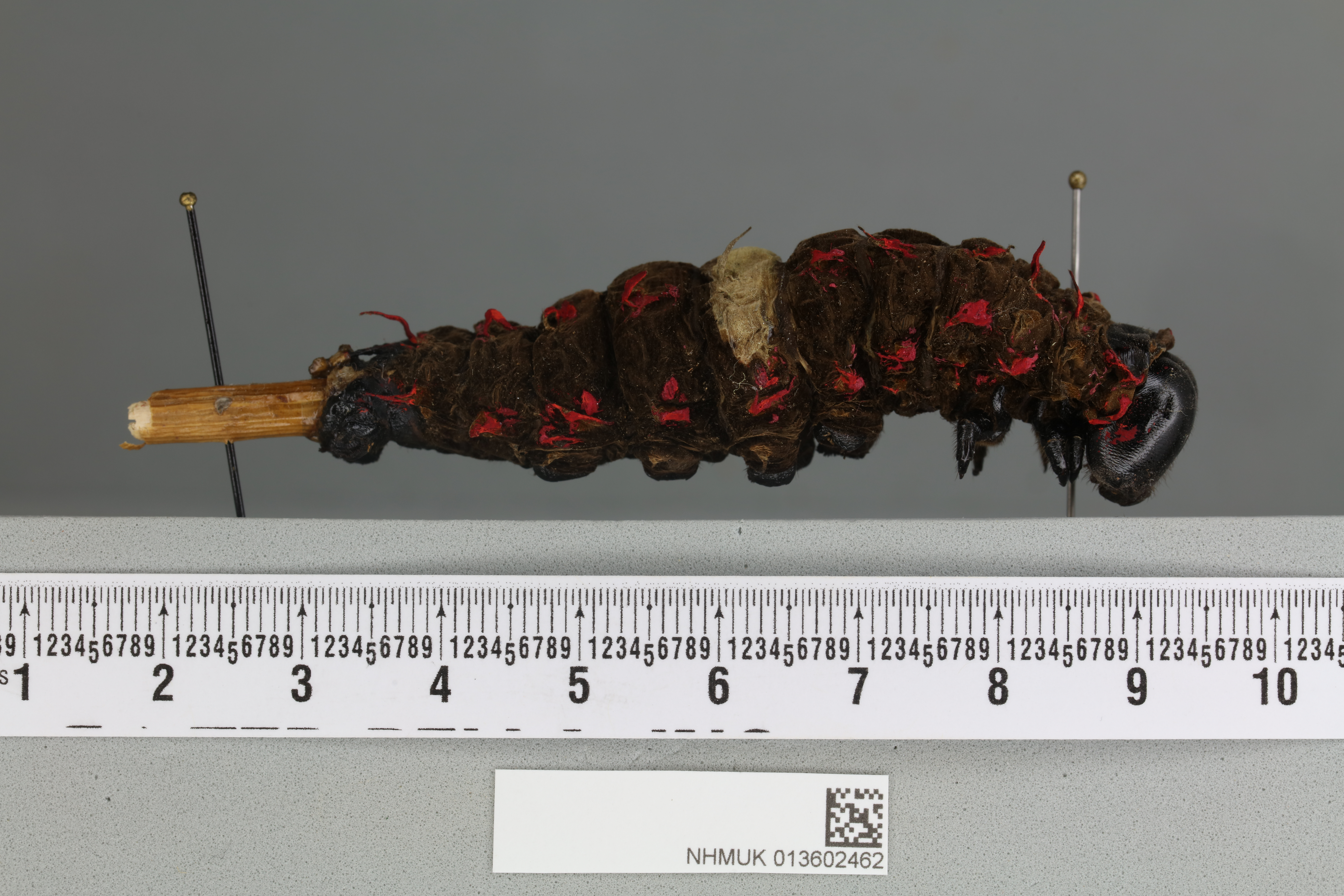
A lateral photograph of the Queen Alexandra Birdwing Butterfly caterpillar.

Larvae of this species feed on the shell from which they hatched and then start to extract nutrients from pipe vines of the genus Pararistolochia (family Aristolochiaceae), including P. dielsiana and P. schlecteri. They feed initially on fresh foliage of the host plants and their own eggs, ultimately causing ringbark to the vine before pupating. Plants of the family Aristolochiaceae contain aristolochic acids in their leaves and stems. This is believed to be a potent vertebrate poison and is accumulated by larvae during their development.

=== Pupa ===
The pupa is golden yellow or tan in colour with black markings. Male pupae may be distinguished by a faint charcoal patch on the wing cases; this becomes a band of special scales in the adult butterfly called a sex brand. The time taken for this species to develop from egg to pupa is approximately six weeks, with the pupal stage taking a month or more. Adults emerge from the pupae early in the morning while humidity is still high, as the enormous wings may dry out before they have fully expanded if the humidity drops.

=== Imago ===
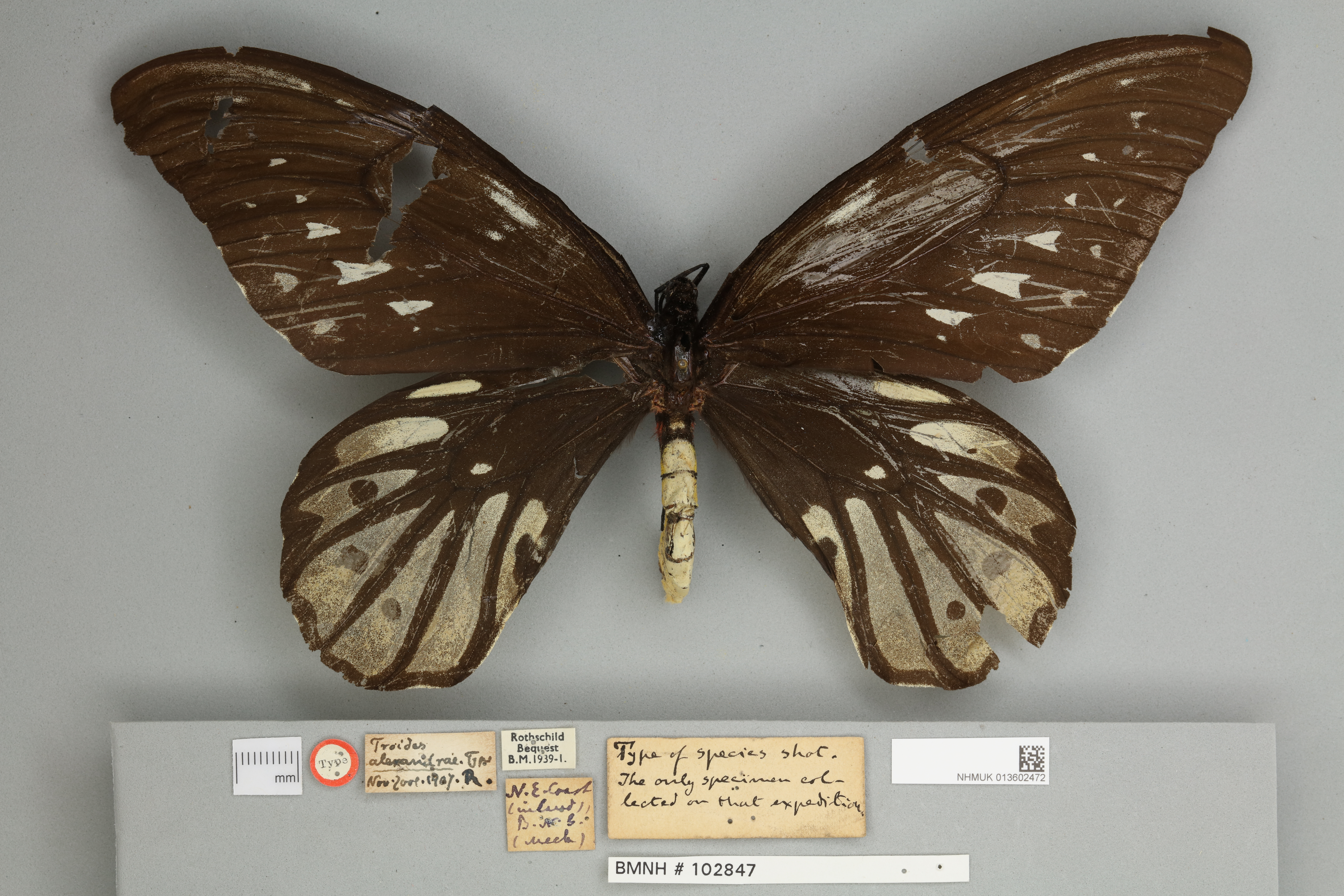
A dorsal photograph of the Holotype female of Queen Alexandra's Birdwing Butterfly.

The adults may live for three months or more and have few predators, excluding large orb weaving spiders (Nephila species) and some small birds. Adults feed at flowers providing a broad platform for the adults to land on, including Hibiscus. The adults are powerful fliers most active in the early morning and again at dusk when they actively feed at flowers.

Males also patrol areas of the host plants for newly emerged females early in the morning. Females may be seen searching for host plants for most of the day. Courtship is brief but spectacular; males hover above a potential mate, dousing her with a pheromone to induce mating. Receptive females will allow the male to land and pair, while unreceptive females will fly off or otherwise discourage mating. Males are strongly territorial and will see off potential rivals, sometimes chasing small birds as well as other birdwing species. The flight is usually high in the rainforest canopy, but both sexes descend to within a few meters of the ground while feeding or laying eggs.

== Threats and conservation ==
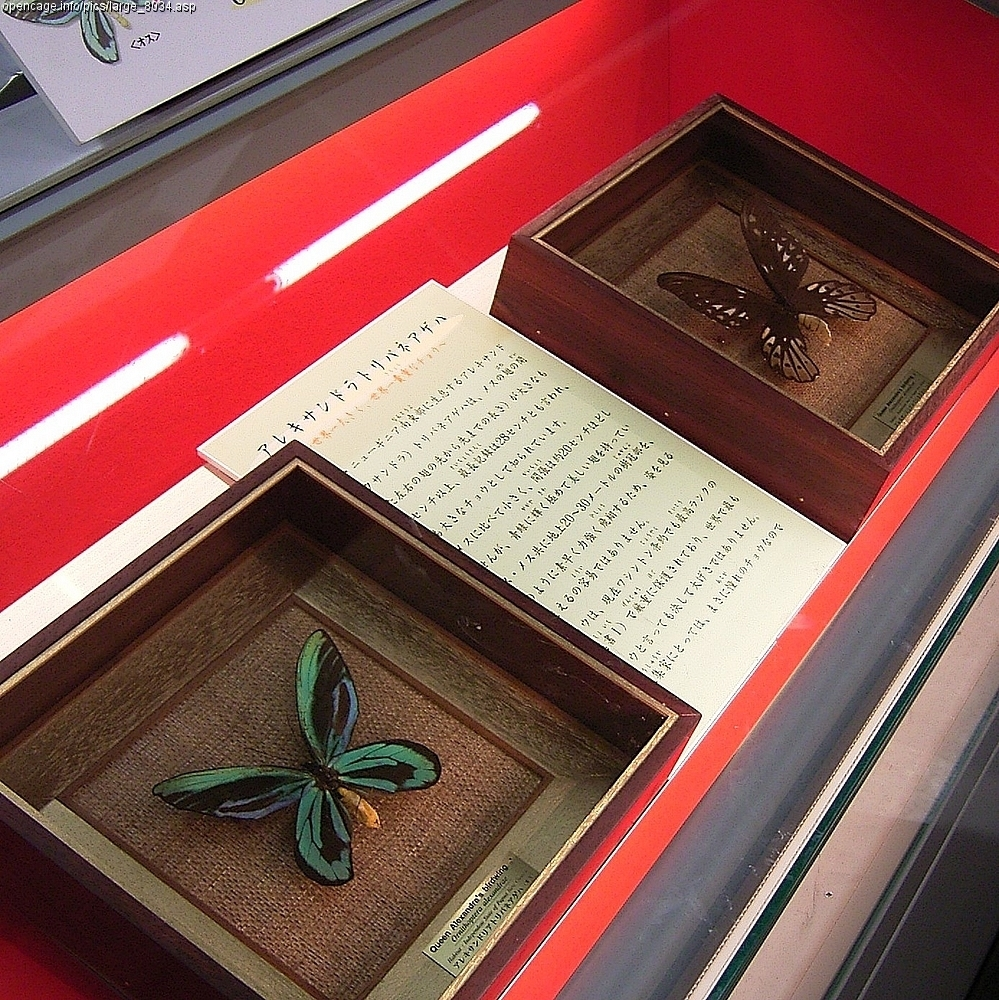
Raising the flagship profile with mounted specimens, collected or bred when the insect was not endangered.

The Queen Alexandra's birdwing is considered endangered by the IUCN, being restricted to approximately 100 km^{2} (40 mi^{2}) of coastal rainforest near Popondetta, Oro Province, Papua New Guinea. It is nonetheless abundant locally and requires old growth rainforest for its long-term survival. The major threat for this species is habitat destruction for oil palm plantations. However, the eruption of nearby Mount Lamington in the 1950s destroyed a very large area of this species' former habitat and is a key reason for its current rarity.

The species is also highly prized by collectors, and because of its rarity, this butterfly fetches a very high price on the black market, reportedly US$8,500-10,000 in the United States in 2007. In 2001, renowned Canadian researcher Gilles Deslisle was fined CA$50,000 for illegally importing six specimens of Queen Alexandra's birdwings. In 2007, "global butterfly smuggler" Hisayoshi Kojima pleaded guilty to 17 charges after selling a number of endangered butterflies, including a pair of Queen Alexandra's birdwings priced at US$8,500, to a special agent with the U.S. Fish and Wildlife Service.

Early collectors, frustrated by the height at which adults fly during the day, often used small shotguns to down specimens, but because collectors demand high quality specimens for their collections, most specimens are reared from larvae or pupae.

Although collectors are often implicated with the decline of this species, habitat destruction is the main threat.

The species is listed on Appendix I of CITES, meaning that international commercial trade is illegal. At the 2006 meeting of the CITES Animals Committee, some suggested it should be moved to Appendix II (which would allow restricted trade in the species), as the conservation benefits of sustainable management perhaps are higher than those of the trade ban.

== Gallery ==
Selection of museum specimens of Queen Alexandra's birdwing
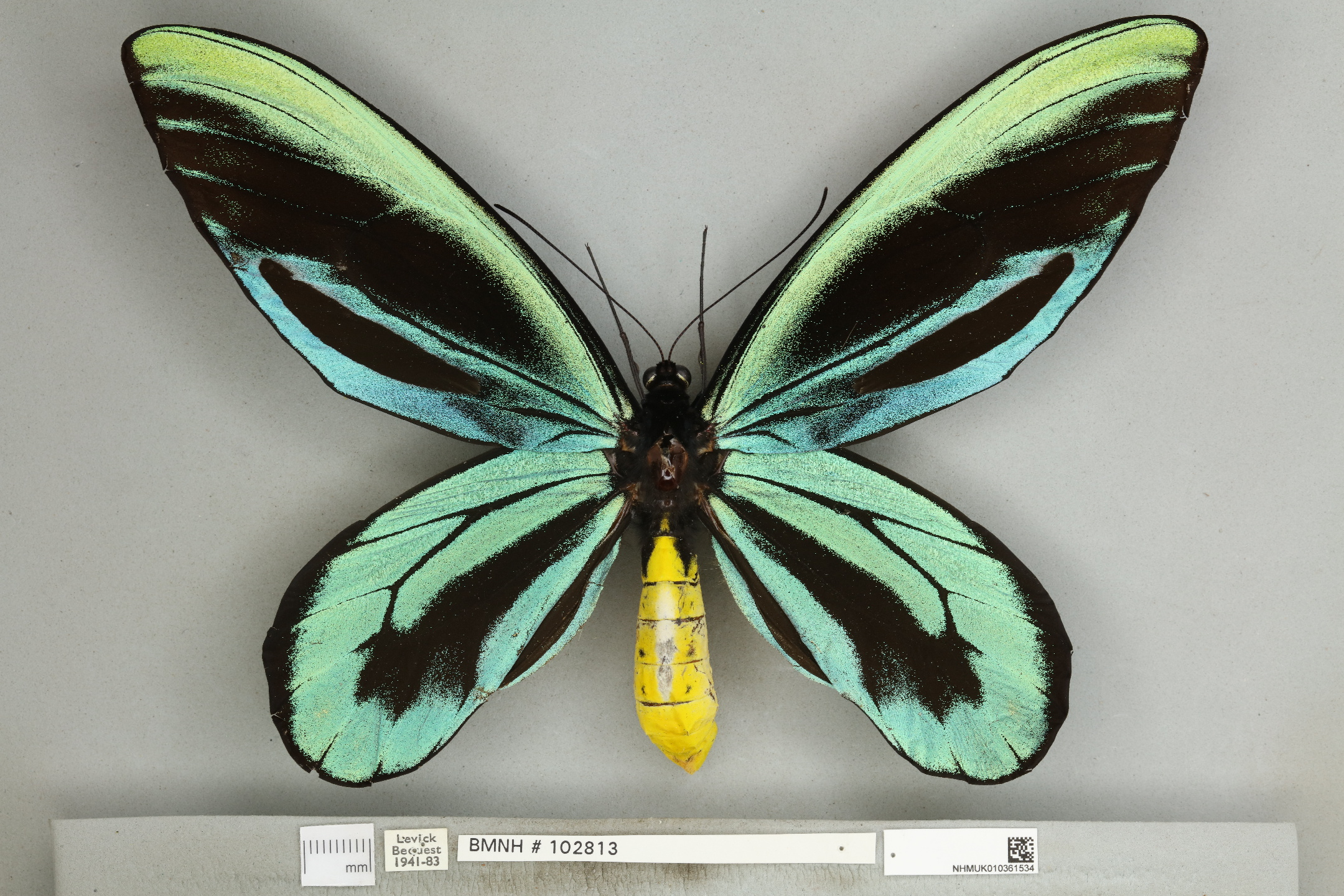
A dorsal/top down view of an adult male Queen Alexandra's birdwing.

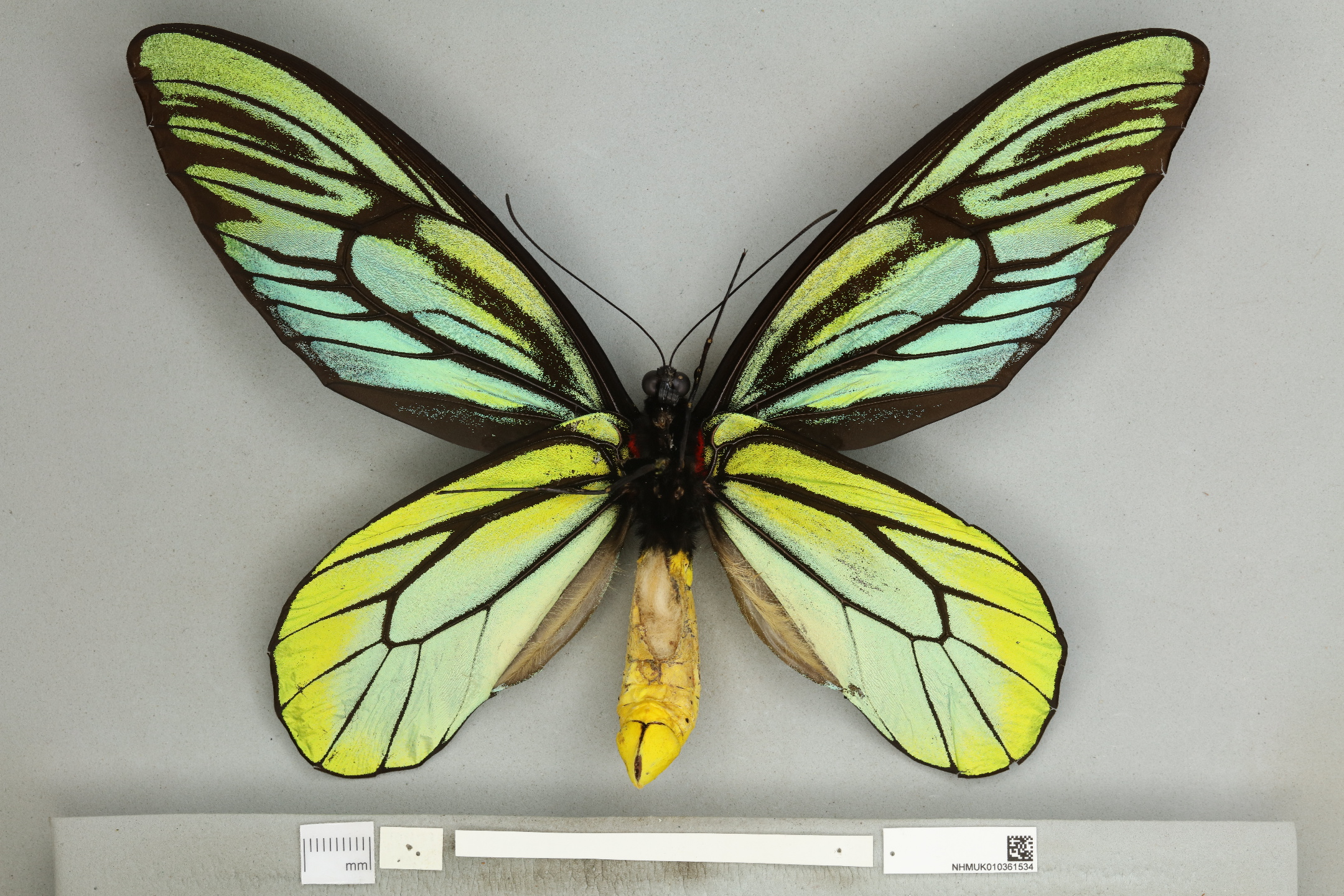
A ventral/underside view of an adult male Queen Alexandra's birdwing.

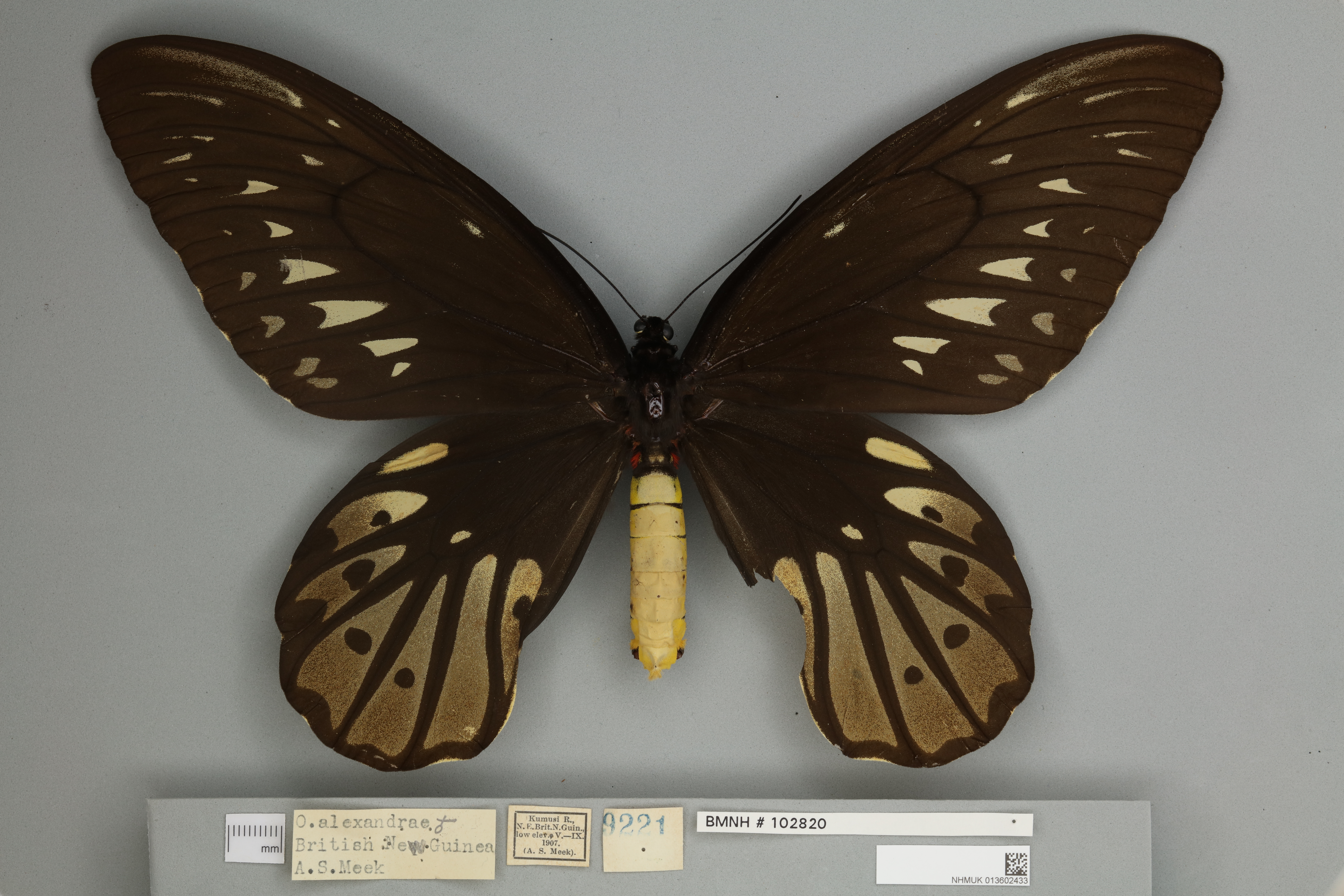
A dorsal/top down view of an adult female Queen Alexandra's birdwing.

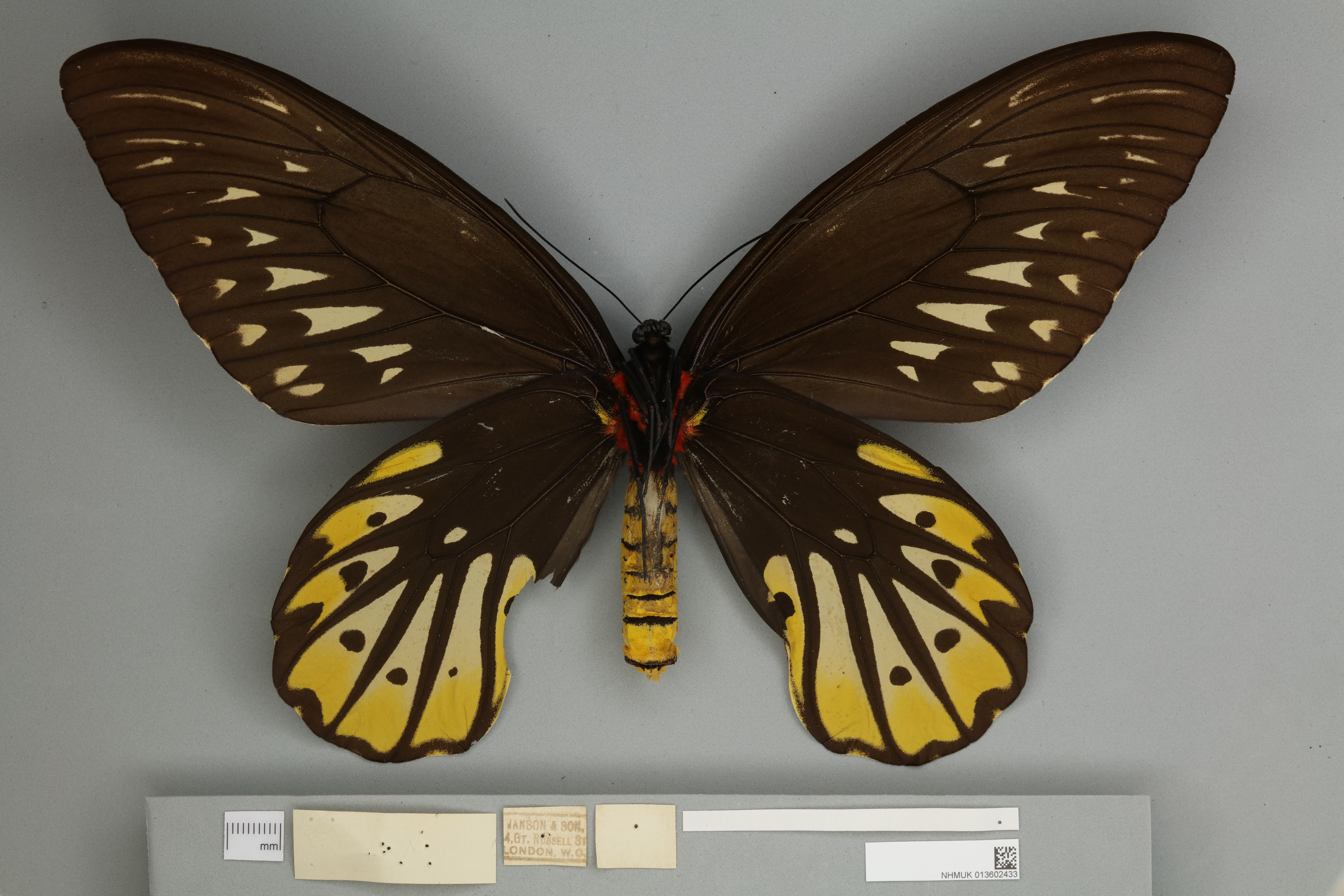
A ventral/underside view of an adult female Queen Alexandra's birdwing

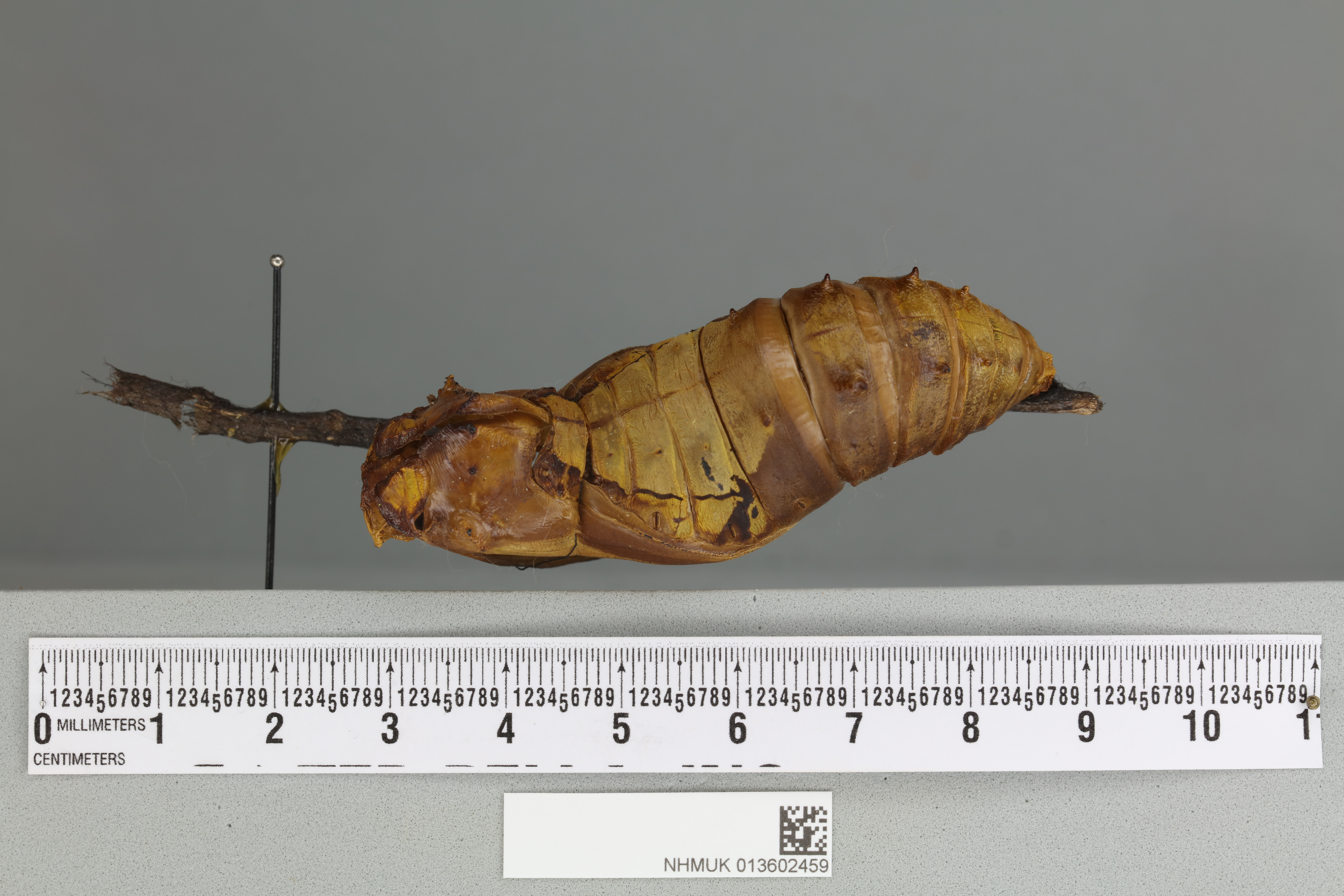
Side view of a pupa

== See also ==
- Conservation in Papua New Guinea
- Fauna of New Guinea
- Flagship species
- List of largest insects

== Other sources ==
- Parsons, Michael J., 1984 The Biology and Conservation of Ornithoptera alexandrae. In: The Biology of Butterflies, edited by Vane-Wright & Ackery. Symposia R. ent. Soc. Lond. 11, pp. [327-332]
- Parsons, Michael J., 1987 The Butterflies of Papua New Guinea.
- Parsons, Michael J. (1 June 1992). "The butterfly farming and trading industry in the Indo-Australian region and its role in tropical forest conservation". Tropical Lepidoptera. 3 (Supplement 1): 1–31.
- Parsons, M., 1999 The Butterflies of Papua New Guinea - Their Systematics and Biology. Academic Press, London
- Straatman, R. 1971 The life history of Ornithoptera alexandrae Rothschild Journal of the Lepidopterists' Society 1971 Volume 25:58-64.pdf
- D'Abrera, B. (1975) Birdwing Butterflies of the World. Country Life Books, London.
- Collins, N. Mark; Morris, Michael G. (1985). Threatened Swallowtail Butterflies of the World: The IUCN Red Data Book. Gland & Cambridge: IUCN. ISBN 978-2-88032-603-6 – via Biodiversity Heritage Library.
- Haugum, J. & Low, A.M. 1978–1985. A Monograph of the Birdwing Butterflies. 2 volumes. Scandinavian Press, Klampenborg; 663 pp.
- Deslisle, G. (2004) A taxonomic revision of the "birdwing butterflies of paradise", genus Ornithoptera based on the adult morphology (Lepidoptera, Papilionidae). Lambillionea, 104 (4): 1 - 151.
