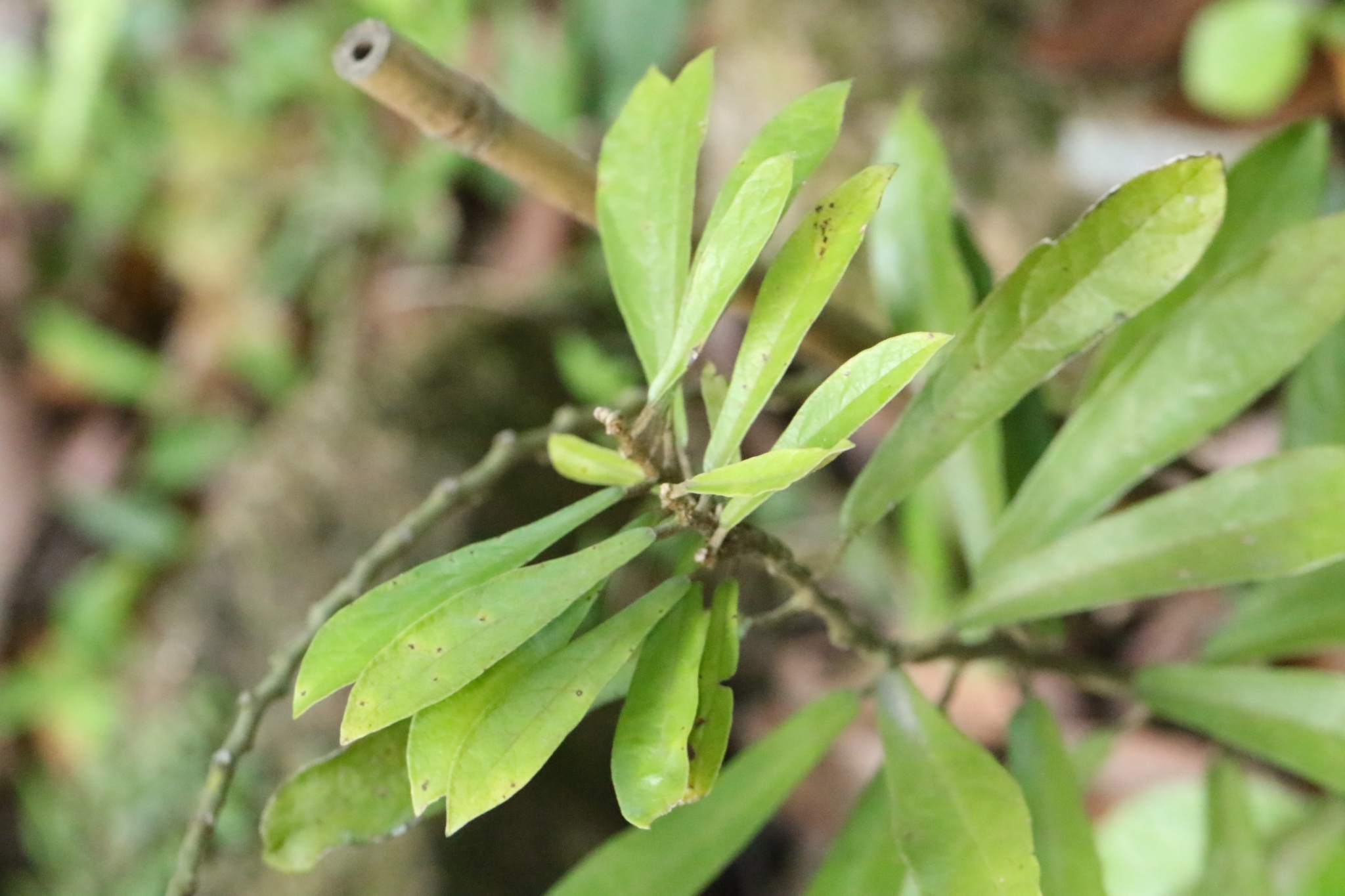

Conservation status
- Vulnerable (IUCN 3.1)

Scientific classification
- Kingdom: Plantae
- Clade: Tracheophytes
- Clade: Angiosperms
- Clade: Magnoliids
- Order: Piperales
- Family: Aristolochiaceae
- Genus: Aristolochia
- Species: A. thwaitesii

Binomial name
- Aristolochia thwaitesii Hook.

Synonyms
- Siphisia thwaitesii (Hook.) Klotzsch; Isotrema thwaitesii (Hook.) X.X.Zhu, S.Liao & J.S.Ma

= Aristolochia thwaitesii =

Species of plant

Aristolochia thwaitesii, also known as hai bian ma dou ling (Chinese: 海边马兜铃), is a species of plant in the family Aristolochiaceae. It is endemic to China.

== Distribution and habitat ==
A. thwaitesii is known only from Hong Kong and Zuhai in Guangdong province, China. It grows in bamboo forests, thickets, rocky crevices, and on mountain slopes.

== Description ==
A. thwaitesii is an upright subshrub with hairy stems. The leathery leaves are spatulate to oblong-oblanceolate, measuring 10–15 cm (3.9–5.9 in) by 2.5–3 cm (0.98–1.18 in). The undersides of the leaves are densely covered with brown hairs, while the upper surface is hairless. The inflorescence is a hairy raceme that emerges from the base of the plant and bears three to seven flowers. The flowers are curved tubes, yellow-green in colour and densely covered with brown hairs. The fruit is a dehiscent capsule measuring 3–5 cm (1.2–2.0 in) by 2–2.5 cm (0.79–0.98 in).

== Ecology ==
A. thwaitesii is known to flower from April to May and to bear fruit from August to September.
