= Aristolochia forrestiana =

Scientific classification
- Kingdom: Plantae
- Clade: Embryophytes
- Clade: Tracheophytes
- Clade: Spermatophytes
- Clade: Angiosperms
- Clade: Magnoliids
- Order: Piperales
- Family: Aristolochiaceae
- Genus: Aristolochia
- Species: A. forrestiana

Binomial name
- Aristolochia forrestiana J. S. Ma, 1989

Species of flowering plant

Aristolochia forrestiana is a species in the genus Aristolochia of the family Aristolochiaceae. It is endemic for China. The native range is Yunnan province. It is synonymous with Isotrema forrestianum.
