= Aristolochia hyperxantha =

Scientific classification
- Kingdom: Plantae
- Clade: Tracheophytes
- Clade: Angiosperms
- Clade: Magnoliids
- Order: Piperales
- Family: Aristolochiaceae
- Genus: Aristolochia
- Species: A. hyperxantha

Binomial name
- Aristolochia hyperxantha X. X. Zhu and J. S. Ma, 2017

Species of vine

Aristolochia hyperxantha is a species in the Aristolochiaceae plant family which is endemic to southeast China. The species was published by Xin Xin Zhu and Ma Jinshuang in 2018. It is synonymous with Isotrema hyperxanthum.
