= Aristolochia zhongdianensis =

Scientific classification
- Kingdom: Plantae
- Clade: Embryophytes
- Clade: Tracheophytes
- Clade: Spermatophytes
- Clade: Angiosperms
- Clade: Magnoliids
- Order: Piperales
- Family: Aristolochiaceae
- Genus: Aristolochia
- Species: A. zhongdianensis

Binomial name
- Aristolochia zhongdianensis J. S. Ma, 1989

Species of flowering plant

Aristolochia zhongdianensis is a species in the genus Aristolochia of the family Aristolochiaceae. The species epithet "zhongdianensis" means "from Zhongdian, Yunnan (now Shangri-La City)". It is endemic for China. Distributed in Yunnan and Sichuan provinces in mainland China.
