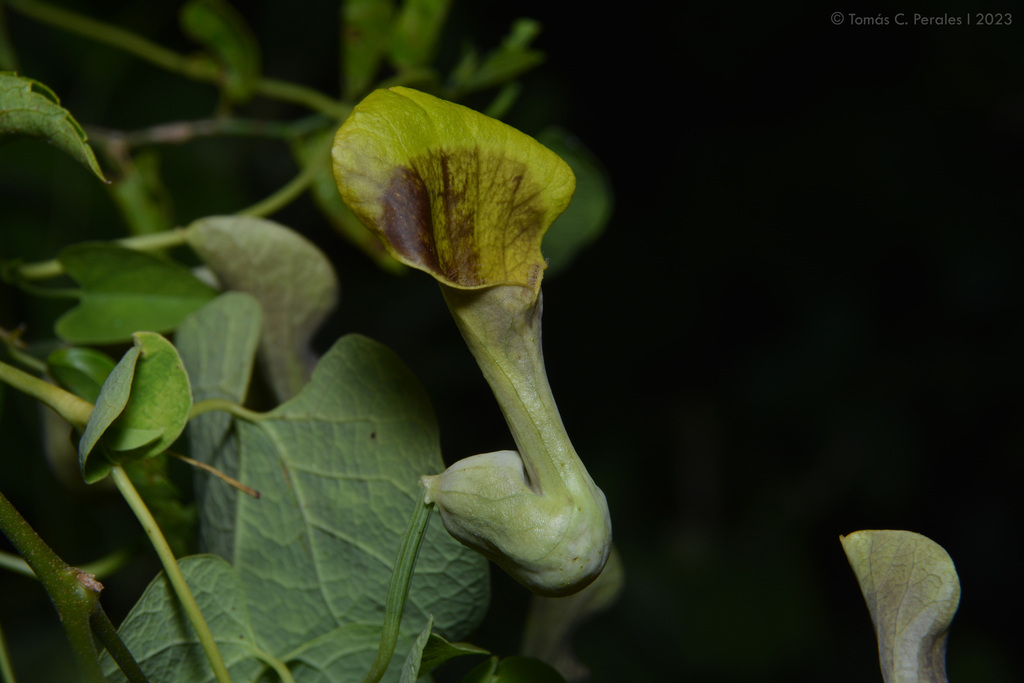

Scientific classification
- Kingdom: Plantae
- Clade: Tracheophytes
- Clade: Angiosperms
- Clade: Magnoliids
- Order: Piperales
- Family: Aristolochiaceae
- Genus: Aristolochia
- Species: A. argentina

Binomial name
- Aristolochia argentina Griseb.

Synonyms
- Aristolochia parviflora Griseb.; Aristolochia glaberrima Hassl.

= Aristolochia argentina =

Species of plant

Aristolochia argentina is a herbaceous plant in the family Aristolochiaceae. It is native to northern Argentina, Paraguay, and Bolivia.

== Description ==
The flowers of A. argentina are zygomorphic. The perianth is a single whorl made up of three fused together green tepals with purple or brown venation. The utricle, tube, and limb are distinguishable, like most other species in this genus. The length of the flower varies between 31-46 millimeters.

== Uses ==
It has been commonly used as there is essential oils from the leaves and can be used as a medicine. Commonly known in Spanish as charrúa, the medicine was found by the GC/MS by hydrodistillation.

The roots of the plant have been used as folk medicine to help with colitis, diarrhoea and hemorrhoids. A study used Aristolochia argentina lyophilized aqueous extract (AALE) and studied the antidiarrhoeal effects on rats and mice. It found that AALE inhibited intestinal motility and enteropooling property, thus having antidiarrhoeal effects.

== Distribution and habitat ==
It was most commonly found in the months of January and February. Around 80% of the time it was found, it was found in Argentina.

== Ecology ==
The flowers of Aristolochia argentina attract scuttle fly pollinators (genus Megaselia). The perianth is made to be a trap for the insects. It produces an odor that mimics some natural processes of the flies. The flies get trapped in there for 24 hours, all while making contact with the flowers sexual organs. After leaving, they can get caught later.

A 2016 study studied the foraging changes of Acromyrmex lundi after being exposed to Aristolochia argentina extract. It was found that the 1% extract had no impact on Acromyrmex lundi, but the 5% dose caused significant changes to the foraging habits of the ant. The 5% dose had a repellency index of above 95%.
