= Aristolochia clusii =

Scientific classification
- Kingdom: Plantae
- Clade: Embryophytes
- Clade: Tracheophytes
- Clade: Angiosperms
- Clade: Magnoliids
- Order: Piperales
- Family: Aristolochiaceae
- Genus: Aristolochia
- Species: A. clusii

Binomial name
- Aristolochia clusii Lojac.

Species of plant

Aristolochia clusii is a species of plants in the family Aristolochiaceae.

== Sources ==
This article incorporates text from a free content work. Licensed under CC0 (license statement/permission). Text taken from Aristolochia clusii. Encyclopedia of Life.
