= Aristolochia chalmersii =

Scientific classification
- Kingdom: Plantae
- Clade: Tracheophytes
- Clade: Angiosperms
- Clade: Magnoliids
- Order: Piperales
- Family: Aristolochiaceae
- Genus: Aristolochia
- Species: A. chalmersii

Binomial name
- Aristolochia chalmersii O.C.Schmidt

Synonyms
- Aristolochia sp. (Mt White) (Jones & Gray, 1988)

Species of plant

Aristolochia chalmersii is a slender, rainforest vine species native to north-eastern Queensland and CYP in Australia. It is a recorded host plant for the troidine butterfly Cressida cressida
