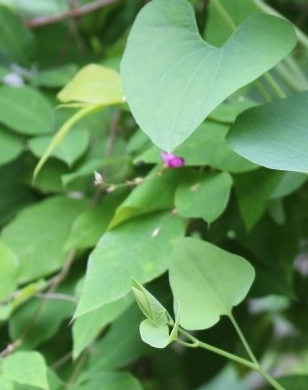

Scientific classification
- Kingdom: Plantae
- Clade: Embryophytes
- Clade: Tracheophytes
- Clade: Spermatophytes
- Clade: Angiosperms
- Clade: Magnoliids
- Order: Piperales
- Family: Aristolochiaceae
- Genus: Aristolochia
- Species: A. contorta

Binomial name
- Aristolochia contorta Bunge

= Aristolochia contorta =

Species of shrub

Aristolochia contorta, commonly known as northern pipevine, also known as birthwort, is a climbing perennial shrub.

== Ecology ==
Aristolochia contorta is a perennial herbaceous plant with stout elongated rhizomes that grows on the edges of the mountains, fields or forests in Korea, Japan, and eastern China. It is rarely found in open fields along the edge of the forests. It grows well in sunny places or slightly or fully shaded places with well-drained soil, and grows up to 1.5 metres (4 ft 11 in).

=== Stem ===
Its glabrous stems grow up to 1 metre (3 ft 3 in)-1.5 metres (4 ft 11 in). The color of the new sprouts is dark purple, and eventually turns green or even slightly white. It grows up winding around other objects.

=== Leaves ===
Its heart-shaped or egg-shaped leaves sprout unevenly and the color is white tinged with green. The length extends from 4 centimetres (1.6 in) - 10 centimetres (3.9 in), and the width extends from 3.5 centimetres (1.4 in)-8 centimetres (3.1 in). The edges are dull and the petioles are long.

=== Flower ===
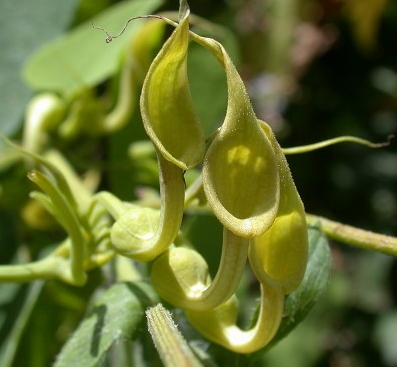
Flowers of Aristolochia contorta

Green and purple tube shaped flowers bloom during July to August, coming out from the axils. Calyx tubes are glabrous and widen to the bottom, and narrowing towards the top they open widely like horns. One side of the lobes lengthen with sharp edges, and the length of the peduncles are 1 centimetre (0.39 in) - 4 centimetres (1.6 in). The flowers do not have floral leaves and consist of 6 stamens and 6 pistils joined as a whole. The ovaries are very thin, long and fragile.

=== Fruit ===
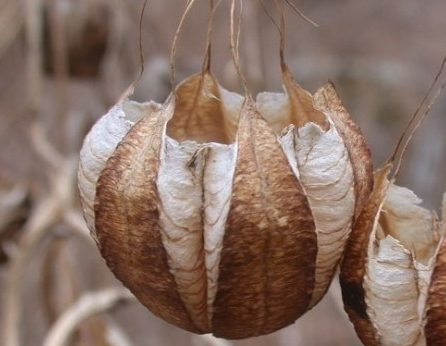
Fruits of Aristolochia contorta

The globular shaped fruits bore on October, has 6 holes containing many seeds. The lower part of the fruits divide, each of them hanging on to the peduncles, splitting like tiny strands, and shape like parachutes.

== Chemical constituents ==
Aristolochia contorta contains the carcinogenic chemical compounds aristolochic acid and derivatives. The plant also contains aristolactam derivatives and N-glycosides: 8-desmethoxyaristolactam, 6-hydroxy-8-desmethoxyaristolactam N-b-d-glucopyranoside and oxoaporphines. A. contarta is believed to be antimicrobial, hallucinogenic, immunostimulating, antitumour, and hypotensive.

== Traditional medicine ==
In Korean traditional prescription, their fruits and roots are used medicinally. The fruits are used for treating phlegm, asthma, hemorrhoids and high blood pressure, and the roots for enteritis, boils, and abdominal inflation.

== Breeding method ==
The seeds gathered in October are most productive, and the roots of early spring or fall can be divided for planting.

== Care ==
Grows best planted in pots and gardens, and planted on slopes with well-drained soil. The plants must be watered two to three days apart.

== Consumption ==
After the peeled fruits roasted on high heat are ground into powder, 4 grams (0.14 oz) of it must be boiled in 200 millilitres (7.0 imp fl oz; 6.8 US fl oz) of water.
