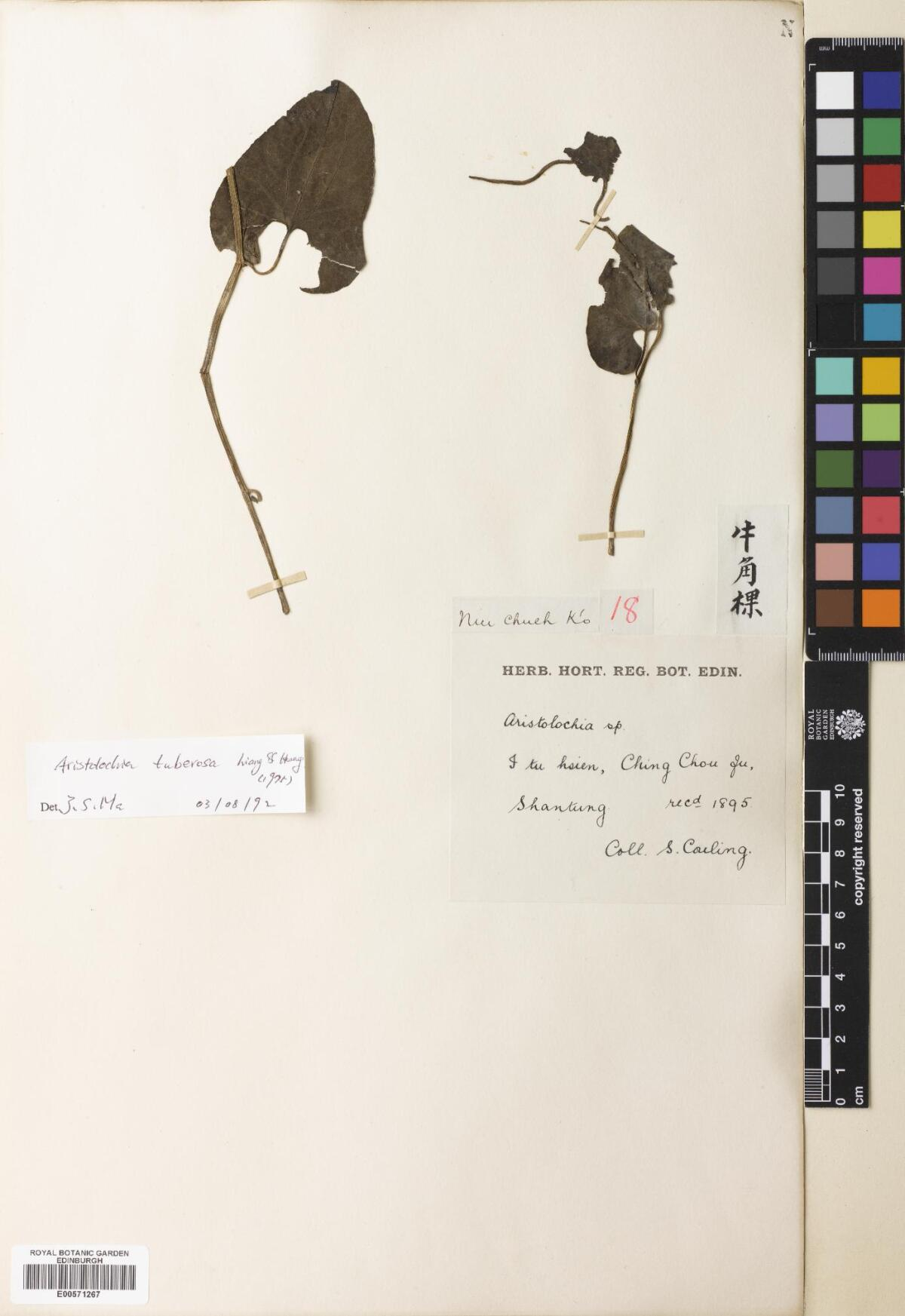
- Herbarium pressing of Aristolochia tuberosa, collected in 1895.

Conservation status
- Endangered (IUCN 3.1)

Scientific classification
- Kingdom: Plantae
- Clade: Embryophytes
- Clade: Tracheophytes
- Clade: Spermatophytes
- Clade: Angiosperms
- Clade: Magnoliids
- Order: Piperales
- Family: Aristolochiaceae
- Genus: Aristolochia
- Species: A. tuberosa

Binomial name
- Aristolochia tuberosa C.F.Liang & S.M.Hwang

Synonyms
- Aristolochia cinnabarina C.Y.Cheng & J.L.Wu

= Aristolochia tuberosa =

Species of vine

Aristolochia tuberosa, commonly known as bei she sheng (背蛇生), is a species of herbaceous plant in the family Aristolochiaceae that is native to China and Vietnam.

== Description ==
It is a climbing perennial herb with tuberous roots of fusiform or spherical structure. Its leaves are cordate and hairless, typically 8-14 × 5-11 cm, with palmate venation. The stems are angled and hairless, and the petioles are 7-10 cm in length. The male and female reproductive structures are fused into a single gynostemium, and it produces ovoid seeds measuring around 4 × 3 mm. One to three flowers form on each axil, with blooming occurring from November to April and fruiting from June to October.

== Taxonomy ==
Aristolochia tuberosa was first described in 1975 by Chou-Fen Liang and Shu-Mei Hwang within the academic journal Acta Phytotaxonomica Sinica. It was noted as being physically comparable to Aristolochia tubiflora.

== Distribution and habitat ==
It occurs in several provinces across southwestern and south-central China, including Guangxi, Guizhou, Hubei, Hunan, Sichuan, and Yunnan. It is also native to Vietnam.

The plant is known to grow in mountainous limestone areas, as well as in thickets and valleys, at elevations ranging from 100-1600 meters.

== Toxicity ==
Plants within the genus Aristolochia, such as Aristolochia tuberosa, contain the compound aristolochic acid. When ingested, this compound has been shown to cause kidney damage and disease, and is associated with increased risk of bladder cancer. Increased regulatory warnings over time have led to the banning or regulation of aristolochic acid-containing products in most countries. However, cases of toxicity are still reported, particularly in parts of Asia and the Balkans.

== Medicinal uses ==
In traditional medicine, the tuber of Aristolochia tuberosa, also known as zhu sha lian (珠砂莲), is used for general medicinal treatments and for healing of snake bites.
