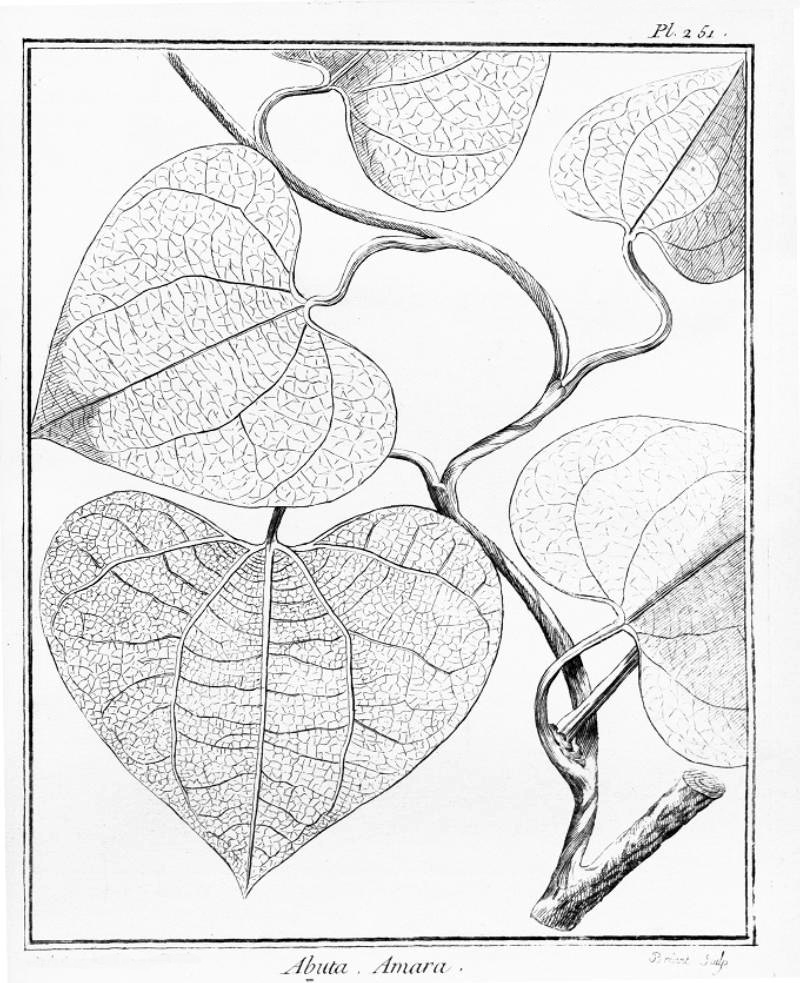

Scientific classification
- Kingdom: Plantae
- Clade: Tracheophytes
- Clade: Angiosperms
- Clade: Magnoliids
- Order: Piperales
- Family: Aristolochiaceae
- Genus: Aristolochia
- Species: A. amara

Binomial name
- Aristolochia amara (Aubl.) Poncy

Synonyms
- Abuta amara Aubl.; Menispermum amarum (Aubl.) Willd.

= Aristolochia amara =

Species of flowering plant

Aristolochia amara is a species of plant in the family Aristolochiaceae. It is a climber endemic to French Guiana.
