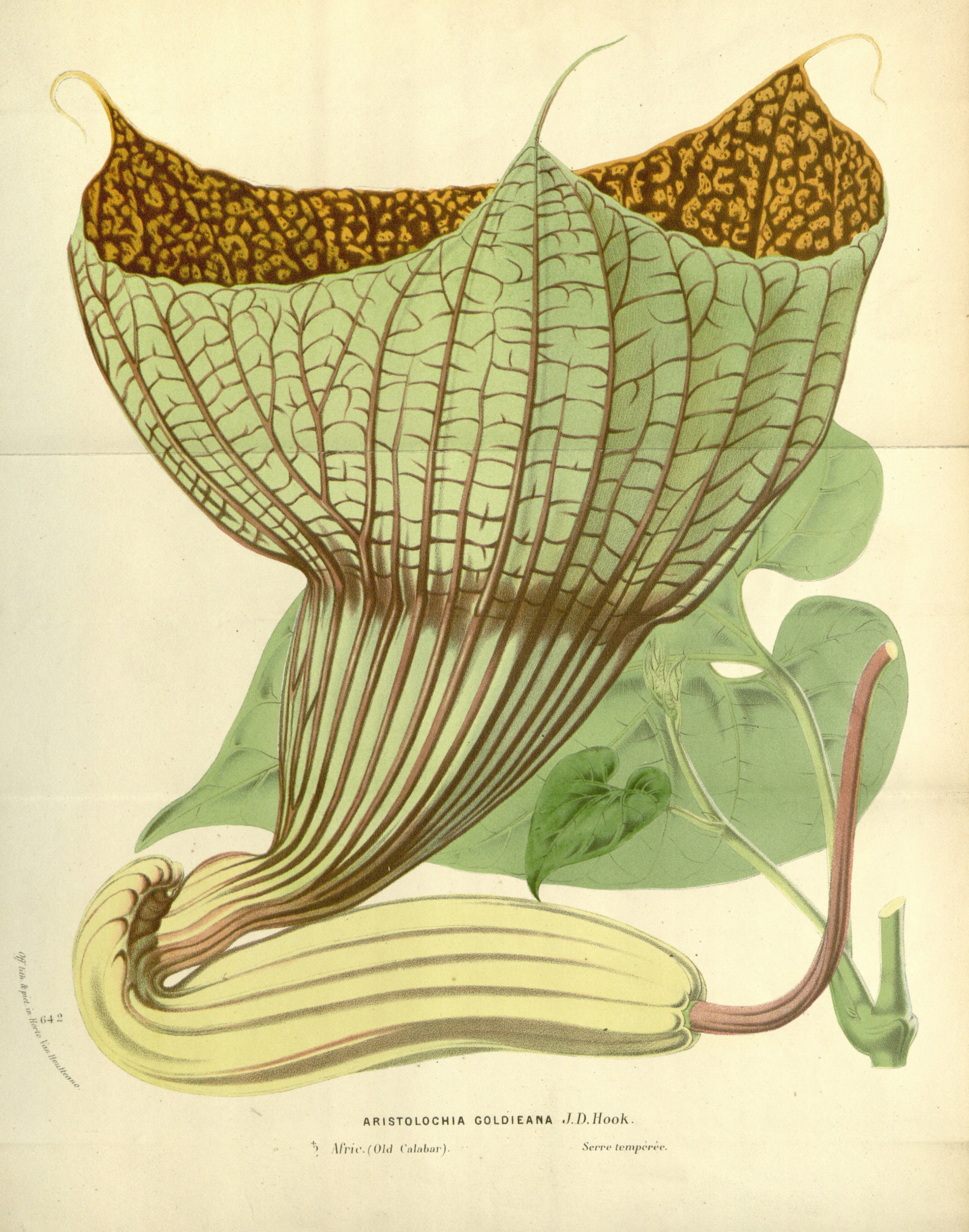

Conservation status
- Vulnerable (IUCN 3.1)

Scientific classification
- Kingdom: Plantae
- Clade: Tracheophytes
- Clade: Angiosperms
- Clade: Magnoliids
- Order: Piperales
- Family: Aristolochiaceae
- Genus: Aristolochia
- Species: A. goldieana

Binomial name
- Aristolochia goldieana (Hook.f.) Hutch. & Dalz.

Synonyms
- Pararistolochia goldieana (Hook.f.) Hutch. & Dalziel

= Aristolochia goldieana =

Species of flowering plant

Aristolochia goldieana is a species of plant in the family Aristolochiaceae. It is found in Benin, Cameroon, Ghana, Guinea, Guinea-Bissau, the Gulf of Guinea Islands, Ivory Coast, Liberia, Nigeria, and Sierra Leone. Its natural habitat is subtropical or tropical moist lowland forests. It is threatened by habitat loss.
