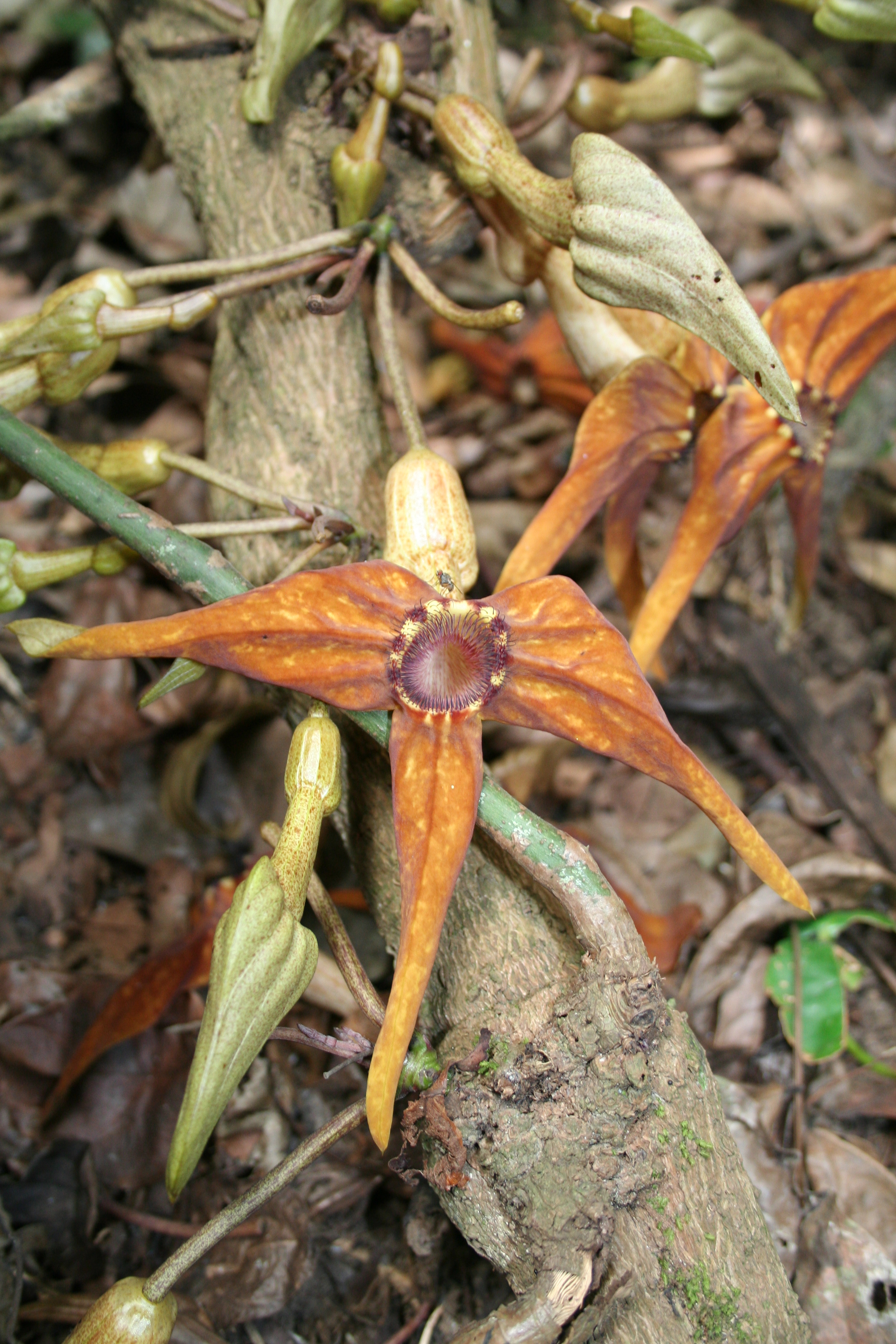

Scientific classification
- Kingdom: Plantae
- Clade: Tracheophytes
- Clade: Angiosperms
- Clade: Magnoliids
- Order: Piperales
- Family: Aristolochiaceae
- Genus: Aristolochia
- Species: A. macrocarpa

Binomial name
- Aristolochia macrocarpa Duch.

Synonyms
- Pararistolochia macrocarpa (Duch.) Poncy; Aristolochia flos-avis A.Chev.; Aristolochia soyauxiana Oliv.; Aristolochia staudtii Engl.; Aristolochia tessmannii Engl.; Aristolochia tribrachiata S.Moore; Pararistolochia flos-avis (A.Chev.) Hutch. & Dalziel; Pararistolochia macrocarpa var. soyauxiana (Oliv.) Poncy; Pararistolochia soyauxiana (Oliv.) Hutch. & Dalziel; Pararistolochia staudtii (Engl.) Hutch. & Dalziel; Pararistolochia tribrachiata (S.Moore) Hutch. & Dalziel

= Aristolochia macrocarpa =

Species of flowering plant

Aristolochia macrocarpa, synonym Pararistolochia macrocarpa, is a species of flowering plant in the family Aristolochiaceae native to west and west-central tropical Africa.

== Distribution ==
Aristolochia macrocarpa is native to west tropical Africa (Ghana, Ivory Coast, Liberia, Nigeria, and Sierra Leone) and to west-central tropical Africa (Cabinda Province, Cameroon, the Central African Republic, the Republic of the Congo, Equatorial Guinea, Gabon, and the Democratic Republic of the Congo).
