= Aristolochia ceropegioides =

Conservation status
- Vulnerable (IUCN 3.1)

Scientific classification
- Kingdom: Plantae
- Clade: Tracheophytes
- Clade: Angiosperms
- Clade: Magnoliids
- Order: Piperales
- Family: Aristolochiaceae
- Genus: Aristolochia
- Species: A. ceropegioides

Binomial name
- Aristolochia ceropegioides S.Moore

Synonyms
- Pararistolochia ceropegioides (S.Moore) Hutch. & Dalziel

Species of flowering plant

Aristolochia ceropegioides, synonym Pararistolochia ceropegioides, is a plant species of family Aristolochiaceae. It is found in Cameroon and Gabon. Its natural habitats are subtropical or tropical dry forests and subtropical or tropical moist lowland forests. It is threatened by habitat loss.
