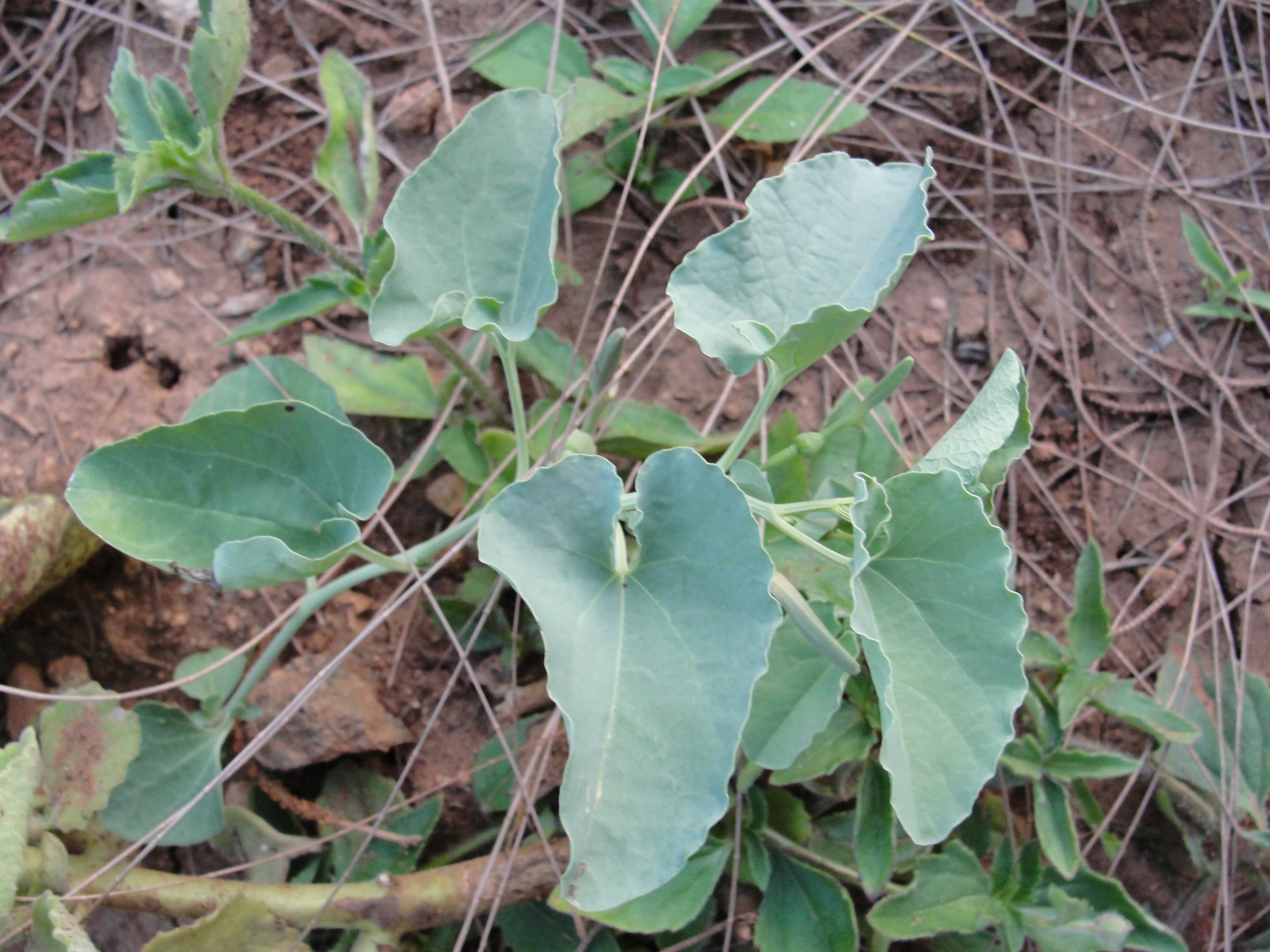

Scientific classification
- Kingdom: Plantae
- Clade: Tracheophytes
- Clade: Angiosperms
- Clade: Magnoliids
- Order: Piperales
- Family: Aristolochiaceae
- Genus: Aristolochia
- Species: A. bracteolata

Binomial name
- Aristolochia bracteolata Lam.

Synonyms
- Aristolochia abyssinica Klotzch; Aristolochia bracteata Retz.; Aristolochia crenata Ehreb. ex Duch; Aristolochia kotschyi Hoscht. ex A.rich; Aristolochia mauritiana Pers.; Einomeia bracteata (Retz.) Raf

= Aristolochia bracteolata =

Species of vine

Aristolochia bracteolata also known as 'worm killer' in English due to its anthelminthic activity and trypanocidal effect, is a perennial herb growing from 10–60 cm tall. The plant is important in traditional medicine in Africa, India and the Middle East.

== Distribution and ecology ==
Aristolochia bracteolata grows in subsaharan regions from Mali to Somalia through to the Arabian peninsula and India. The plant grows at elevations of 50-740m above sea level and can be found on the banks of rivers, bushland, desert grasslands. It grows in sandy or lava soils.

== Description ==
Aristolochia bracteolata is a climbing or prostrate perennial herb with an unpleasant smell, stems 10–60 cm tall from an underground rhizome. The leaves are ovate 1.5–8 × 1.5–7 cm with a petiole 0.5–4.5 cm long. Flowers are dark purple, 0.5–5 cm tubular, with trumpet shaped mouth. Capsules are oblong-ellipsoid, 1.5–2.5 cm. Aristolochia bracteolata has been observed to have 2–3 flowers per leaf axil in Somalia, however outside Somalia the plant seems to have solitary flowers.

== Cultivation ==
Aristolochia bracteolata is usually gathered from the wild.

== Traditional medicine ==
Aristolochia bracteolata has been used in traditional medicine in Nigeria, India, and Ethiopia as an infusion of dried leaves to treat intestinal worms, skin itch, or insect bites.
