= Aristolochia schlechteri =

Scientific classification
- Kingdom: Plantae
- Clade: Tracheophytes
- Clade: Angiosperms
- Clade: Magnoliids
- Order: Piperales
- Family: Aristolochiaceae
- Genus: Aristolochia
- Species: A. schlechteri

Binomial name
- Aristolochia schlechteri Lauterb.

Synonyms
- Pararistolochia schlechteri (Lauterb.) Mich.J.Parsons

Species of vine

Aristolochia schlechteri, synonym Pararistolochia schlechteri, is a liana endemic to Papua New Guinea. It was first described by Carl Lauterbach in 1905. Although its distribution is supposedly restricted to the Northern Province, there have been two rare accounts of occurrences in the Madang and East Sepik Provinces.
