= Aristolochia preussii =

Conservation status
- Critically Endangered (IUCN 3.1)

Scientific classification
- Kingdom: Plantae
- Clade: Tracheophytes
- Clade: Angiosperms
- Clade: Magnoliids
- Order: Piperales
- Family: Aristolochiaceae
- Genus: Aristolochia
- Species: A. preussii

Binomial name
- Aristolochia preussii Engl.

Synonyms
- Pararistolochia preussii (Engl.) Hutch. & Dalziel

Species of flowering plant

Aristolochia preussii is a species of plant in the family Aristolochiaceae. It is native to Cameroon, Equatorial Guinea, Gabon, and Ivory Coast. Its natural habitat is subtropical or tropical dry forests. It was assessed as "critically endangered" and threatened by habitat loss in the 2000 IUCN Red List, where it is said to be native only to Cameroon., Plants of the World Online gives it a wider distribution.
