= Ma Jinshuang =

Chinese botanist (born 1955)

- 马金双
- Born: 1955 (age 70–71); Changling County, Jilin, China

Academic background
- Education: Northeast Forestry University (MS); Beijing Medical University (PhD)

Academic work
- Institutions: Beijing Normal University; Harvard University Herbaria; Brooklyn Botanic Garden; China National Botanical Garden

Ma Jinshuang (Note: Also written as Jinshuang Ma and Jin-shuang Ma) (Chinese: 马金双, born 1955) is a Chinese botanist who specializes in taxonomic literature, history of Chinese plants, and the conservation of rare and endangered species. He has been the research botanist and chief scientist at the China National Botanical Garden since 2020.

== Education and career ==
Ma was born in 1955 in Changling County, Jilin, China. He first studied at the Northeast Forestry University, where he earned a bachelor's degree in forestry in 1982, later obtaining a master's degree in Dendrology in 1985. He then went to Beijing Medical University (now the Peking University Health Science Center), where he completed his PhD in Plant taxonomy in 1987. He then joined the Department of Biology of Beijing Normal University as a lecturer in the same year, obtaining full-professorship in 1994.

From 1994 to 1995 he was concurrently director of the Scientific Research Office of Beijing Normal University.

In 1995 Ma went to the Harvard University Herbarium as a visiting scholar, in 2001, he became a researcher in plant taxonomy at the Brooklyn Botanic Garden in the United States.

He was appointed professor and chief scientist at the Shanghai Chenshan Plant Science Research Center, Chinese Academy of Sciences in the Shanghai Chenshan Botanical Garden between 2018 and 2020, he was then appointed as research botanist and Chief Scientist at the China National Botanical Garden in 2020.

=== Research and editorial roles ===
Ma's research interests include the taxonomy of specific plant groups like Aristolochiaceae (Aristolochia family), Celastraceae (Euonymus family), and Euphorbiaceae (Euphorbia family), as well as the natural history of the Metasequoia (dawn redwood). Additionally, He has made contributions to the study of invasive and naturalized floras in China and North America.

He has also played important roles in projects on the naturalization and invasive character of plant species in China. His taxonomic contributions includes revisions of plant genera such as Aristolochia, Euonymus, and Euphorbia.

Ma serves on the board of Plant Diversity at the Kunming Institute of Botany, Chinese Academy of Sciences since 2020.
