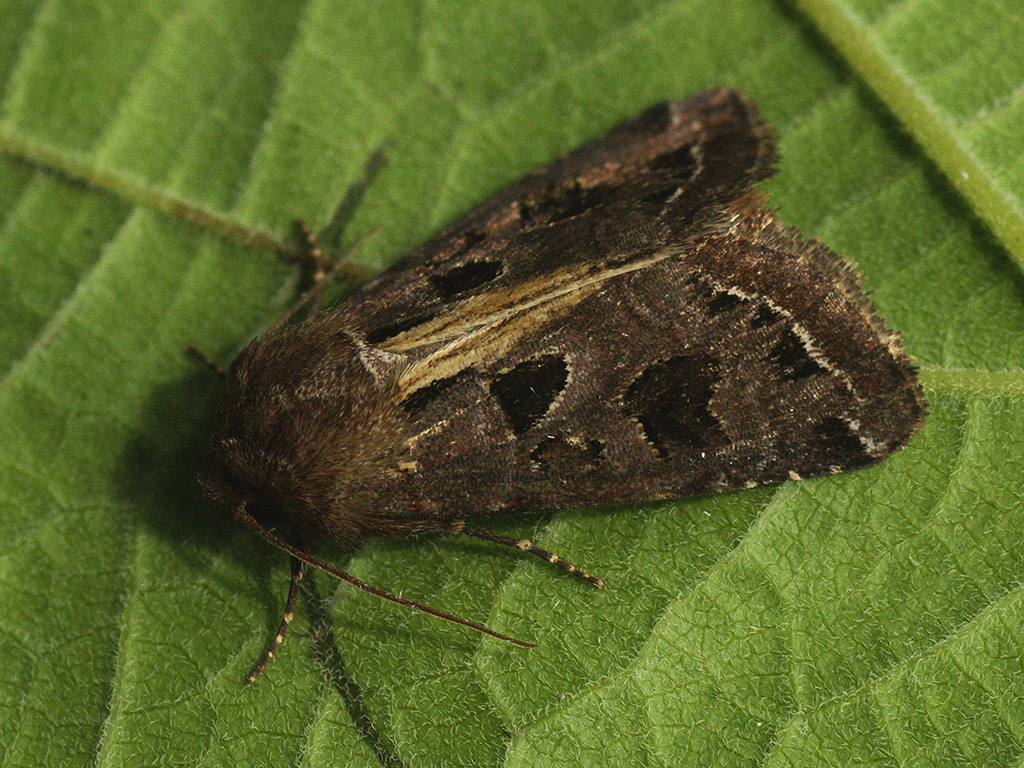
- Hyssia cavernosa

Scientific classification
- Domain: Eukaryota
- Kingdom: Animalia
- Phylum: Arthropoda
- Class: Insecta
- Order: Lepidoptera
- Superfamily: Noctuoidea
- Family: Noctuidae
- Genus: Hyssia
- Species: H. cavernosa

Binomial name
- Hyssia cavernosa (Eversmann, 1842)

= Hyssia cavernosa =

Species of moth

Hyssia cavernosa is a species of moth belonging to the family Noctuidae.

It is native to the Palearctic.

== Description ==
Warren states.H. cavernosa Ev. (= ornata H.-Sch.) (21 f). Forewing violet grey, suffused with fuscous; inner margin below vein 1 prominently yellowish white, a sharp-pointed black streak from the base below vein 1; lines vertical; stigmata large and conspicuous, deep olive brown; claviform bullet-shaped; orbicular round, black-edged, open at the top; reniform with dark centre; outer line minutely dentate, pale-edged, with 2 longer grey teeth along veins 3, 4 touching a subterminal line, which is white, preceded by double dark blotches on the folds and at costa, and an oblong grey blotch between veins 6 and 7; hindwing fuscous, with cell spot and terminal area darker. A South European species found in Italy, Switzerland, Hungary, Austria and S. E. Russia: extending from the Altai Mts. in W. Siberia to Ussuri in E. Siberia, and occurring in W. and E. Turkestan and Mongolia. The larva is green, thickest in the middle and tapering forward and backwards. It has a thin yellow or orange lateral line and two thin white dorsal lines that can be lined with blackish shadows.

== Biology ==
The larvae feed on Silene spp. and Aristolochia clematitis
