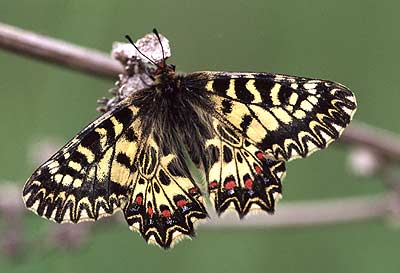
- Dorsal view
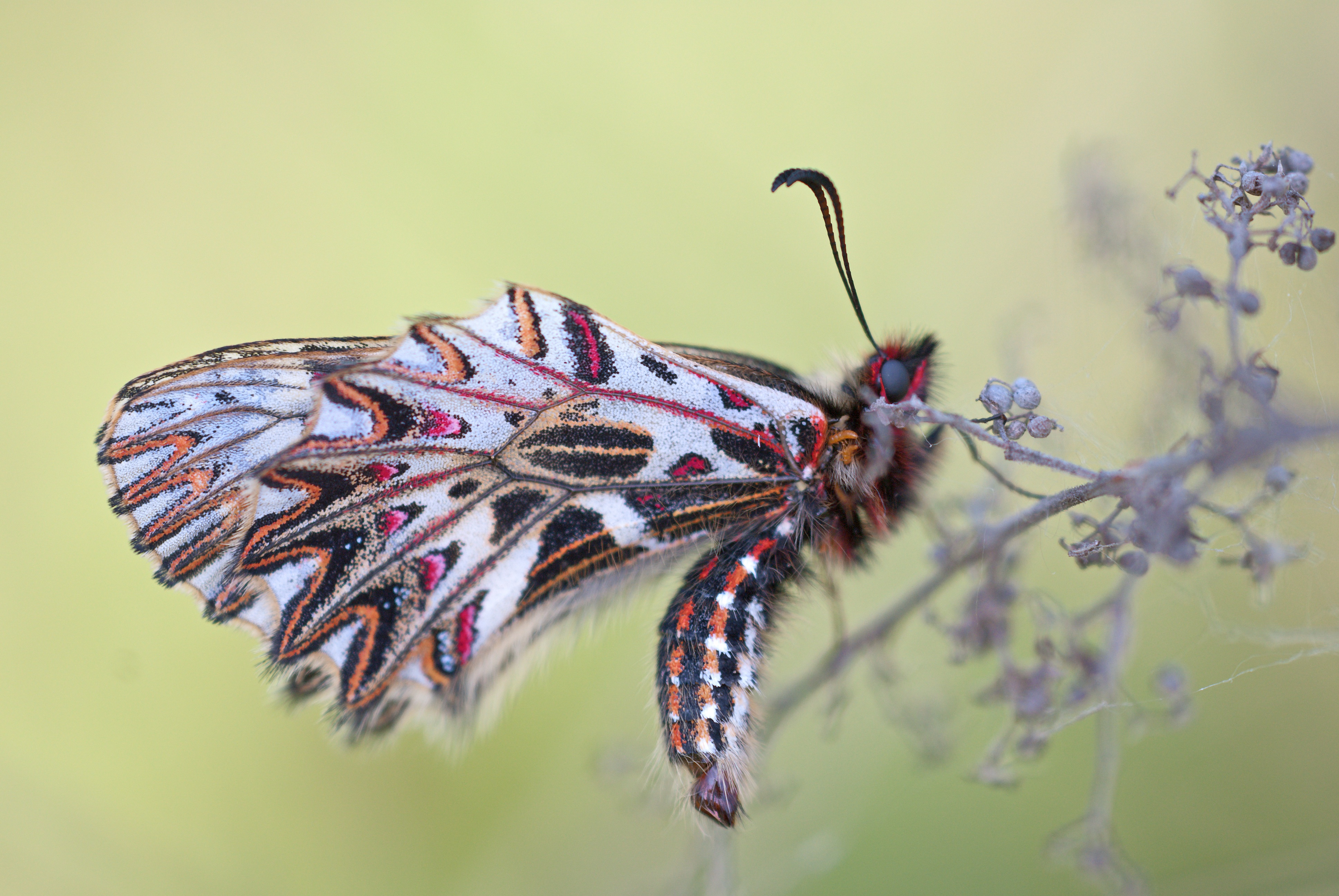
- Lateral view

Scientific classification
- Kingdom: Animalia
- Phylum: Arthropoda
- Class: Insecta
- Order: Lepidoptera
- Family: Papilionidae
- Genus: Zerynthia
- Species: Z. polyxena

Binomial name
- Zerynthia polyxena (Denis & Schiffermüller, 1775)

Synonyms
- Papilio cassandra Geyer, 1828; Papilio creusa Meigen, 1829; Papilio hypermnestra Scopoli, 1763; Papilio hypsipyle Schulze, 1776; Papilio hypsipyle Fabricus, 1777; Zerynthia polyxena D., 1775; Zerynthia polyxena polyxena

= Zerynthia polyxena =

Southern festoon

Species of butterfly

Zerynthia polyxena, the southern festoon, is a butterfly belonging to the butterfly family Papilionidae.

== Description ==
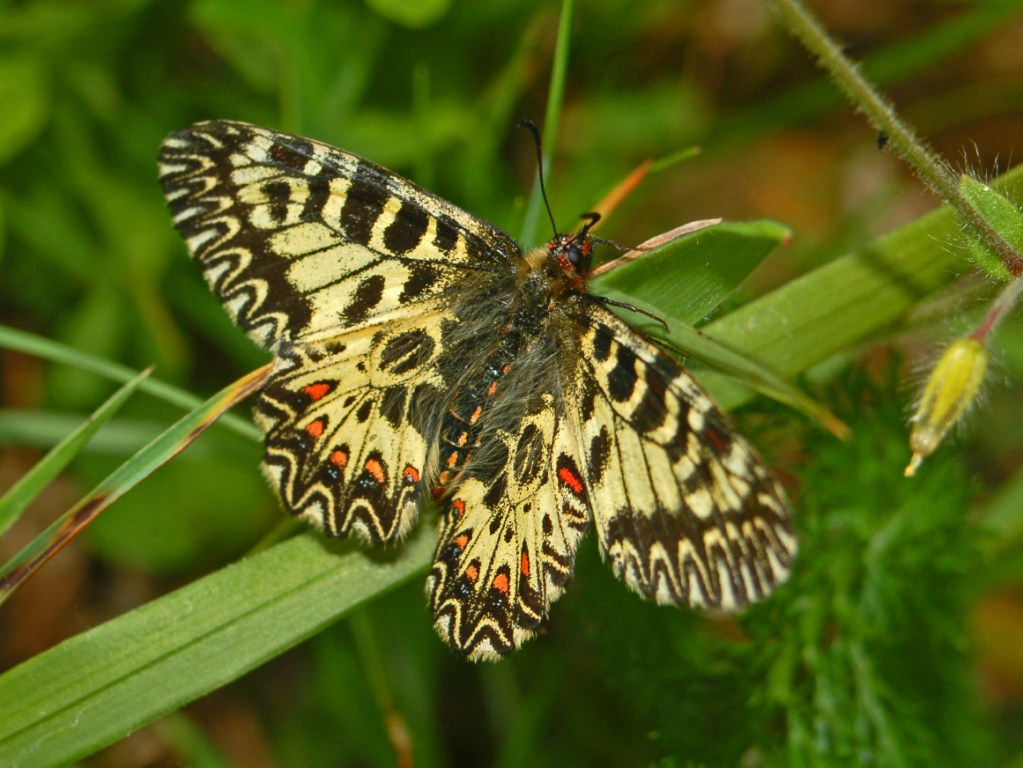
Dorsal view

The southern festoon can reach a wingspan of 46–52 mm. The females have slightly longer wings, usually lighter colored than males. The basic color of the wings is yellow, with a complicated pattern of several black bands and spots.

On the edges of the hindwings they have a black sinuous line with a series of blue and red warning spots to deter potential predators (aposematism). The body is dark brown and bears red patches on the sides of the abdomen.

This species is rather similar to, and can be confused only with, the Spanish festoon (Z. rumina). The differences are in the presence of blue on the hind wings of Z. polyxena and the relatively lower amount of red on its forewings compared with Z. rumina. The ranges of these two species overlap only in southeast France.

The caterpillars of Z. polyxena are up to 35 millimeters long. They are initially black, then they are yellowish with six rows of fleshy orange and black spikes all over the body.

== Description in Seitz ==
T. polyxena Schiff. & Den. (= hypermnestra Scop.hypsipyle Fabr.). Light yellow, with spots and dentate lines, the hindwing bearing red submarginal spots. South Europe, from Southern France to the Black Sea, and Asia Minor. — In ab. rumina Esp.). the black costal spots of the forewing bear red centres, also on the upperside, while usually such red dots are found only in some places of the underside. This form is not rare in some localities, for instance in the West of the Balcan Peninsula. — Specimens in which the black colour is extended are known as ab. cassandra Hb. (= demnosia Frr., creusa Meig.) (9f); the proportional extent of black is, however, individually very variable. Such melanotic specimens occur everywhere singly as aberrations, but are found as the only form in some localities, for instance Dalmatia. — ab. ochracea Stgr. (=polymnia Mill.) (9f) is the name of individuals in which the light yellow colour is replaced by a magnificent dark yellow. Also this form occurs everywhere among the ordinary form, but is in certain places especially plentiful. — ab. meta Meig. (= flavomaculata Schilde, rufescens Oberth., rumina, alba Esp) (9f), however, is everywhere a rare aberration, the red colour of the purple spots being replaced by dark yellow. — In ab. bella Neub. the third costal spot is reduced. — The full-grown larva reddish yellow r black-brown, with pointed setiferous tubercles; in May and June on Aristolochia, especially in moist and warm localities. The statement that the larva feeds also on Quercus ilex is doubtless occasioned by an error of identification. The pupa is very slender, being yellowish grey, marked with brown.

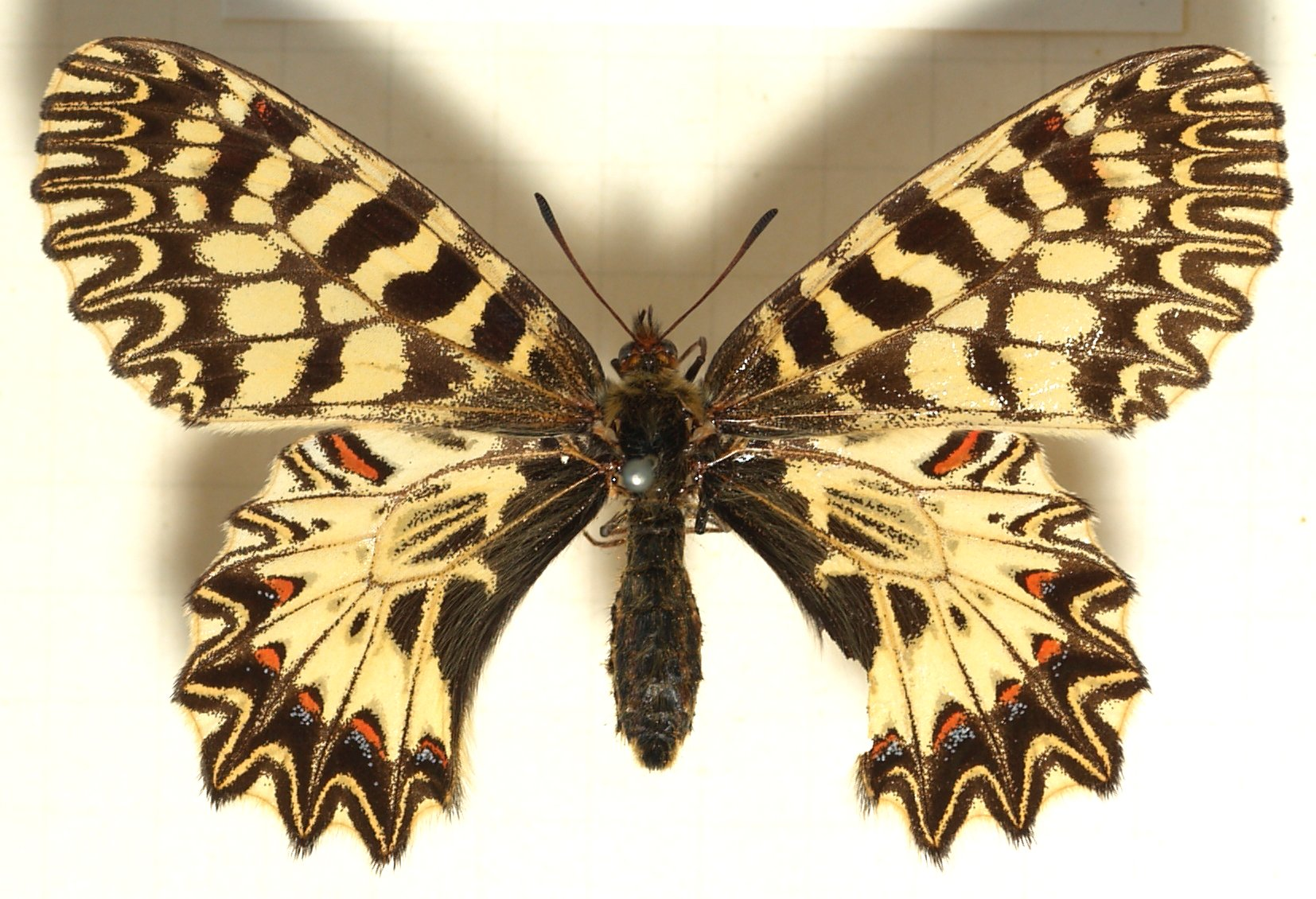
Mounted specimen

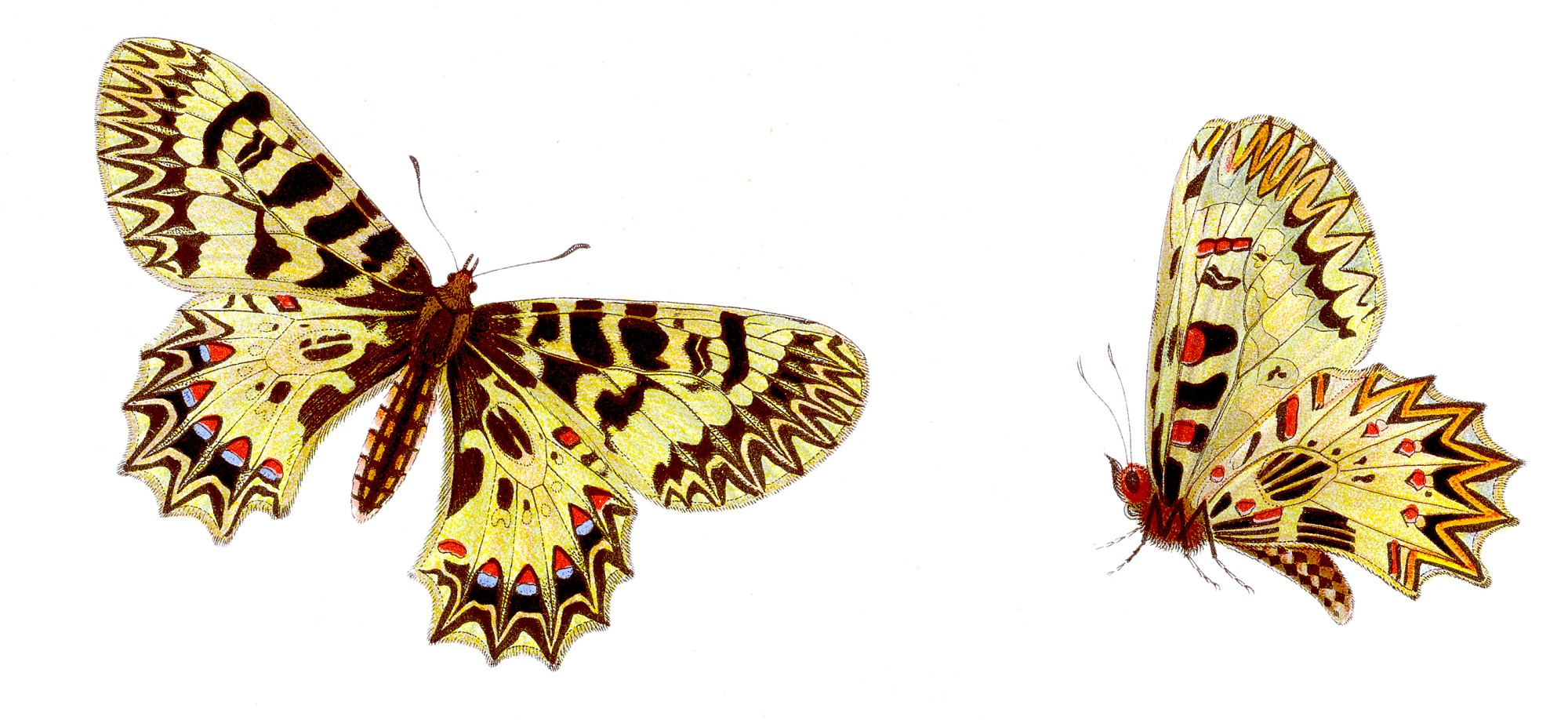
Illustration

== Distribution ==
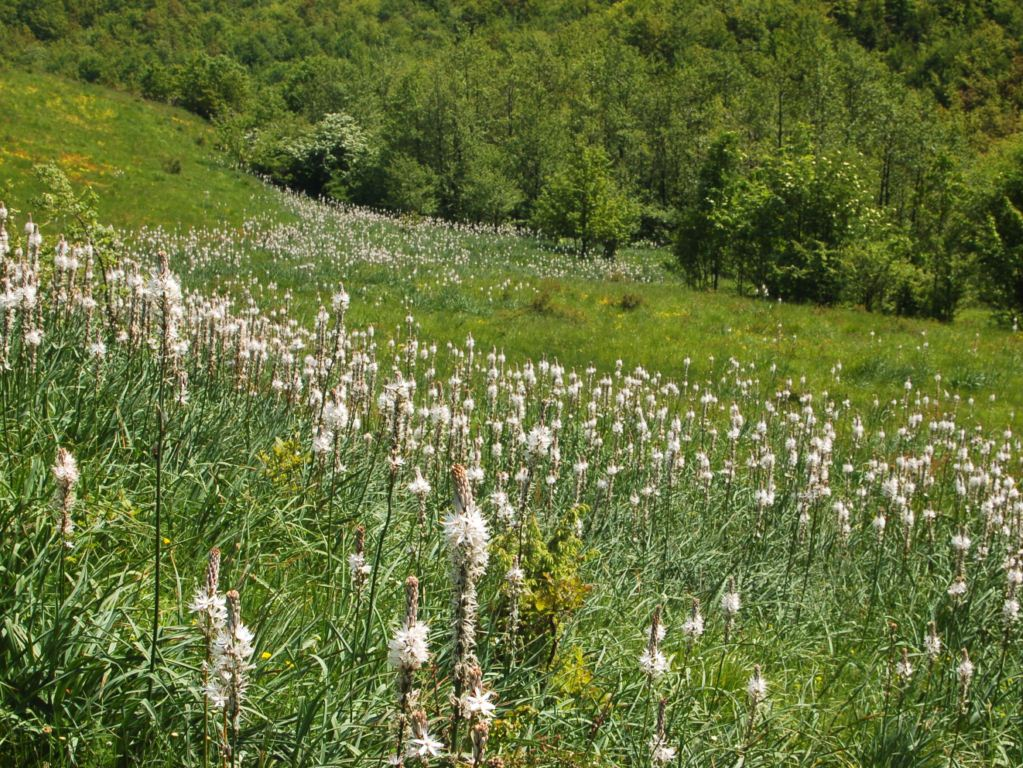
Habitat of Z. polyxena, Regional Park of Capanne di Marcarolo (Piedmont), about 900 m. above sea level

Z. polyxena is widespread in the middle and southern Europe (southeastern France, Italy, Slovakia and Greece) covering all the Balkans and reaching the south of Kazakhstan and the Urals. Although they are widespread they occur only locally.

== Habitat ==
These rare butterflies can be found in warm, sunny and open places such as grassy herb-rich meadows, vineyards, river banks, wetlands, cultivated areas, brushy places, wasteland, rocky cliffs and karst terrains, at an elevation of from 0 to 1,700 metres above sea level but usually below 900 metres.

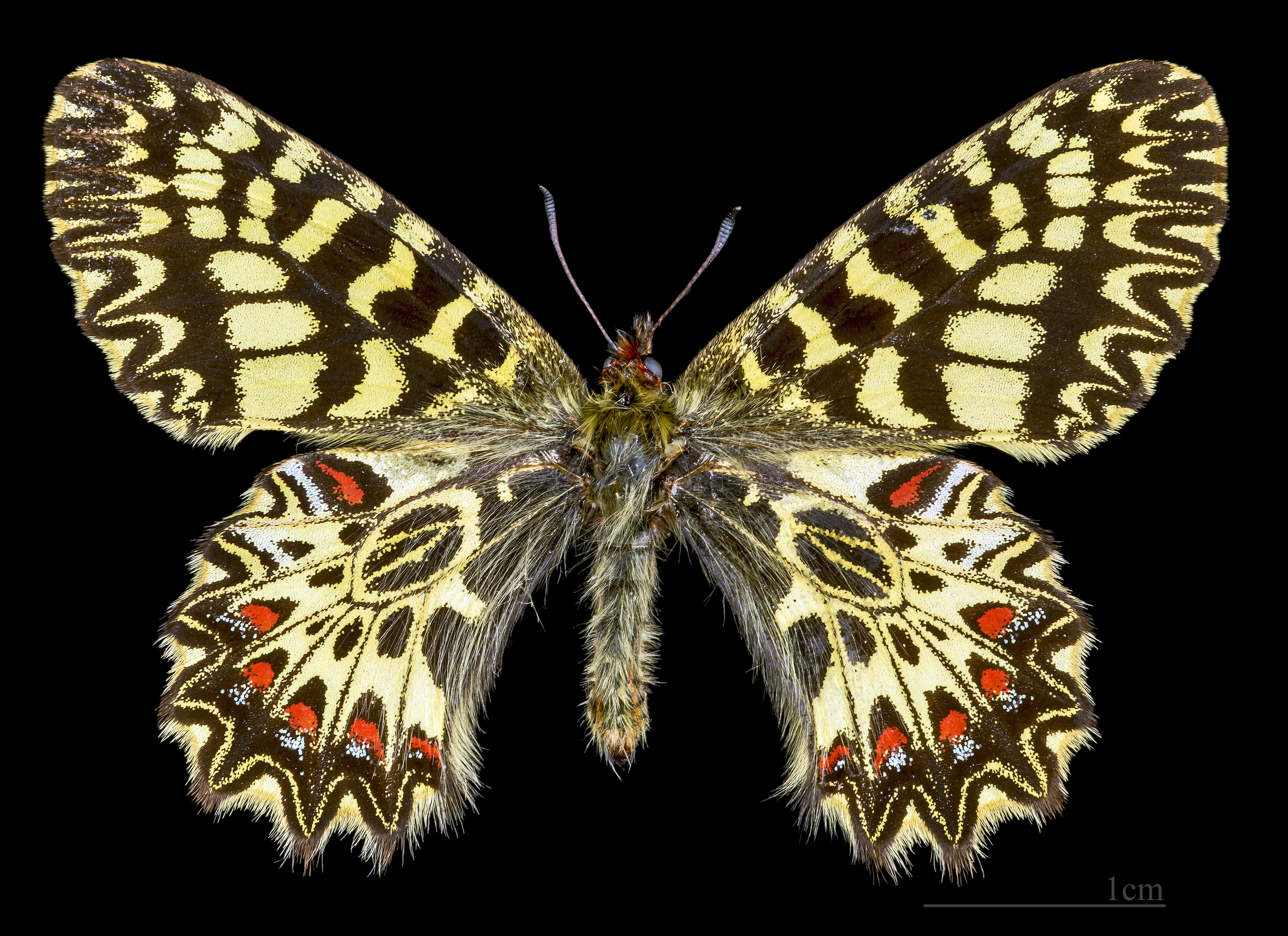
Male

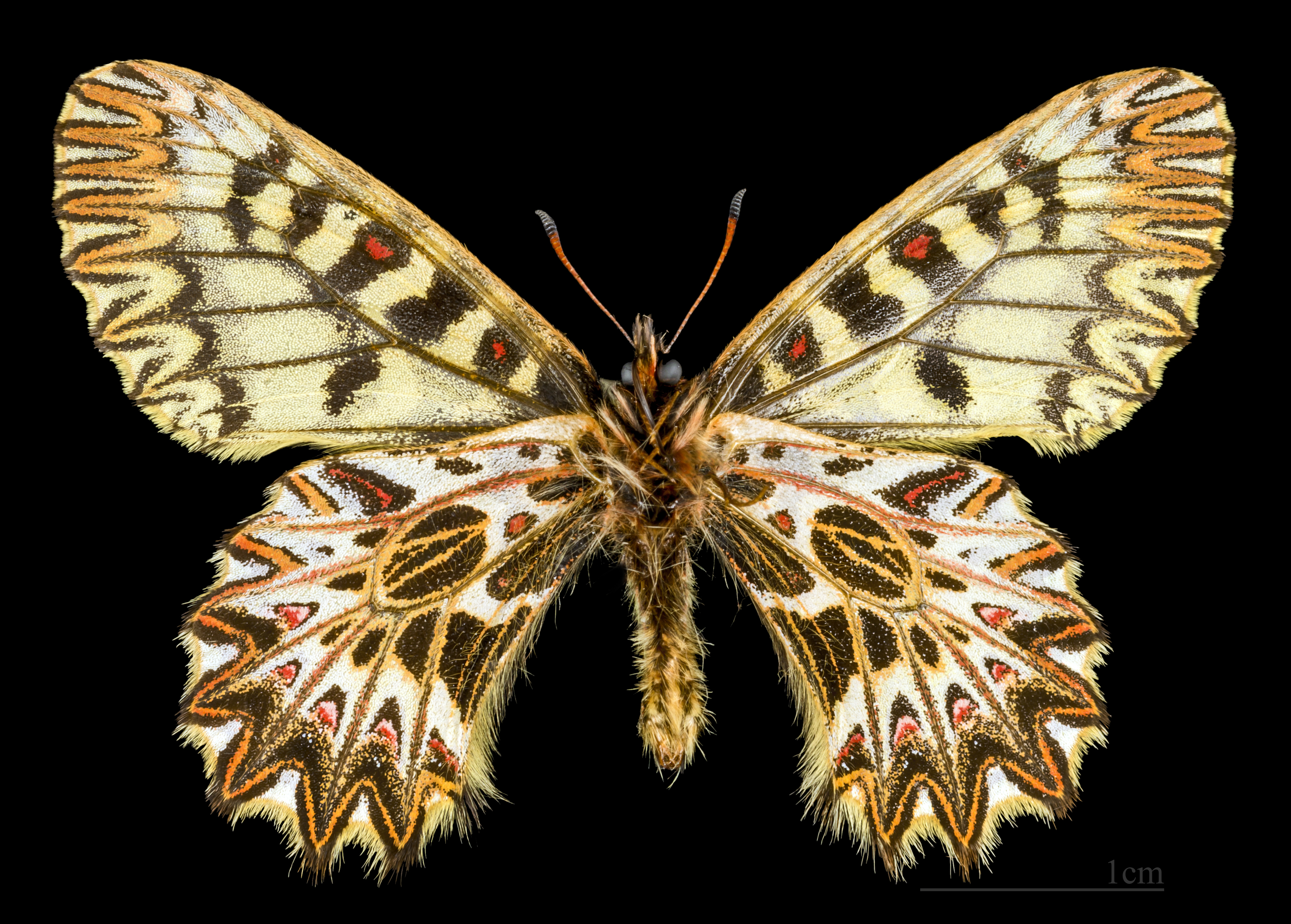
Male bottom

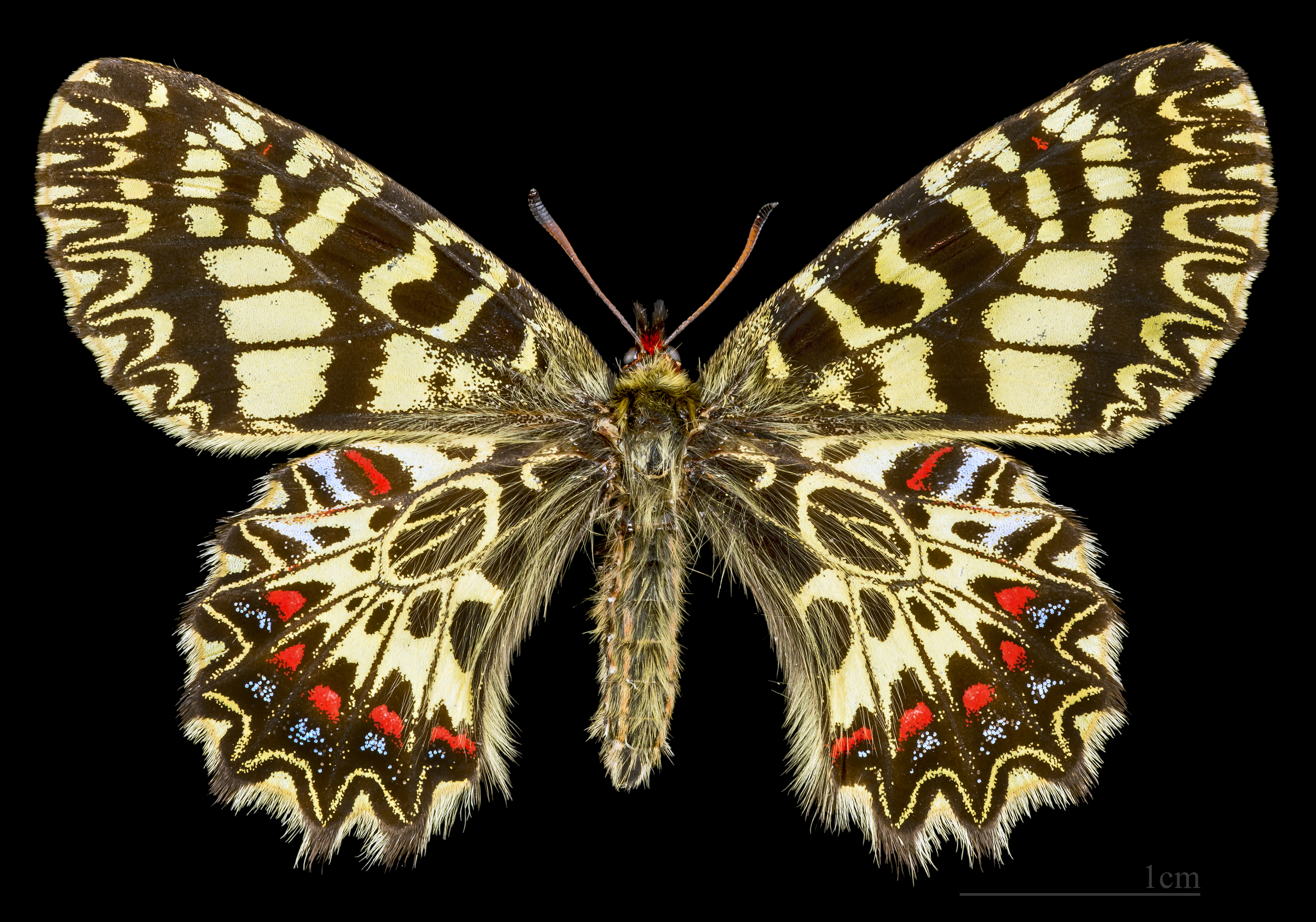
Female

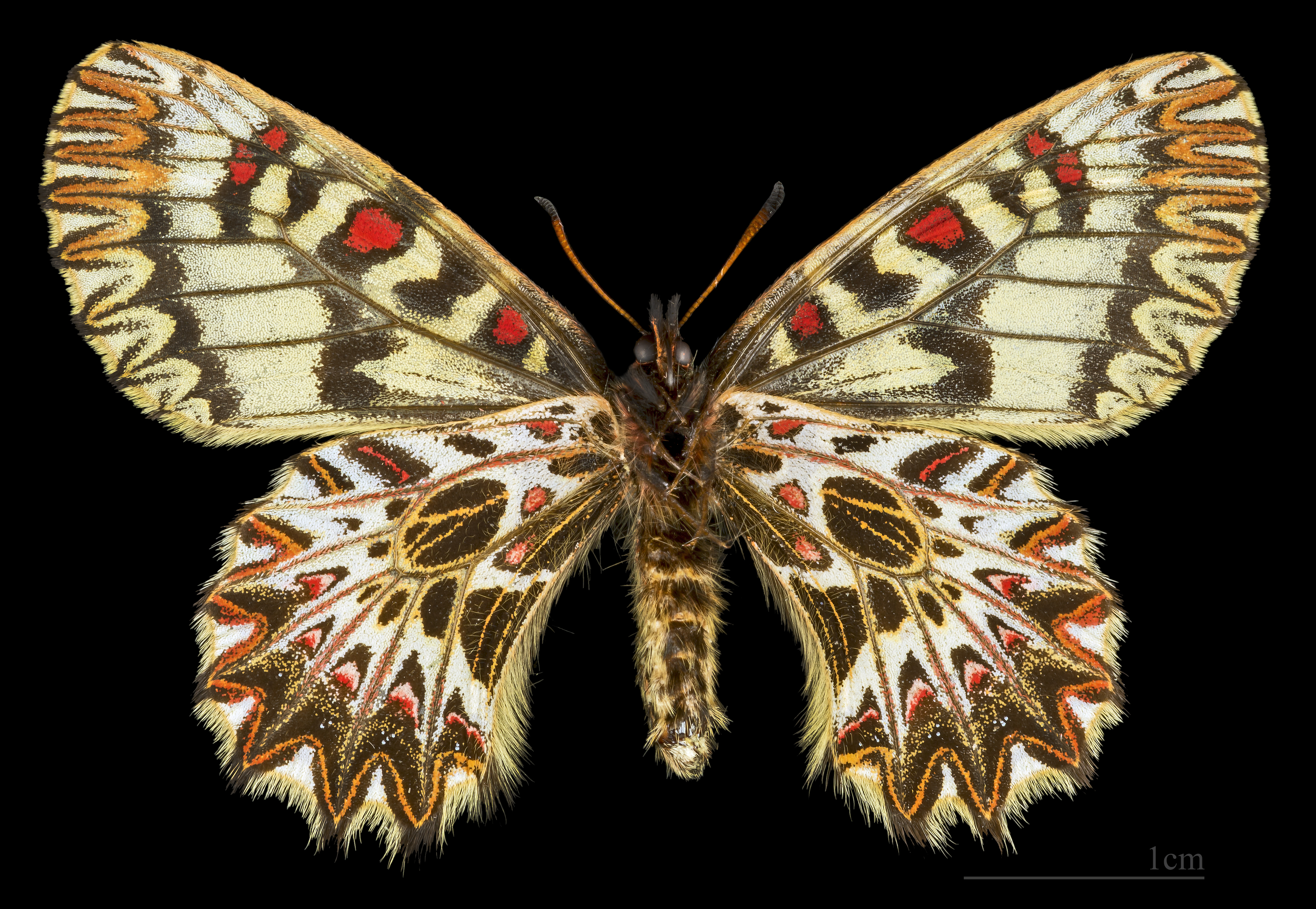
Female bottom

== Biology ==
It is an early spring butterfly. Adults fly from April to June in a single brood. The adults are active for no more than three weeks. The females lay their eggs singly or in small groups at the bottom of the host plants. When found in the wild they prefer to live and lay their eggs in densely vegetated areas, and there is a positive correlation between number of leaves on the host plant and number of eggs laid by females. The eggs are spherical and whitish at first, bluish colored before hatching. The caterpillars feed on birthworts (mainly (Aristolochia clematitis, Aristolochia rotunda, Aristolochia pistolochia, Aristolochia pallida). The special food of the larvae provides the toxic substances which then also go to the adults, making them unpalatable. The young caterpillars feed at first on flowers and young shoots, while after the second molt they feed on leaves. The pupae stay linked to a support by a silk belt for wintering and the new adults hatch the next spring.

Life cycle of Zerynthia polyxena

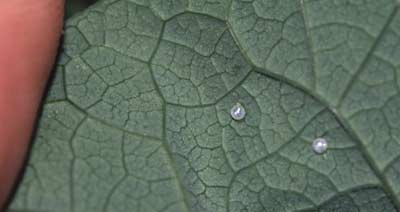
Eggs

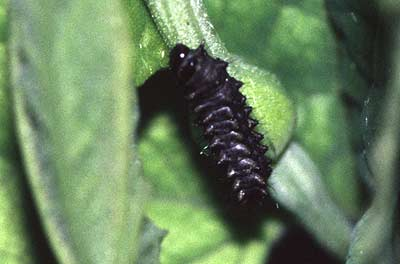
Young caterpillar

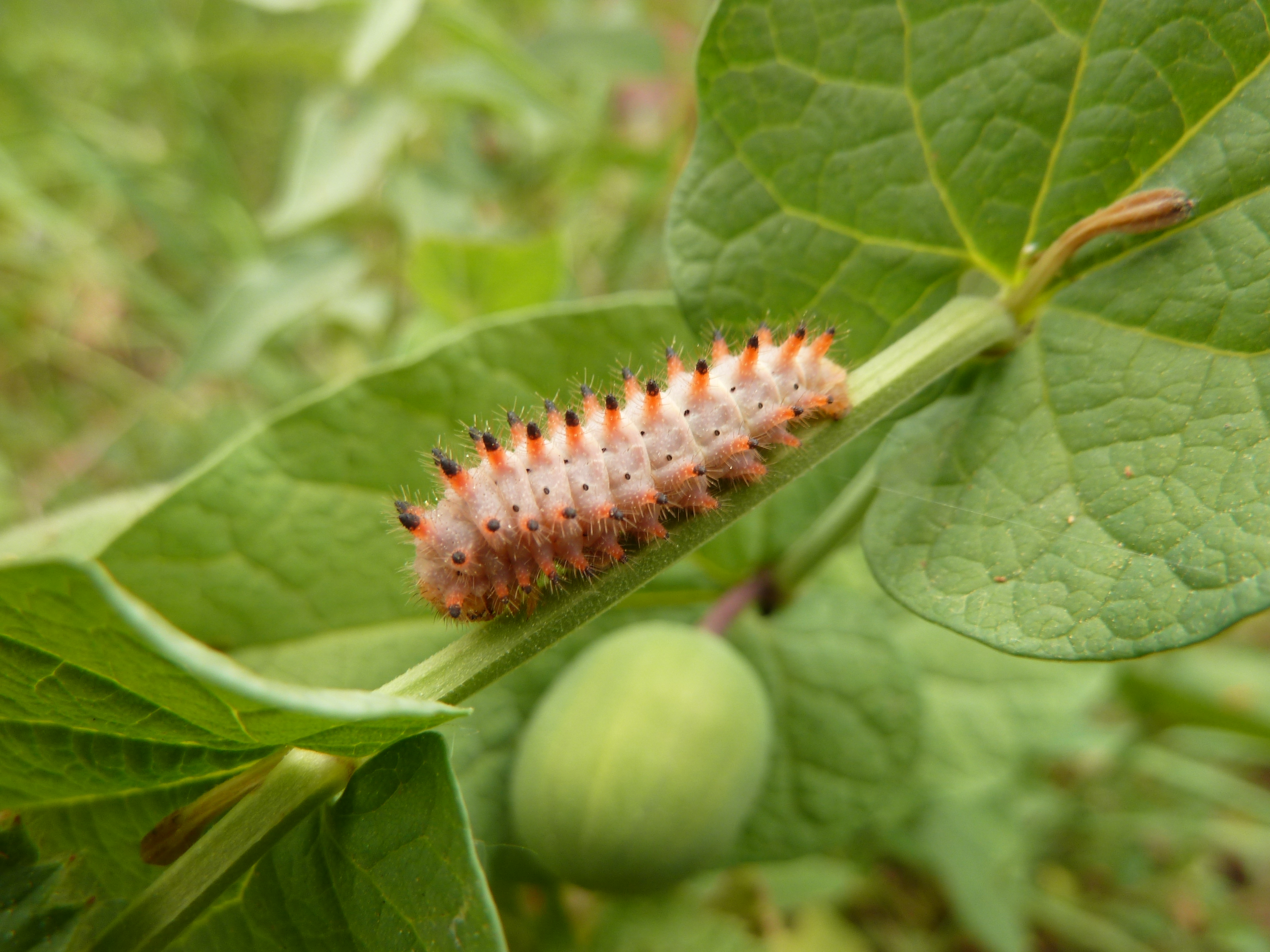
Caterpillar on Aristolochia species

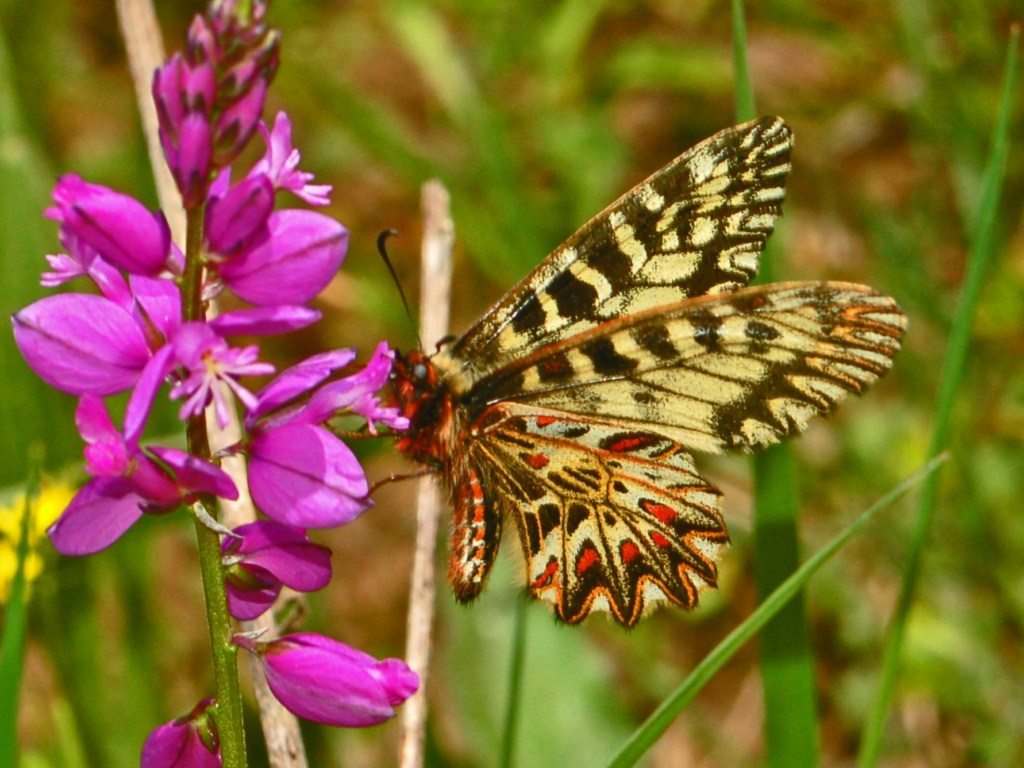

== Subspecies and forms ==
Under the rules of the International Code of Zoological Nomenclature, Article 1.3.4, names used only below the rank of subspecies do not enter into consideration in zoological nomenclature; infrasubspecific names do not have formally recognized authorship, and do not compete for priority or homonymy with names used for species or subspecies. Accordingly, all of the names used for "forms" of Z. polyxena listed below must be disregarded as having no nomenclatural standing whatsoever, even though many are presented with authors and dates.

Subspecies and forms include:

- Zerynthia polyxena polyxena (Denis & Schiffermüller, 1775) in Italy
  - Zerynthia polyxena polyxena f. punctata Schultz, 1908
  - Zerynthia polyxena polyxena f. marpha Schultz, 1908
  - Zerynthia polyxena polyxena f. rubra Hoffmann], 1916
  - Zerynthia polyxena polyxena f. bella Neuburger, 1903
  - Zerynthia polyxena polyxena f. bipunctata Cosmovici, 1892
  - Zerynthia polyxena polyxena f. meridionalis Hoffmann, 1916
  - Zerynthia polyxena polyxena f. tripunctata Zelezny, 1916
  - Zerynthia polyxena polyxena f. nora Schultz, 1908 (kreusa Tomala)
  - Zerynthia polyxena polyxena f. muelleri Bryk, 1921 (mulleri Bryk, recte muelleri)
  - Zerynthia polyxena polyxena f. springeri Ronnicke, 1906
  - Zerynthia polyxena polyxena f. reducta Zelezny, 1915
  - Zerynthia polyxena polyxena f. nigromaculata Zelezny, 1915
  - Zerynthia polyxena polyxena f. unimaculata Zelezny, 1915
  - Zerynthia polyxena polyxena f. demaculata Schultz, 1908
  - Zerynthia polyxena polyxena f. confluens Schultz, 1908
  - Zerynthia polyxena polyxena f. lateviltata Schultz, 1908
  - Zerynthia polyxena polyxena f. fasciata Begrer, 1919
  - Zerynthia polyxena polyxena f. skalae Zelezny, 1917
  - Zerynthia polyxena polyxena f. derubescens Zullich, 1928
  - Zerynthia polyxena polyxena f. alba Esper, 1805
  - Zerynthia polyxena polyxena f. subalba Schultz, 1908
  - Zerynthia polyxena polyxena f. rufescens Oberthür, 1879
  - Zerynthia polyxena polyxena f. meta Meigen
  - Zerynthia polyxena polyxena f. ochracea Staudinger, 1861
  - Zerynthia polyxena polyxena f. cellopura Eisner
  - Zerynthia polyxena polyxena f. basinigra Eisner
  - Zerynthia polyxena polyxena f. quincunx Eisner
  - Zerynthia polyxena polyxena f. divisa Schultz, 1908
  - Zerynthia polyxena polyxena f. ornata Eisner
  - Zerynthia polyxena polyxena f. vitrina Rothschild
  - Zerynthia polyxena polyxena f. irregularis Holland
- Zerynthia polyxena aemiliae Rocci, 1929 in North Italy; Lombardy: Massa Lombarda, Modena, Livorno
- Zerynthia polyxena albanica Riemel, 1927 in Albania
- Zerynthia polyxena australis (Esper, 1780) (medesicaste Hoffmannsegg) (south France: Provence - east Pyrenees)
  - Zerynthia polyxena australis f. alicea Neuburger, 1903
  - Zerynthia polyxena australis f. paucipunctata Neuburger
  - Zerynthia polyxena australis f. tristis Verity
  - Zerynthia polyxena australis f. divisa Schultez
  - Zerynthia polyxena australis f. hartmanni Staudfuss, 1896
  - Zerynthia polyxena australis f. unipunctata Eisner, 1954
  - Zerynthia polyxena australis f. minusculus Eisner
  - Zerynthia polyxena australis f. vitrina Rothschild sensu Eisner
  - Zerynthia polyxena australis f. aperta Eisner, 1954
  - Zerynthia polyxena australis f. quincunx Eisner
  - Zerynthia polyxena australis f. honnerathii Boisduval, 1832
  - Zerynthia polyxena australis f. albescens Eisner
  - Zerynthia polyxena australis f. binaria Eisner
- Zerynthia polyxena bosniensis Eisner, 1974 in Bosnia
  - Zerynthia polyxena bosniensis f. ochracea Staudinger, 1861
  - Zerynthia polyxena bosniensis f.reducta Zelzny, 1915
- Zerynthia polyxena bryki Eisner, 1954 in Montenegro, Herzegovina border
- Zerynthia polyxena cantabrica Gomez-Bustille (Spain: Cantabrica)
- Zerynthia polyxena carmenae Sabariego et Martinez, 1991 in Bulgaria
- Zerynthia polyxena cassandra (Geyer, 1828) in south France, north Italy
  - Zerynthia polyxena cassandra f. ochracea Staudinger, 1861
  - Zerynthia polyxena cassandra f. vitrina Rothschild, 1918
  - Zerynthia polyxena cassandra f. inornata Pionneau
  - Zerynthia polyxena cassandra f. bella Neuburger
  - Zerynthia polyxena cassandra f. reducta Železný, 1915
  - Zerynthia polyxena cassandra f. quincunx Eisner
  - Zerynthia polyxena cassandra f. microcreusa Verity, 1947
  - Zerynthia polyxena cassandra f. deminuta Verity, 1947
- Zerynthia polyxena cassandra-clara Verity, 1947 in Croatia
- Zerynthia polyxena castiliana Ruhl, 1892 (transcastilia Mon) (Central Spain: Castilia, Albarracín)
  - Zerynthia polyxena castiliana f. derubescens Schultz
  - Zerynthia polyxena castiliana f. honnorathii Boisduval, 1832 (henrietta Timmins)
  - Zerynthia polyxena castiliana f. tristis Verity, 1906
  - Zerynthia polyxena castiliana f. semitristis de Sagarra, 1930
  - Zerynthia polyxena castiliana f. ornatissima Blachier, 1908
  - Zerynthia polyxena castiliana f. nigricans Holland
  - Zerynthia polyxena castiliana f. alicea Neuburger, 1903
- Zerynthia polyxena catalonica de Sagarra 1930 (Spain: Catalonia)
  - Zerynthia polyxena catalonica f. semitristis de Sagarra, 1930
- Zerynthia polyxena caucasiae Nardelli & Hirschfeld, 2002 north west of Caucasus
- Zerynthia polyxena creusa Meigen, 1829 (central Italy: Ventimiglia (Verity, 1950), cf. Eisner, 1974!)
- Zerynthia polyxena decastroi Sala & Bollino, 1992 in Italy
- Zerynthia polyxena deminuta Verity, 1947 southern of France
- Zerynthia polyxena demnosia Freyer, 1833 (Dahl MS) (albanica Riemel], thusnelda Schultz) (= ssp. macedonia Eisner, 1974 (Macedonia, Thessalia, Dalmatia, Albania)
  - Zerynthia polyxena demnosia f. quincunx Eisner
  - Zerynthia polyxena demnosia f. vitrina Rothschild
  - Zerynthia polyxena demnosia f. ochracea Staudinger, 1861
- Zerynthia polyxena gracilis Schultz, 1908 in north-east Turkey: Brusa, Karagja Dagh
- Zerynthia polyxena idaensis Eisner, 1974 in Crete
  - Zerynthia polyxena idaensis f. rumina Linne, 1758
- Zerynthia polyxena latevittata (Verity, 1919) in Sicily
- Zerynthia polyxena latiaris Stichel, 1907 in south Italy: Calabria, Rome, Monti Albani
- Zerynthia polyxena linnea (Bryk, 1932) in Italy, Elba
- Zerynthia polyxena macedonia Eisner, 1974 in Macedonia
- Zerynthia polyxena michaelis Nardelli, 1993 in Italy
- Zerynthia polyxena microcreusa Verity, 1947 southern of France
- Zerynthia polyxena minima Gerhardinger, 1951 Spain: Toledo)
- Zerynthia polyxena nemorensis (Verity, 1919) in Italy: Toscana, Firenze.
- Zerynthia polyxena nigra Sijaric, 1989 in Bosnia
- Zerynthia polyxena padana Rocci, 1929 in north Italy: Piedmont, Lombardy, Turin
- Zerynthia polyxena patrizii Nardelli, 1993 in Italy
- Zerynthia polyxena petheri Romei, 1927 (south Spain: Sierra Nevada)
- Zerynthia polyxena petri (Bryk, 1932) in Greece, south Ukrainskaja: Cherson, Kiev, lower Juzinyi Bug, Krim
- Zerynthia polyxena polymnia (Millière, 1880) in Greece: Euboea
- Zerynthia polyxena reverdinii Fruhstorfer, 1908 in west and north Italy: Liguria.
- Zerynthia polyxena silana Storace, 1962 in Italy
- Zerynthia polyxena sontae Sijaric, 1989 in Serbia
- Zerynthia polyxena taygetana Rosen, 1929 in Greece: Taygetus, Peleponesos
- Zerynthia polyxena thesto Fruhstorfer, 1908 in south-west U.S.S.R.: lower Volga, Saratow, lower Don
  - Zerynthia polyxena thesto f. rufescens Oberthür, 1879
  - Zerynthia polyxena thesto f. muelleri Bryk, 1991
  - Zerynthia polyxena thesto f. cellopura Eisner
- Zerynthia polyxena tristis de Lattin, 1950 in Turkey
- Zerynthia polyxena vipsania Hemming, 1941 (:latevittata Verity, 1919, a secondary homonym of latevittata Schultz, 1908: creusa Mann, nec Meigen, Dahl MS: polymnia Ragusa, 1906, (Sicily)

== Bibliography ==
- Capinera, J. L. (Ed.), Encyclopedia of Entomology, 4 voll., 2nd Ed., Dordrecht, Springer Science+Business Media B.V., 2008, pp. lxiii + 4346, ISBN 978-1-4020-6242-1, LCCN 2008930112, OCLC 837039413.
- Dapporto, L., Speciation in Mediterranean refugia and post-glacial expansion of Zerynthia polyxena (Lepidoptera, Papilionidae). J. Zool. Syst. Evol. Res., in press.doi: 10.1111/j.1439-0469.2009.00550.x
- Higgins, L.G, Riley, N.D, 1970; A Field Guide to the Butterflies of Britain and Europe
- Koren, Toni; Lauš, Boris; Šašić, Martina; Mihoci, Iva; Štih, Ana; Bralić, Petra; Gomboc, Stanislav (2017-12-31). "Contribution to the Knowledge of the Butterfly Fauna (Lepidoptera: Papilionoidea) of Hrvatsko Zagorje, Croatia". Natura Croatica: Periodicum Musei Historiae Naturalis Croatici. 26 (2): 167–196. doi:10.20302/NC.2017.26.15. eISSN 1848-7386.
- Kükenthal, W. (Ed.), Handbuch der Zoologie / Handbook of Zoology, Band 4: Arthropoda - 2. Hälfte: Insecta - Lepidoptera, moths and butterflies, in Kristensen, N. P. (a cura di), Handbuch der Zoologie, Fischer, M. (Scientific Editor), Teilband/Part 35: Volume 1: Evolution, systematics, and biogeography, Berlino, New York, Walter de Gruyter, 1999 [1998], pp. x + 491, ISBN 978-3-11-015704-8, OCLC 174380917.
- Nazari, V., Sperling, F.A.H. 2007; Mitochondrial DNA divergence and phylogeography in western Palaearctic Parnassiinae (Lepidoptera:Papilionidae): how many species are there? Insect Syst Evol 38:121–138.
- Scoble, M. J., The Lepidoptera: Form, Function and Diversity, 2nd ed., London, Oxford University Press & Natural History Museum, 2011 [1992], pp. xi, 404, ISBN 978-0-19-854952-9, LCCN 92004297, OCLC 25282932.
- Stehr, F. W. (Ed.), Immature Insects, 2 vol., 2nd ed. Dubuque, Iowa, Kendall/Hunt Pub. Co., 1991 [1987], pp. ix, 754, ISBN 978-0-8403-3702-3, LCCN 85081922, OCLC 13784377.
