= C16H11NO3 =

The molecular formula C_{16}H_{11}NO_{3} (molar mass: 265.27 g/mol) may refer to:

- Oxycinchophen
- Piperolactam A
