= Smearwort =

Smearwort is a common name for several plants and may refer to:

- Aristolochia rotunda, in the family Aristolochiaceae
- Blitum bonus-henricus, in the family Amaranthaceae
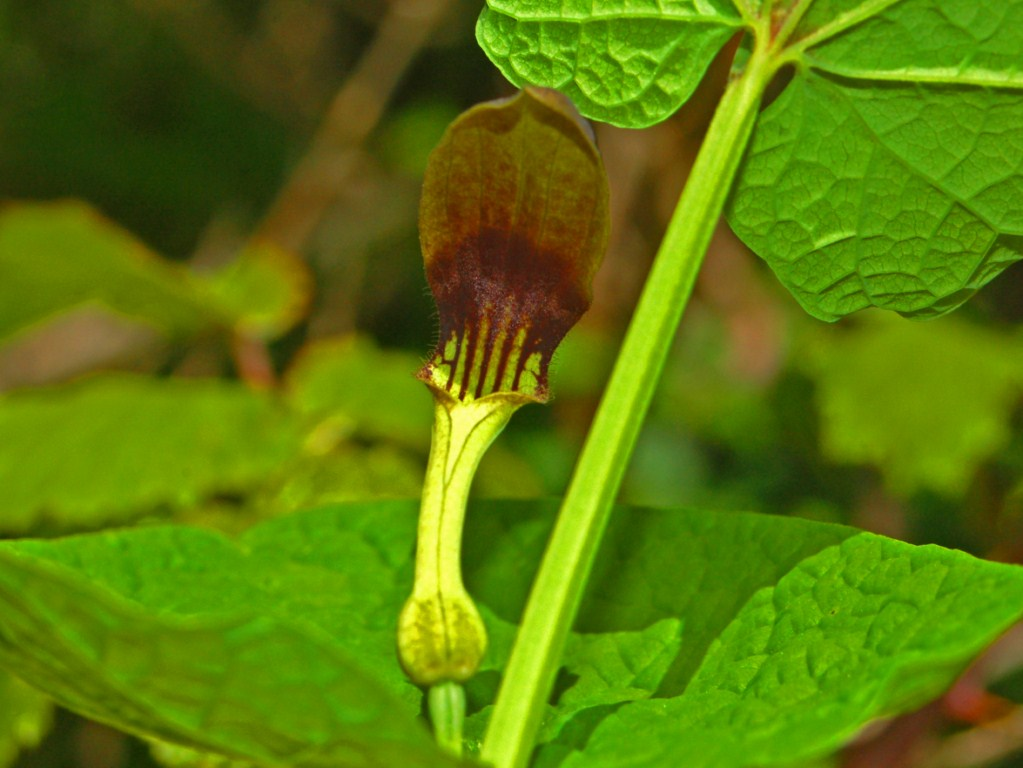
Flower of Aristolochia rotunda

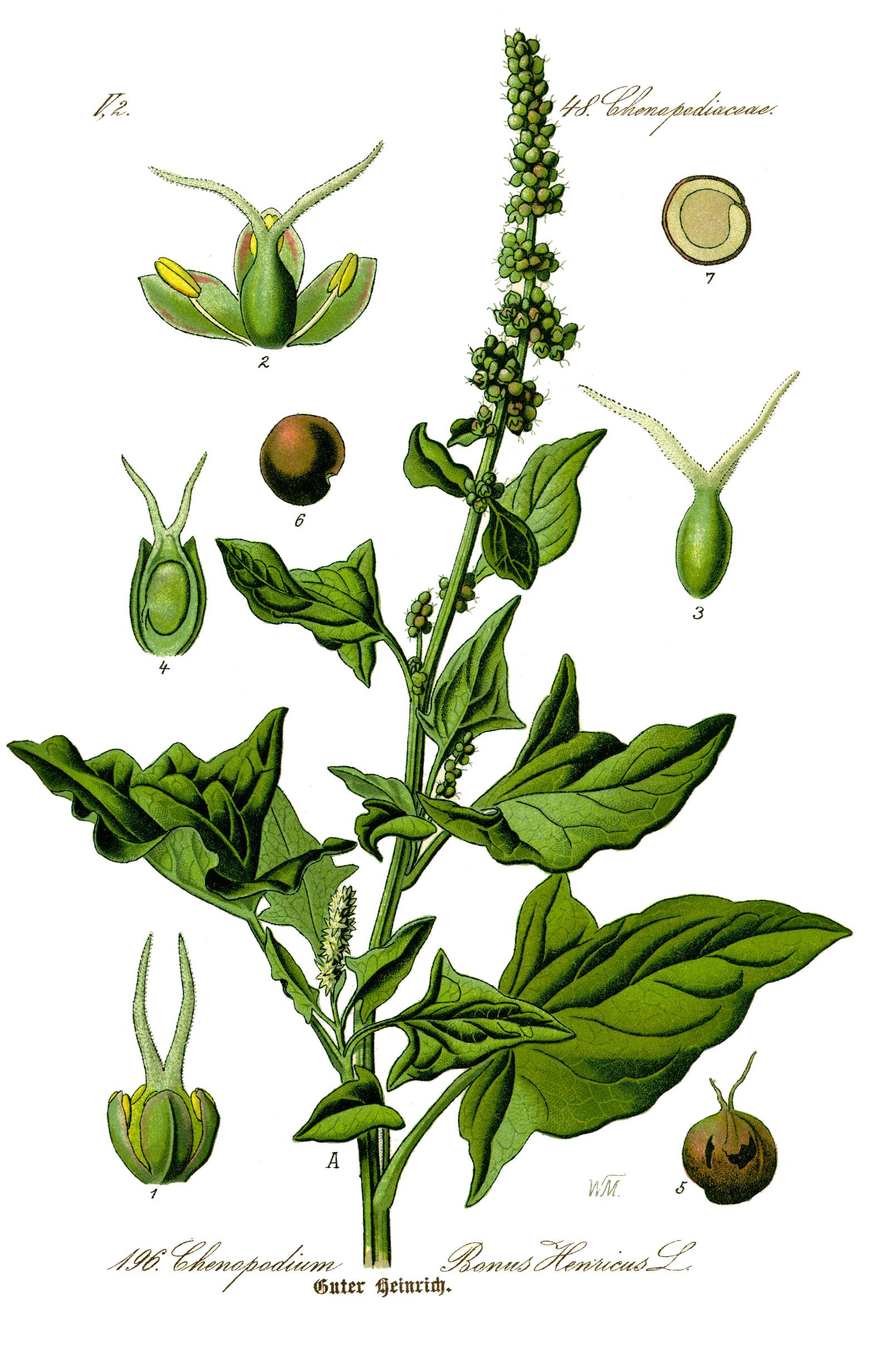
Blitum bonus-henricus
