= Piperolactam A =

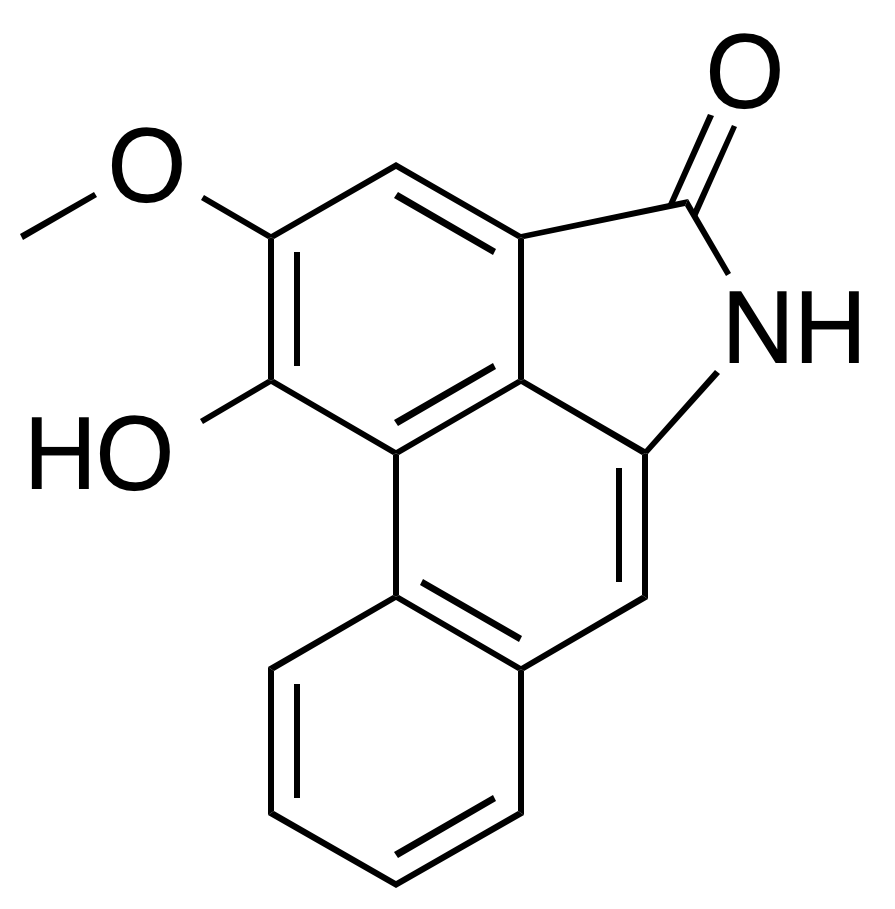

Names
- Preferred IUPAC name 1-Hydroxy-2-methoxydibenzo[cd,f]indol-4(5H)-one
- Other names Aristolactam FI

Identifiers
| CAS Number | 112501-42-5 |
| 3D model (JSmol) | Interactive image |
| ChEBI | CHEBI:387864 |
| ChEMBL | ChEMBL387864 |
| ChemSpider | 2338707 |
| PubChem CID | 3081016 |
| UNII | CXQ3T84KLC |
| CompTox Dashboard (EPA) | DTXSID90150083 |
- InChI: InChI=1S/C16H11NO3/c1-20-12-7-10-13-11(17-16(10)19)6-8-4-2-3-5-9(8)14(13)15(12)18/h2-7,18H,1H3,(H,17,19) Key: KBGNBPGXVKPRQI-UHFFFAOYSA-N
- SMILES: COC1=CC2=C3C(NC2=O)=CC2=C(C=CC=C2)C3=C1O

Properties
| Chemical formula | C_{16}H_{11}NO_{3} |
| Molar mass | 265.268 g·mol^{−1} |
| Melting point | 313 °C (595 °F; 586 K) |
- Except where otherwise noted, data are given for materials in their standard state (at 25 °C [77 °F], 100 kPa). Infobox references

Piperolactam A is a tetracyclic alkaloid found in many plants but first isolated from the roots of Piper longum (long pepper). As a group, such compounds are called aristolactams, and are related to the aristolochic acid found in European birthwort.

== History ==
Piperolactam A was first reported in 1988 after isolation from an extract of Piper longum. Many closely related natural product alkaloids are known including aristolochic acid and its lactam derivatives. In some reports, piperolactam A is called aristolactam FI.

== Synthesis ==
=== Biosynthesis ===
It has been suggested that piperolactam A and related compounds are biosynthesised from aporphine class precursors.

=== Chemical synthesis ===
Aristolactams including piperolactam A have been the subject of total synthesis studies, which have been reviewed.

== Natural occurrence ==
Piperolactam A and related compounds are found in Aristolochiaceae (birthwort), Annonaceae (custard apple), Piperaceae (pepper), and Saururaceae plant families.
