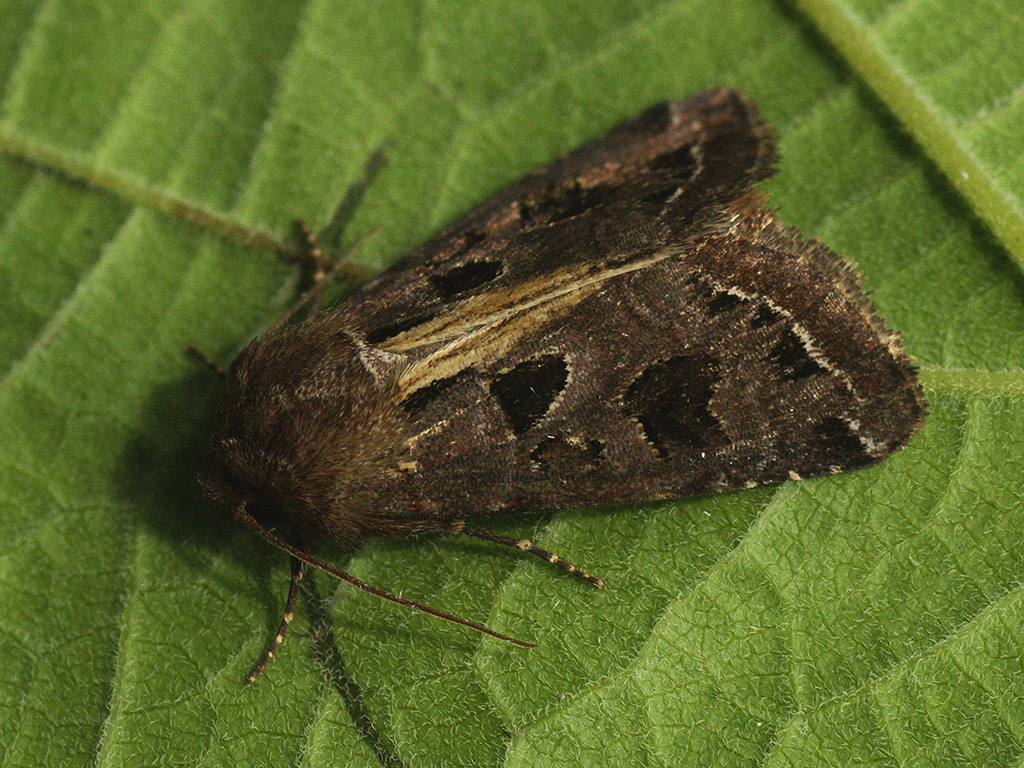
- Hyssia cavernosa

Scientific classification
- Kingdom: Animalia
- Phylum: Arthropoda
- Class: Insecta
- Order: Lepidoptera
- Superfamily: Noctuoidea
- Family: Noctuidae
- Tribe: Eriopygini
- Genus: Hyssia; Guenée in Boisduval & Guenée, 1852

= Hyssia =

Genus of moths

Hyssia is a genus of nocturnal moths of the family Noctuidae.

== Species ==
- Hyssia adusta Draudt, 1950
- Hyssia cavernosa (Eversmann, 1842)
- Hyssia degenerans Dyar, 1914
- Hyssia hadulina Draudt, 1950
- Hyssia pallidicosta Hampson, 1918
- Hyssia violascens Hampson, 1905
