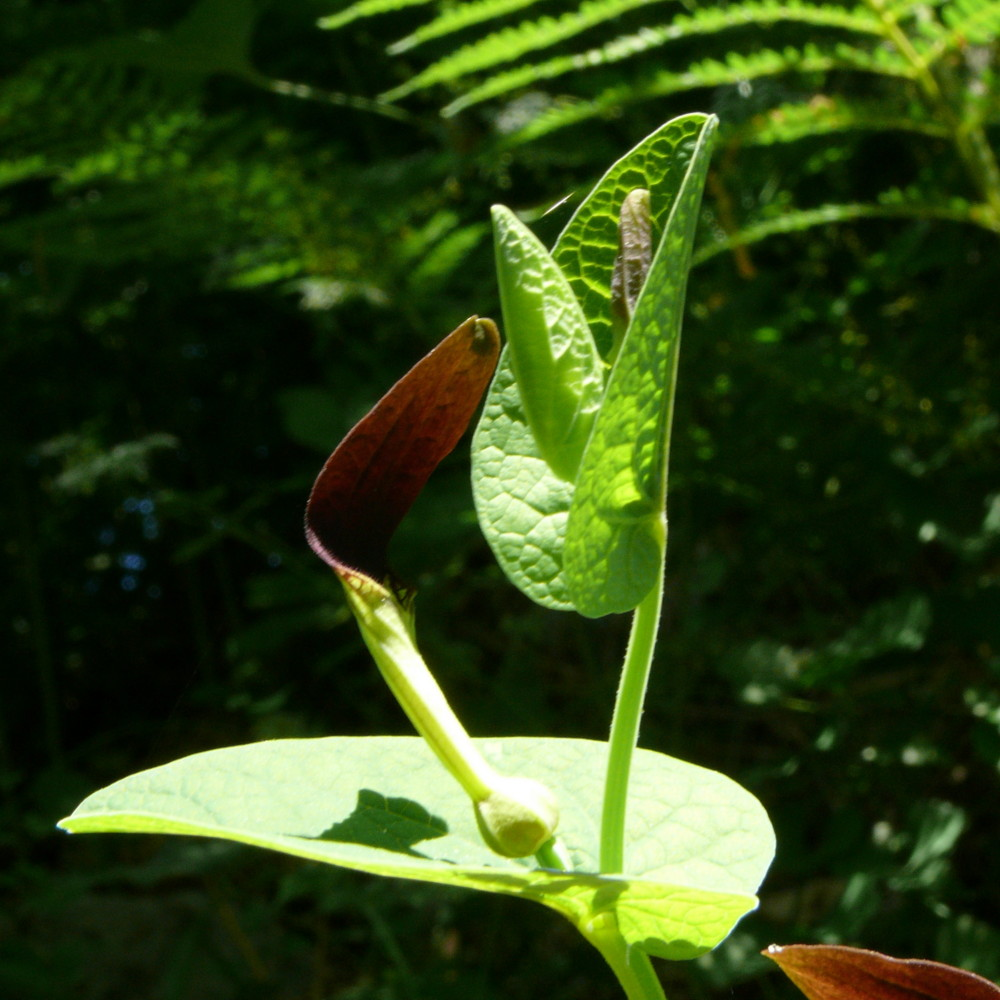

Scientific classification
- Kingdom: Plantae
- Clade: Tracheophytes
- Clade: Angiosperms
- Clade: Magnoliids
- Order: Piperales
- Family: Aristolochiaceae
- Genus: Aristolochia
- Species: A. rotunda

Binomial name
- Aristolochia rotunda L.

= Aristolochia rotunda =

Smearwort

Species of vine

Aristolochia rotunda, commonly known as smearwort or round-leaved birthwort, is a herbaceous perennial tuberous plant native to Southern Europe.

== Etymology ==
The genus name Aristolochia derives from the Greek words αριστος (aristos) meaning "the best" and 'lochéia' meaning 'childbirth', for the old use in promoting uterine contractions. The Latin name of the species rotunda refers to the rounded shape of the leaves.

== Description ==
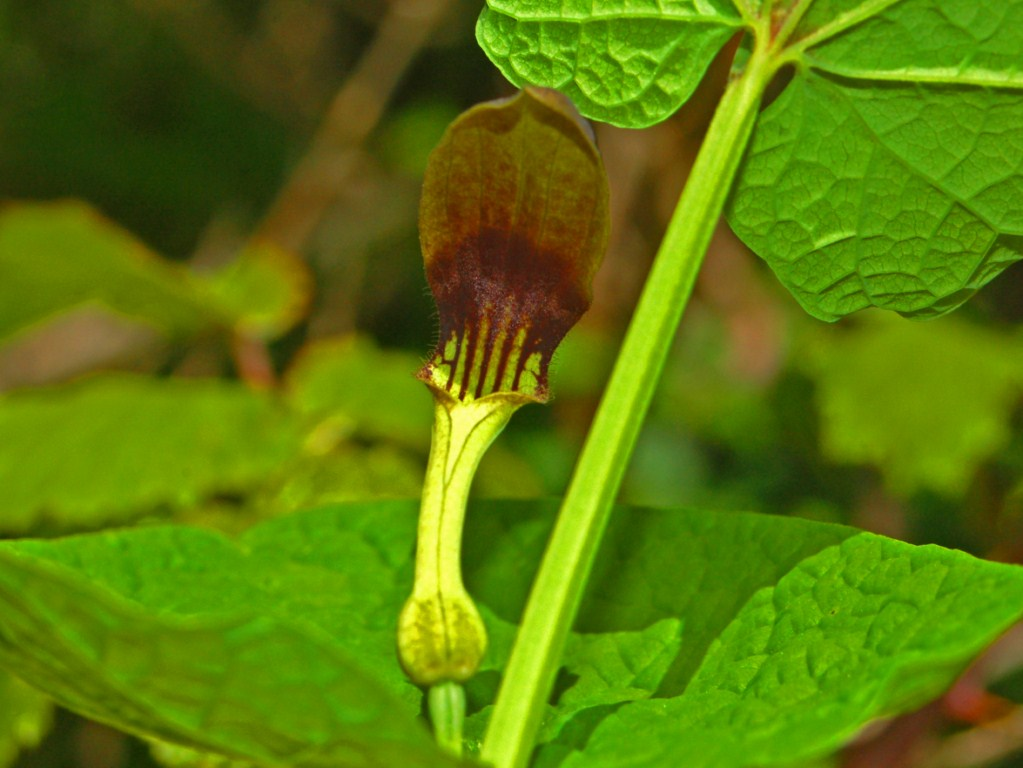
Close-up on a flower of Aristolochia rotunda

It grows to 20–60 centimetres (8–24 in) long, with slender, glabrescent, unbranched or branched stems. The root, a tuber, reaches 5–25 cm (2–10 in) in length and sometimes seems out of proportion to the slenderness of the plant. The stem has alternate, large, smooth-edged, heart-shaped, stalkless leaves 4–6 cm (1.6–2.4 in) long that clasp the stem with enlarged, basal lobes. The solitary flowers are tubular, about 2.5–5 centimetres (1–2 in) long, yellowish-green with a prominent, dark brown to dark purple flap, arising from the axils of the leaves; they have an unpleasant smell. The flowering period extends from April to June.

== Reproduction ==
The flowers of Aristolochia rotunda are hermaphrodite, and are pollinated by midges and other small insects (entomophily), attracted by the smell. The small hairs inside the cup prevent the flies from coming out and flying away. After the pollination these hairs sag and allow them to escape.

This species is a host plant of the caterpillars of an uncommon butterfly, the southern festoon Zerynthia polyxena. In eating the leaves of the plant, the larvae this insect ingest aristolochic acid that make them poisonous to birds.

== Distribution ==
This plant is common in Mediterranean countries from Spain east to European Turkey. It is naturalised very locally in southern England.

== Subspecies ==
Three subspecies are accepted:

- Aristolochia rotunda subsp. rotunda (autonym)
- Aristolochia rotunda subsp. insularis (E.Nardi & Arrigoni) Gamisans
- Aristolochia rotunda subsp. reichsteinii E.Nardi

== Habitat ==
This plant occurs along the banks of canals, edges of ditches and fields, sides of roads, meadows, slopes and forests. It prefers chalky soils and moist, shady areas, and grows at altitudes of 0–800 metres (0–2,625 ft) above sea level.

== Chemical constituents ==
A. rotunda contains aristolochic acids which are carcinogenic, mutagenic, and nephrotoxic.

== Gallery ==
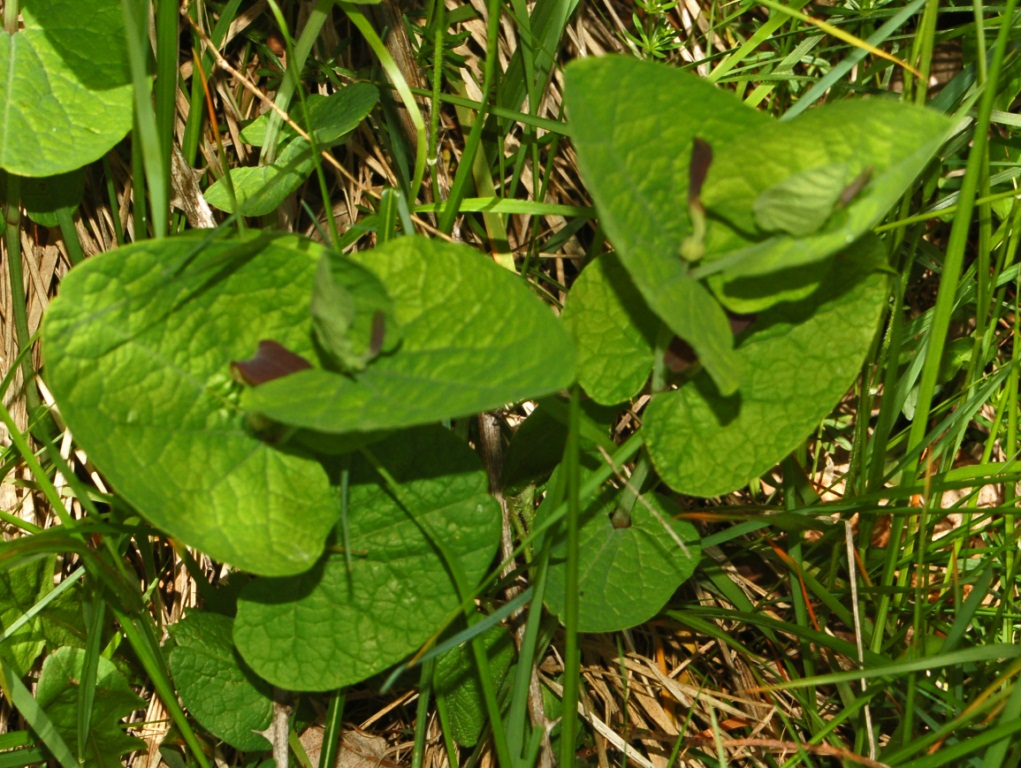
Plants of Aristolochia rotunda

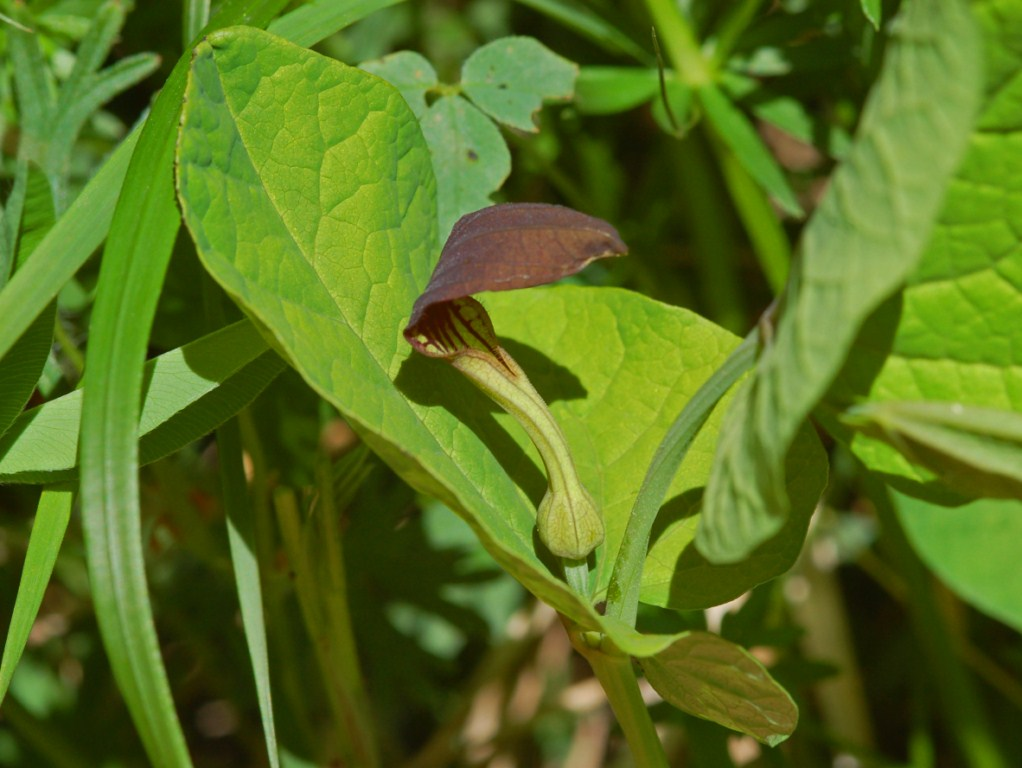
Flower of Aristolochia rotunda

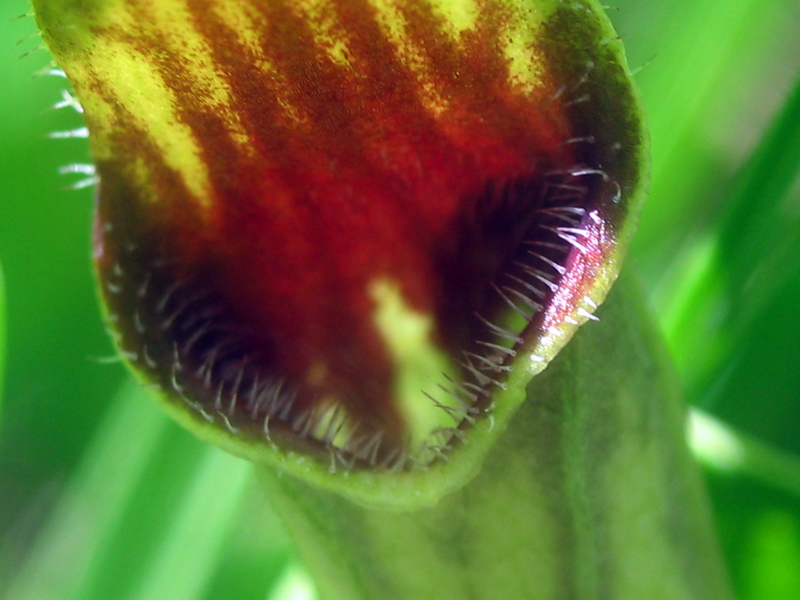
The small hairs inside the cup

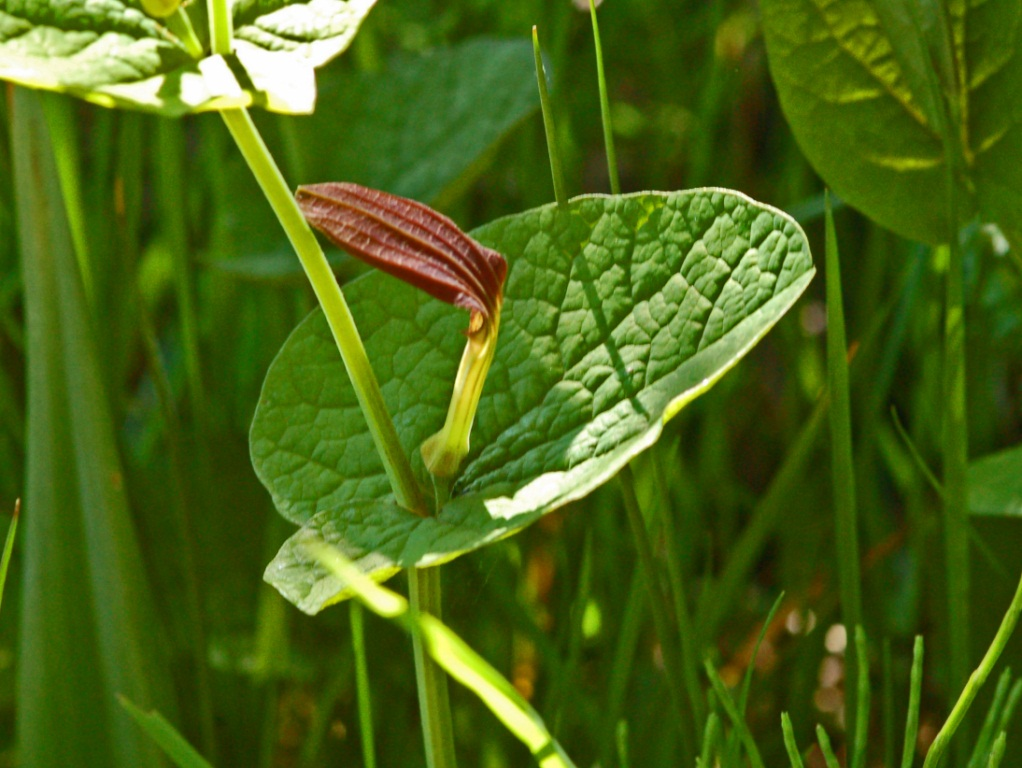
Flower and leaf of Aristolochia rotunda

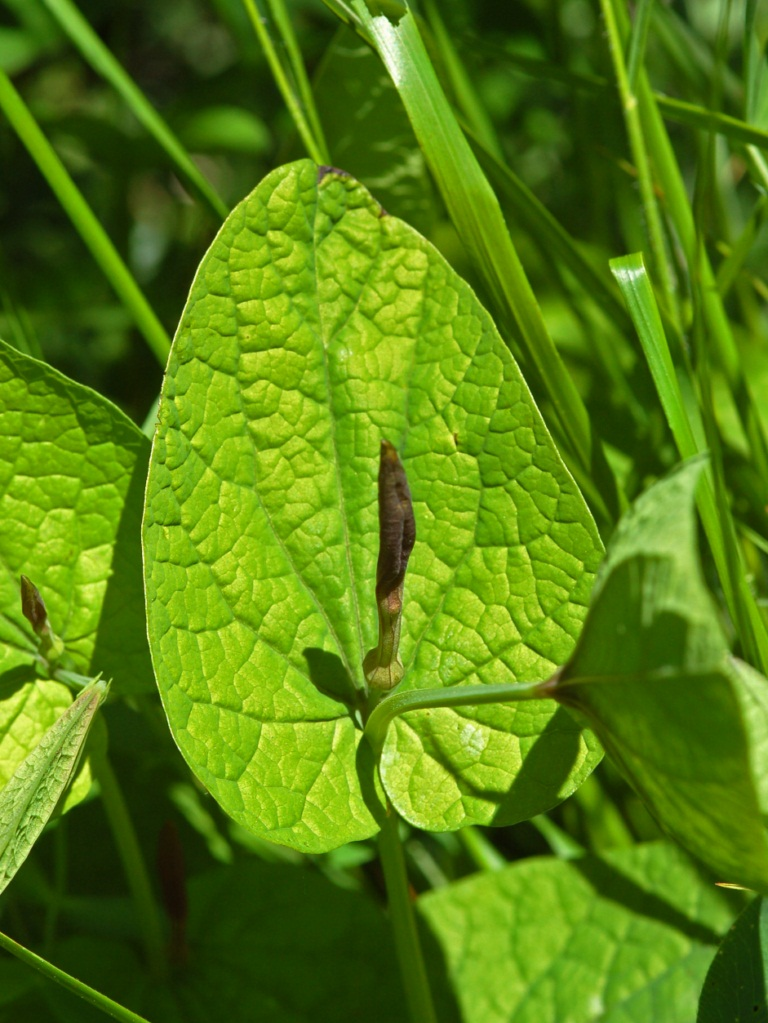
Leaf of Aristolochia rotunda

== Additional references ==
- Pignatti S. - Flora d'Italia - Edagricole – 1982, Vol. I, pag 135
- Tutin, T.G. et al. - Flora Europaea, second edition - 1993
- Björn Rulika, Stefan Wankeb, Matthias Nussa and Christoph Neinhuisb Pollination of Aristolochia pallida Willd. (Aristolochiaceae) in the Mediterranean - Flora - Morphology, Distribution, Functional Ecology of Plants - Volume 203, Pages 175-184
