= Hyssia degenerans =

Scientific classification
- Kingdom: Animalia
- Phylum: Arthropoda
- Class: Insecta
- Order: Lepidoptera
- Superfamily: Noctuoidea
- Family: Noctuidae
- Genus: Hyssia
- Species: H. degenerans

Binomial name
- Hyssia degenerans Dyar, 1914

Species of moth

Hyssia degenerans is a species of cutworm or dart moth in the family Noctuidae. It is found in Central America and North America.

The MONA or Hodges number for Hyssia degenerans is 10597.1.
