= Balkan endemic nephropathy =

- Other names: Danubian endemic familial nephropathy
- Areas in the Balkans with high prevalence
- Specialty: Nephrology

Balkan endemic nephropathy (BEN) is a form of interstitial nephritis causing kidney failure. It was first identified in the 1920s among several small, discrete communities along the Danube River and its major tributaries, in the modern countries of Croatia, Bosnia and Herzegovina, Serbia, Kosovo, Romania, and Bulgaria. It is caused by small long-term doses of aristolochic acid in the diet. The disease primarily affects people 30 to 60 years of age. Doses of the toxin are usually low and people moving to endemic areas typically develop the condition only when they have lived there for 10–20 years. People taking aristolochic acid pills as an alternative medicine have developed fast-onset kidney failure as part of a syndrome known as "Aristolochic acid nephropathy" or "Chinese herbs nephropathy".

== Signs and symptoms ==
The patients are distinguished from those suffering from other causes of end-stage renal disease by showing an absence of high blood pressure, xanthochromia of palms and soles (Tanchev's sign), early hypochromic anemia, absence of proteinuria, and slow progression of kidney failure. There is no specific therapy; BEN causes end-stage renal disease, for which the only effective treatments are dialysis or a kidney transplant. In endemic areas BEN is responsible for up to 70% of end-stage renal disease. At least 25,000 individuals are known to have this form of the disease.

Patients with BEN have a greatly increased rate of transitional cell carcinoma of the upper urothelial tract, (the renal pelvis and ureters). (In populations without BEN, most urothelial cancer occurs in the bladder. )

== Causes ==
Dietary exposure to aristolochic acid is the cause of BEN and its attendant transitional cell cancers. Former hypotheses that included roles for ochratoxin, poisoning by organic compounds leached from lignite or by heavy metals, viruses, and trace-element deficiencies, are not supported by current evidence. Genetic factors may be involved in determining which persons exposed to aristolochic acid suffer from BEN and which do not.

In the Balkan region, dietary aristolochic acid exposure may come from the consumption of the seeds of Aristolochia clematitis (European birthwort), a plant native to the endemic region, which grows among wheat plants and whose seeds mingle with the wheat used for bread. Aristolochic-acid-containing herbal remedies used in traditional Chinese medicine are associated with a related—possibly identical—condition known as "Chinese herbs nephropathy".

Exposure to aristolochic acid is associated with a high incidence of uroepithelial tumorigenesis.

== Diagnosis ==
Biopsy - For definitive diagnosis

== History ==
The first official published description of the disease was made by the Bulgarian nephrologist Dr. Yoto Tanchev (1917–2000) and his team in 1956 in the Bulgarian Journal Savremenna Medizina, a priority generally acknowledged by the international nephrological community.

The disease was originally called "Vratsa nephritis," and became known as "Balkan endemic nephropathy" later, after people living in Yugoslavia and Romania were found to be suffering from it as well.

== See also ==
- Nephropathy
- Citrinin
- Ochratoxin A
