= Aristolochic acid =

Aristolochic acid I
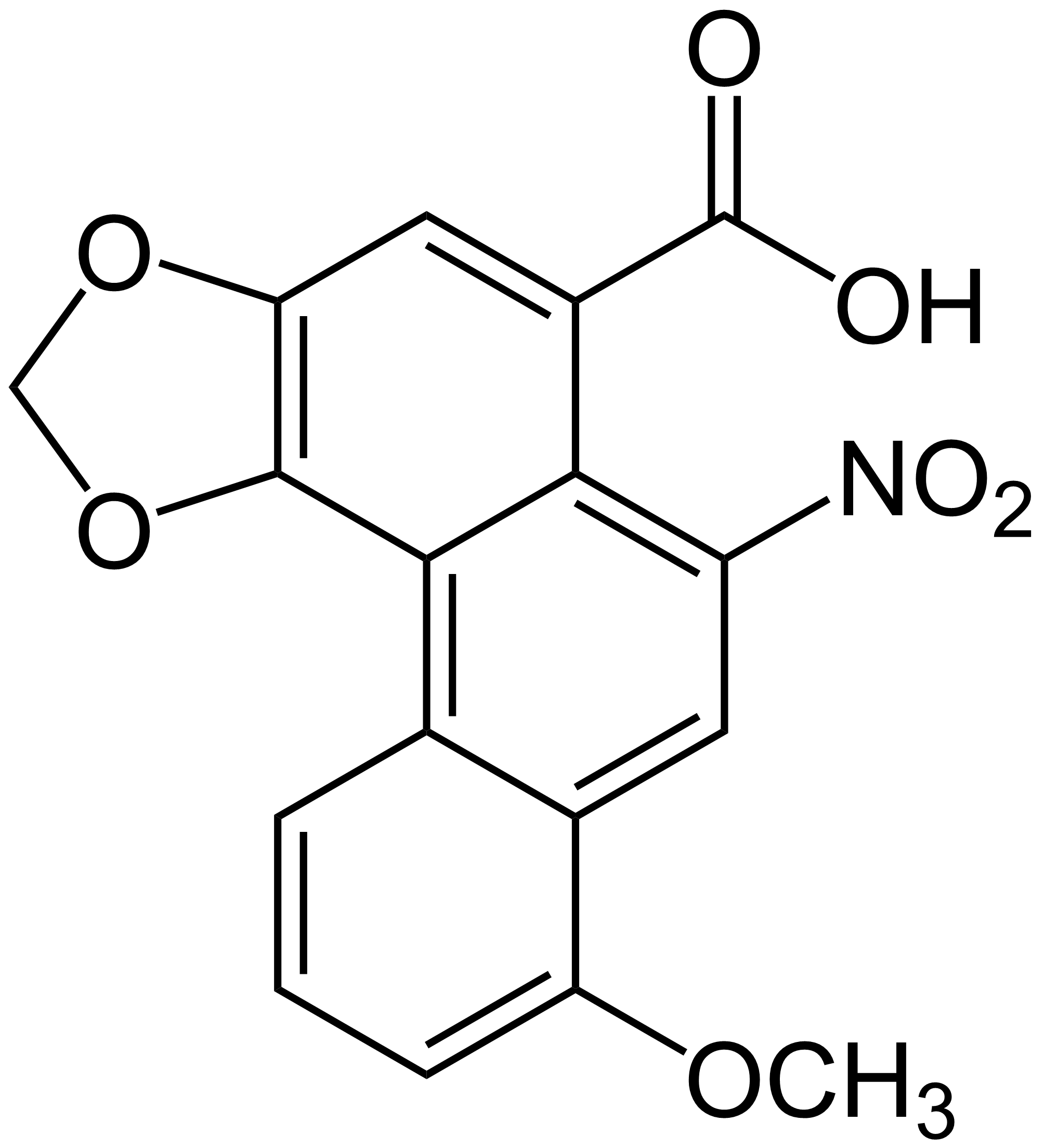

Names
- Preferred IUPAC name 8-Methoxy-6-nitro-2H-phenanthro[3,4-d][1,3]dioxole-5-carboxylic acid
- Other names Aristinic acid; Aristolochia yellow; Aristolochic acid A; Aristolochin;Aristolochine; Descresept; Tardolyt;TR 1736

Identifiers
CAS Number	313-67-7
3D model (JSmol)	Interactive image
ChEMBL	ChEMBL93353
ChemSpider	2149
KEGG	C08469
PubChem CID	2236
UNII	94218WFP5T
- InChI: InChI=1S/C17H11NO7/c1-23-12-4-2-3-8-9(12)5-11(18(21)22)14-10(17(19)20)6-13-16(15(8)14)25-7-24-13/h2-6H,7H2,1H3,(H,19,20) Key: BBFQZRXNYIEMAW-UHFFFAOYSA-N; InChI=1/C17H11NO7/c1-23-12-4-2-3-8-9(12)5-11(18(21)22)14-10(17(19)20)6-13-16(15(8)14)25-7-24-13/h2-6H,7H2,1H3,(H,19,20) Key: BBFQZRXNYIEMAW-UHFFFAOYAG
- SMILES: [O-][N+](=O)c1cc4c(c2c1c(C(=O)O)cc3OCOc23)cccc4OC

Properties
Chemical formula	C_{17}H_{11}NO_{7}
Molar mass	341.275 g·mol^{−1}
Appearance	yellow powder
Melting point	260 to 265 °C (500 to 509 °F; 533 to 538 K)
Solubility	Slightly soluble in most solvents.

Hazards
- Occupational safety and health (OHS/OSH)
Main hazards	carcinogenic
NFPA 704 (fire diamond)	2 1 0
- Except where otherwise noted, data are given for materials in their standard state (at 25 °C [77 °F], 100 kPa). verify (what is ?) Infobox references

Aristolochic acids (English: /əˌrɪstəˈloʊkɪk/) are a family of carcinogenic, mutagenic, and nephrotoxic phytochemicals commonly found in the flowering plant family Aristolochiaceae (birthworts). Aristolochic acid (AA) I is the most abundant one. The family Aristolochiaceae includes the genera Aristolochia (birthwort) and Asarum (wild ginger), which are both commonly used in Chinese herbal medicine. Despite the host plants having a long history of use in traditional medicine, modern clinical research suggests aristolochic acids cause kidney and liver cancer. The FDA has issued warnings regarding consumption of AA-containing supplements.

== History ==
=== Early medical uses ===
Birthwort plants, and the aristolochic acids they contain, were quite common in ancient Greek and Roman medical texts, well-established as an herb there by the fifth century BC. Birthworts appeared in Ayurvedic texts by 400 AD, and in Chinese texts later in the fifth century. In these ancient times, it was used to treat kidney and urinary problems, as well as gout, snakebites, and a variety of other ailments. It was also considered to be an effective contraceptive. In many of these cases, birthworts were just some of the many ingredients used to create ointments or salves. In the early first century, in Roman texts, Aristolochia is first mentioned as a component of oral medicines that were used to treat things such as asthma, hiccups, muscle spasms and pains, and to assist in the expulsion of afterbirth.

=== Discovery of toxicity ===
==== Kidney damage ====
Aristolochic acid poisoning was first diagnosed in the early 1990s at a clinic in Brussels, Belgium, when cases of nephritis leading to rapid kidney failure were seen in a group of women who had all taken the same weight-loss supplement, Aristolochia fangchi, which contained aristolochic acid. This nephritis was termed “Chinese herbs nephropathy” (CHN) due to the origin of the weight-loss supplement. A similar condition previously known as Balkan endemic nephropathy (BEN), first characterized in the 1950s in southeastern Europe, was later discovered to be also the result of aristolochic acid (AA) consumption. BEN is more slowly progressive than the nephritis that is seen in CHN, but is likely caused by low-level AA exposure, possibly from contamination of wheat flour seeds by a plant of the birthwort family, Aristolochia clematitis. CHN and BEN fall under the umbrella of what is now known as aristolochic acid nephropathy.

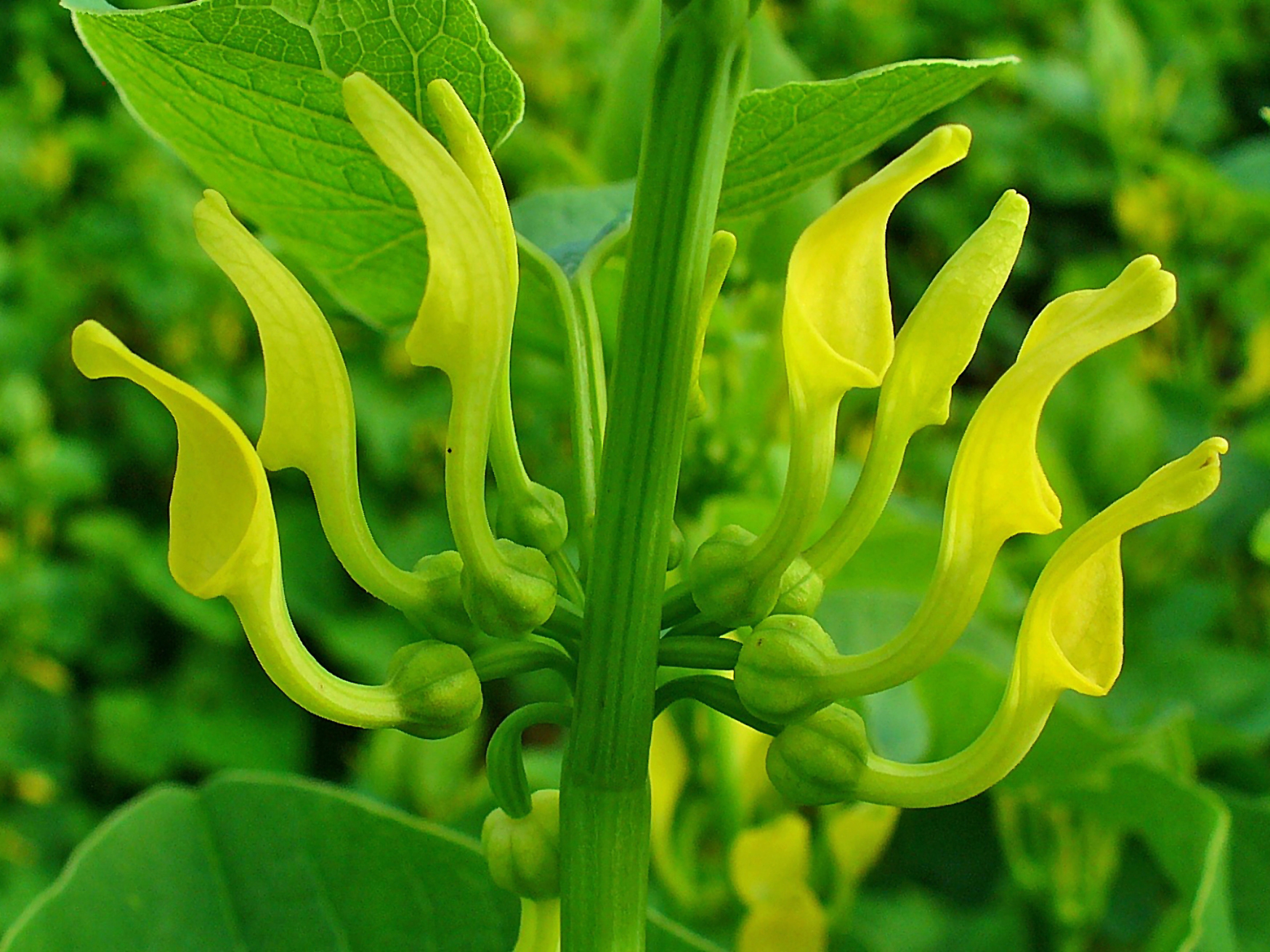
Aristolochia clematitis, the plant responsible for Balkan endemic nephropathy

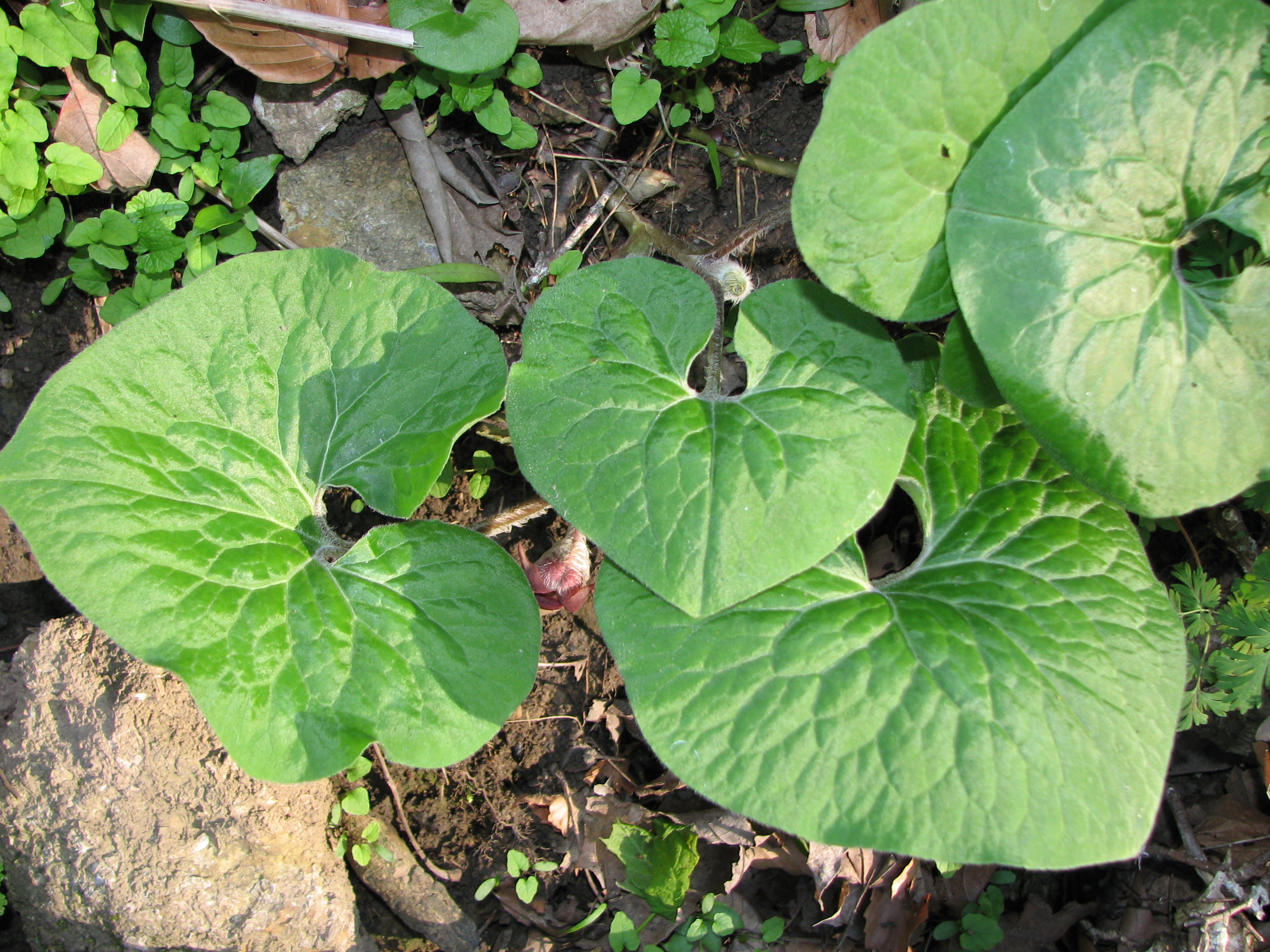
Leaves of Asarum canadense (Canadian wild ginger), a natural source of aristolochic acid.

==== Liver cancer ====
A study reported in the Science Translational Medicine journal in October 2017 reported high incidents of liver cancer in Asia, particularly Taiwan, which bore the "well-defined mutational signature" of aristolochic acids. The same link was found in Vietnam and other South-east Asian countries. This was compared with much lower rates found in Europe and North America.

== Biosynthesis ==
The major components of the "aristolochic acid" mixture are aristolochic acid I (AA-I, 12) and aristolochic acid II (AA-II). AA-I biosynthesis begins with tyrosine (2), and proceeds via norlaudanosoline (6, a hydrogenated benzylisoquinoline) and the aporphine alkaloid stephanine (11):

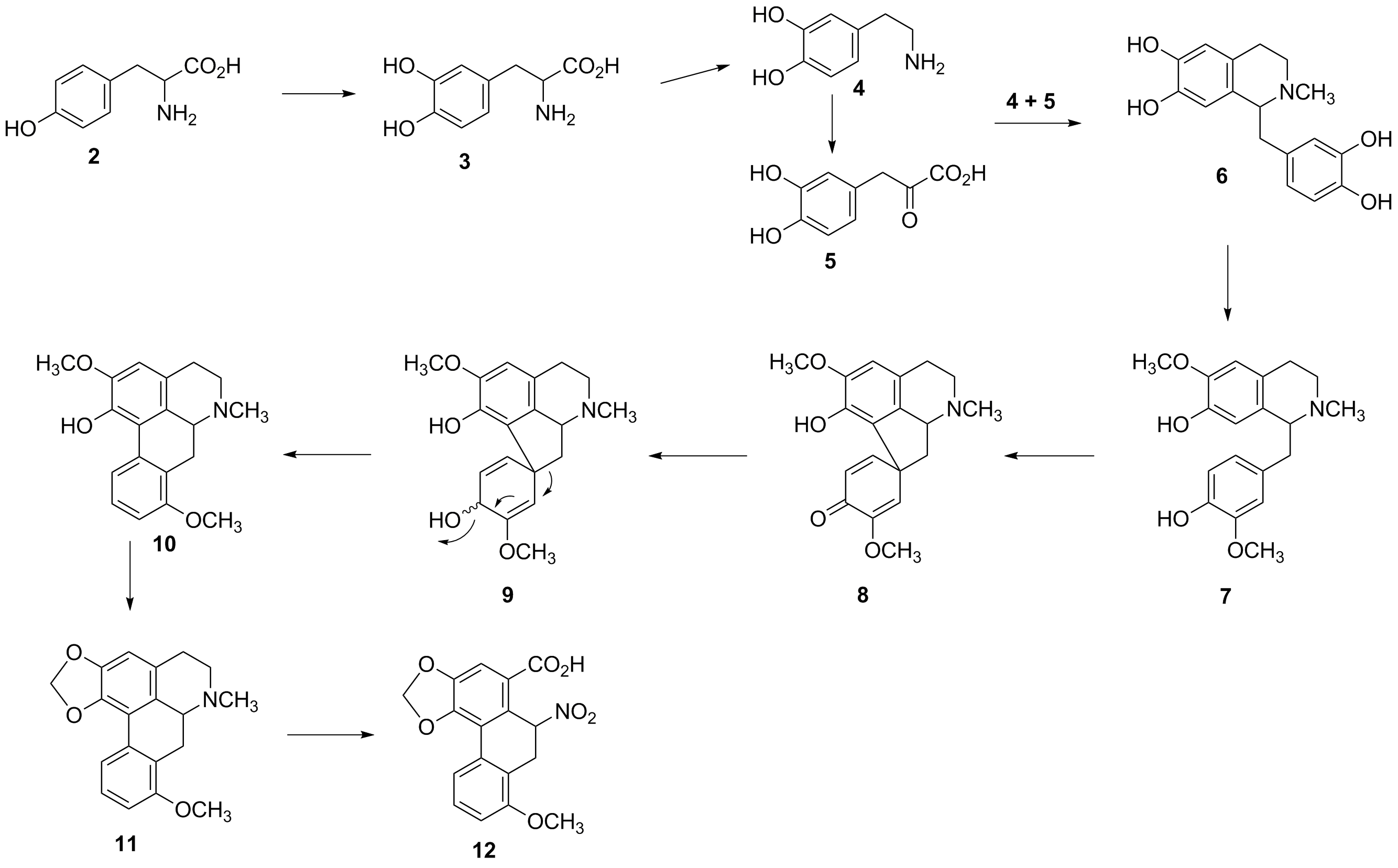
Biosynthetic pathway of aristolochic acid

The combination of an aryl carboxylic acid and an aryl nitro functionality (uncommon in natural products) suggests an apparent biogenetic relationship to the aporphines.

Isotopic labeling studies, feeding Aristolochia sipho (±)‑[3‑^{14}C, ^{15}N]-tyrosine, and isolating and degrading the resulting doubly-labeled AA-I evidences that the nitro group of AA-I originates from the amino group of tyrosine. Previous studies had already demonstrated that tyrosine is metabolized to norlaudanosoline, as follows. Tyrosine is metabolized to L-DOPA (3), and thence dopamine (4) and 3,4-dihydroxyphenylacetaldehyde (DOPAL, not shown — the decarboxylation product of 5). Norlaudanosoline synthetase then catalyzes a Pictet-Spengler-like condensation between dopamine and DOPAL.

Feeding A. sipho (±)‑[4‑^{14}C]-norlaudanosoline forms ^{14}C-labeled AA-I, and indeed the carbon atom at ring position C4 of norlaudanosoline is incorporated exclusively in the carboxylic acid moiety of AA-I. No labeled AA-I forms in the analogous experiment with [4‑^{14}C]-tetrahydropapaverine; thus biosynthesis of AA-I from norlaudanosoline must require a phenol oxidation to aporphine intermediates.

Confirmation of aporphine intermediates was obtained some two decades later through a series of feeding studies on Aristolochia bracteata using several labeled, hypothetical, benzyltetrahydroisoquinoline and aporphine precursors. (±)‑[aryl‑^{3}H]‑Prestephanine (10) and (±)‑[aryl‑^{3}H]‑stephanine (11) are incorporated into AA-I, suggesting that they are AA-I's immediate precursors. The transformation of stephanine to AA-I involves an uncommon oxidative cleavage of the B ring of the aporphine structure to give the nitro-substituted phenanthrenoic acid.

The intermediate transformation from norlaudanosine (6) to prestephanine (10) is not entirely clear, and a potential role for the cytochrome P450 enzyme CYP80G2 has been suggested, as CYP80G2 catalyzes the intramolecular C-C phenol coupling of several benzyltetrahydroisoquinolines. Certainly, feeding A. bracteata (±)‑[5′,8‑^{3}H_{2}; 6-methoxy‑^{14}C]-nororientaline generates doubly labeled AA-I; and cleavage of the AA-I methylenedioxy group demonstrates that it arose from the o‑methoxyphenol segment of the nororientaline tetrahydroisoquinoline ring. (±)‑[5′,8‑^{3}H_{2}]‑Orientaline (7) is also incorporated into AA-I, and metabolism of orientaline to prestephanine is known to occur via the proaporphines orientalinone (8) and orientalinol (9) in a Zincke-Suhl-like addition.

== Symptoms and diagnosis ==
Exposure to aristolochic acid is associated with a high incidence of uroepithelial tumorigenesis, and is linked to urothelial cancer. Since aristolochic acid is a mutagen, it does damage over time. Patients are often first diagnosed with aristolochic acid nephropathy (AAN), which is a rapidly progressive nephropathy and puts them at risk for renal failure and urothelial cancer. However, urothelial cancer is only observed long after consumption. One study estimated, on average, detectable cancer develops ten years from the start of daily aristolochic acid consumption.

A patient thought to have AAN can be confirmed through phytochemical analysis of plant products consumed and detection of aristolactam DNA adducts in the renal cells. (Aristolochic acid is metabolised into aristolactam.) Additionally, mutated proteins in renal cancers as a result of transversion of A:T pairings to T:A are characteristically seen in aristolochic acid-induced mutations. In some cases, early detection resulting in cessation of aristolochia-product consumption can lead to reverse of the kidney damage.

== Pharmacology ==
=== Absorption, distribution, metabolism, and excretion ===
Aristolactam I has R1=R2=H, R3=OMe; several other related natural products with R groups of H, OH or OMe are known

Once orally ingested, aristolochic acid I is absorbed through the gastrointestinal tract into the blood stream. Aristolochic acids are metabolized by oxidation and reduction pathways, or phase I metabolism. Reduction of aristolochic acid I produces aristolactam I, which has been observed in the urine. Further processing of aristolactam I by O-demethylation results in aristolactam Ia, the primary metabolite. Additionally, nitroreduction results in an N-acylnitrenium ion, which can form DNA-base adducts, thus giving aristolochic acid I its mutagenic properties.

Aristolactam I-DNA adducts have been detected in patient biopsy samples taken 20 years after exposure to plants containing aristolochic acid.

Aristolochic acids and their metabolites are excreted through the urine.

=== Mechanism of action ===
The mechanism of action of aristolochic acid is uncertain, especially in regards to nephropathy. The carcinogenic effects of aristolochic acids are thought to be a result of mutation of the tumor suppressor gene TP53, which seems to be unique to aristolochic acid-associated carcinogenesis. Nephropathy caused by aristolochic acid consumption is not mechanistically understood, but DNA adducts characteristic of aristolochic acid-induced mutations are found in the kidneys of AAN patients, indicating these might play a role.

== Regulation ==
In April 2001, the U.S. Food and Drug Administration issued a consumer health alert warning against consuming botanical products, sold as "traditional medicines" or as ingredients in dietary supplements, containing aristolochic acid. The agency warned that consumption of aristolochic acid-containing products was associated with "permanent kidney damage, sometimes resulting in kidney failure that has required kidney dialysis or kidney transplantation. In addition, some patients have developed certain types of cancers, most often occurring in the urinary tract."

In August 2013, two studies identified an aristolochic acid mutational signature in upper urinary tract cancer patients from Taiwan. The carcinogenic effect is the most potent found thus far, exceeding the amount of mutations in smoking-induced lung cancer and UV-exposed melanoma. Exposure to aristolochic acid may also cause certain types of liver cancer.

== See also ==
- List of herbs with known adverse effects
- Piperolactam A
- Stephania tetrandra
