= Tetrahydropapaveroline =

Names
- IUPAC name 1-[(3,4-dihydroxyphenyl)methyl]-1,2,3,4-tetrahydroisoquinoline-6,7-diol
- Other names Norlaudanosoline; Tetrahydroxypapaveroline

Identifiers
CAS Number	4747-99-3
3D model (JSmol)	Interactive image
Beilstein Reference	313061
ChEBI	CHEBI:28770
ChEMBL	ChEMBL19068
ChemSpider	17491
ECHA InfoCard	100.158.898
EC Number	630-581-1
KEGG	C06350
PubChem CID	18519
UNII	V1EWJ6B8KY
CompTox Dashboard (EPA)	DTXSID70963850
- InChI: InChI=1S/C16H17NO4/c18-13-2-1-9(6-14(13)19)5-12-11-8-16(21)15(20)7-10(11)3-4-17-12/h1-2,6-8,12,17-21H,3-5H2 Key: ABXZOXDTHTTZJW-UHFFFAOYSA-N
- SMILES: C1CNC(C2=CC(=C(C=C21)O)O)CC3=CC(=C(C=C3)O)O

Properties
Chemical formula	C_{16}H_{17}NO_{4}
Molar mass	287.315 g·mol^{−1}

Hazards
- GHS labelling
Pictograms	(GHS07: Exclamation mark)
Signal word	Warning
Hazard statements	H302
Precautionary statements	P264, P270, P301+P317, P330, P501
- Except where otherwise noted, data are given for materials in their standard state (at 25 °C [77 °F], 100 kPa). Infobox references

Tetrahydropapaveroline, also known as norlaudanosoline, is a tetrahydroisoquinoline alkaloid. It is also classified as a benzylisoquinoline alkaloids.

== Brain biochemistry ==
Tetrahydropapaveroline is relevant to brain pathologies.

It can be formed in trace amounts in the brain by a condensation reaction of dopamine and dopaldehyde (a metabolite of dopamine).

It inhibits dopamine uptake within the cerebral cortex.
