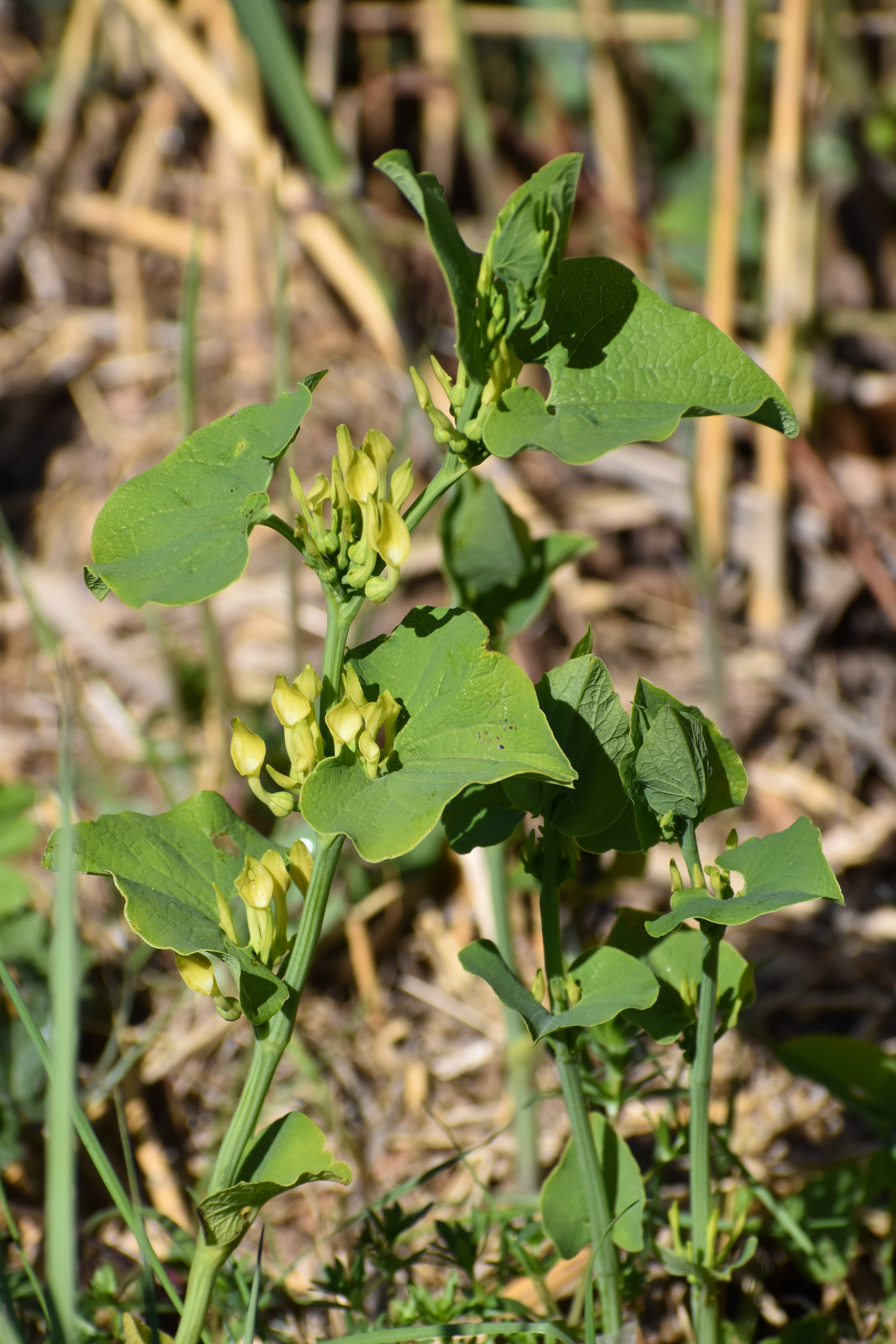
- Aristolochia clematitis at Azille, Aude, France

Scientific classification
- Kingdom: Plantae
- Clade: Tracheophytes
- Clade: Angiosperms
- Clade: Magnoliids
- Order: Piperales
- Family: Aristolochiaceae
- Genus: Aristolochia
- Species: A. clematitis

Binomial name
- Aristolochia clematitis L.

= Aristolochia clematitis =

Species of plant

Aristolochia clematitis, or European birthwort, is a twining herbaceous plant in the family Aristolochiaceae, which is native to most of central and southern Europe and parts of western Asia, and naturalised further north in Europe.

== Description ==
It is a herbaceous scrambling or trailing rhizomatous perennial plant growing to 80 cm long. The leaves are heart-shaped, with a distinct petiole. The flowers are 2–3 cm long, pale yellow, tubular, with a broad lip at the top. The fruit is an oval capsule. All parts of the plant have a very strong unpleasant smell. The plant seeks light by ascending the stems of surrounding plants.

== Toxicity ==
Formerly used to assist parturition, hence its name, it is now thought to be the cause of thousands of kidney failure cases in Romania, Bulgaria, Serbia, Bosnia and Herzegovina and Croatia. The initial hypothesis that seeds from the plant were unintentionally consumed through contaminated flour has come to be questioned. Urinary tract malignancies among those who have consumed the plant are also reported. The link between kidney failure and aristolochic acid, which the plant contains, was discovered after a clinic for obesity in Belgium used herbal products based on another plant of the same genus as a diuretic. After a few months, some of the patients experienced kidney failure.

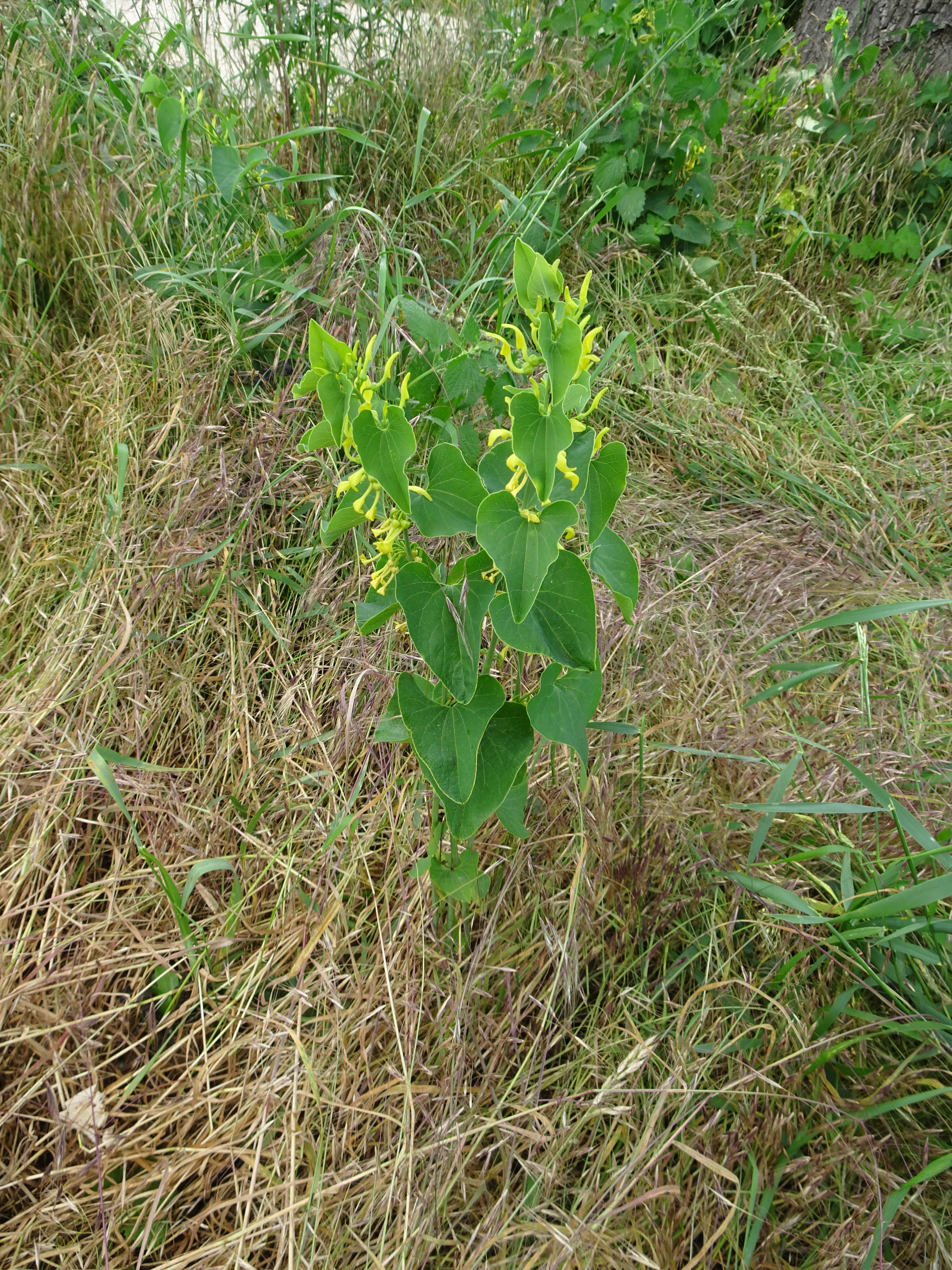
Plant at Podivín, Czech Republic

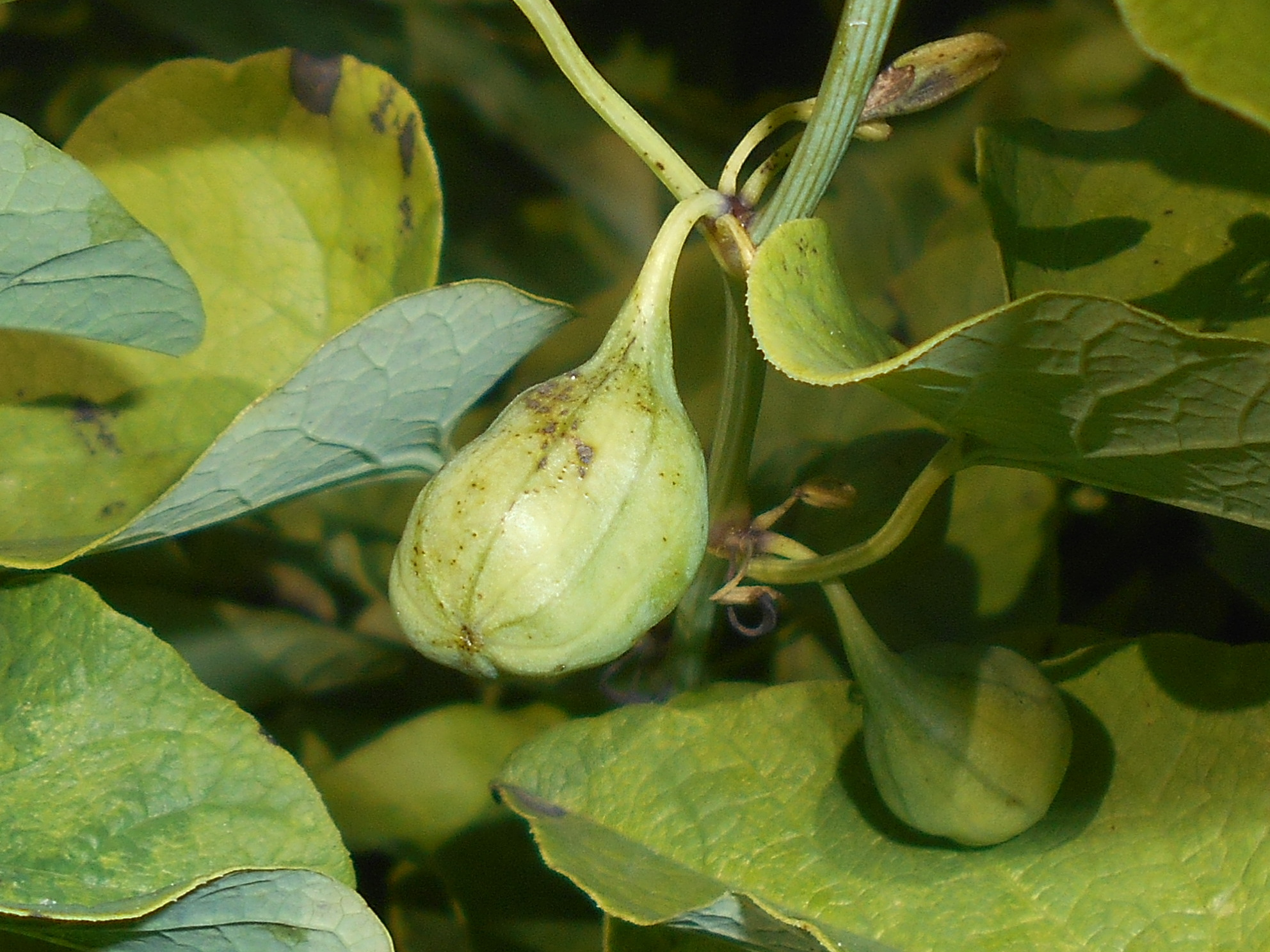
Fruit

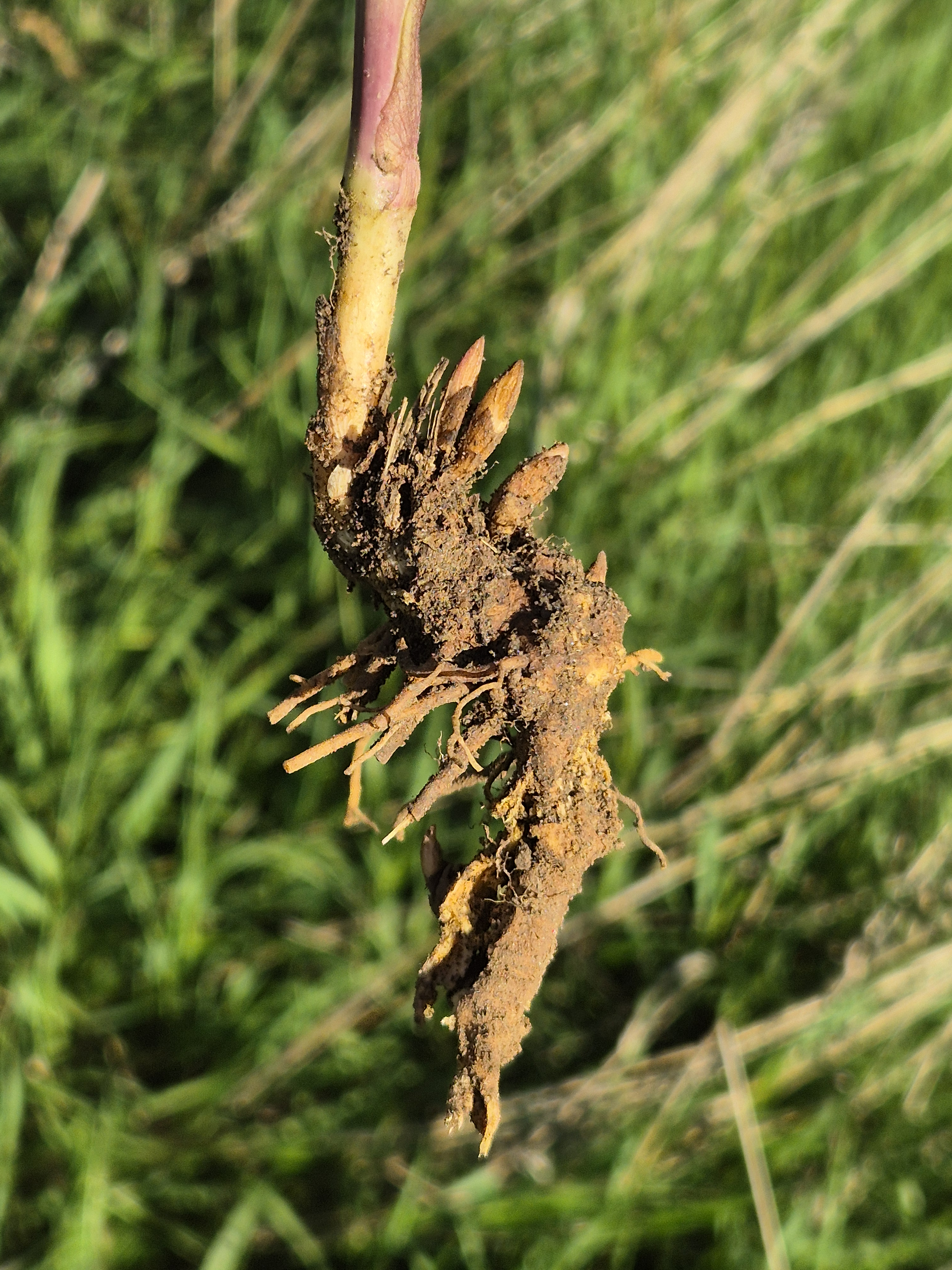
Rhizome with stem and stem buds, Hollabrunn, Lower Austria

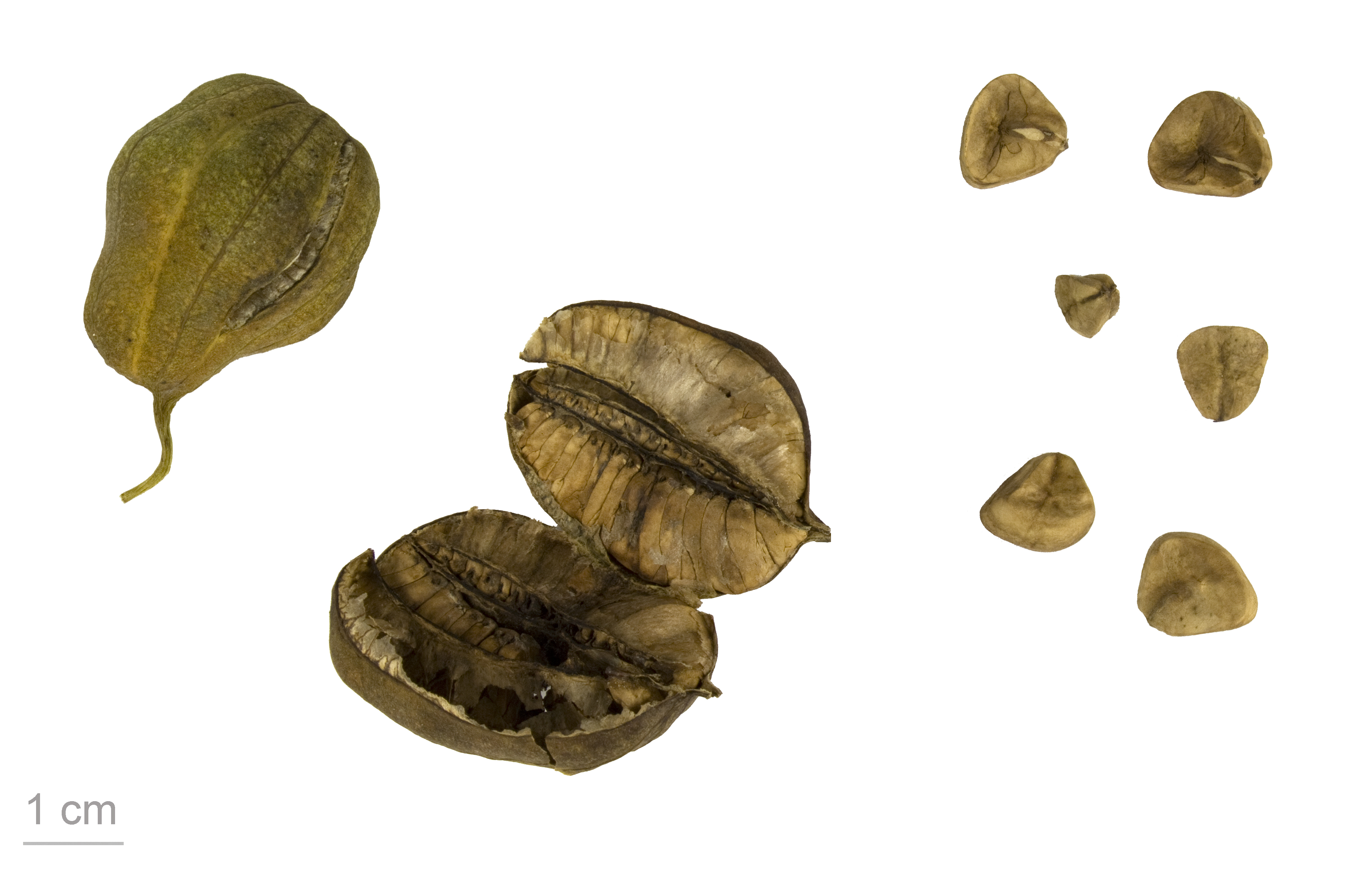
Fruit and seeds (herbarium specimen)

== See also ==
- Balkan nephropathy
