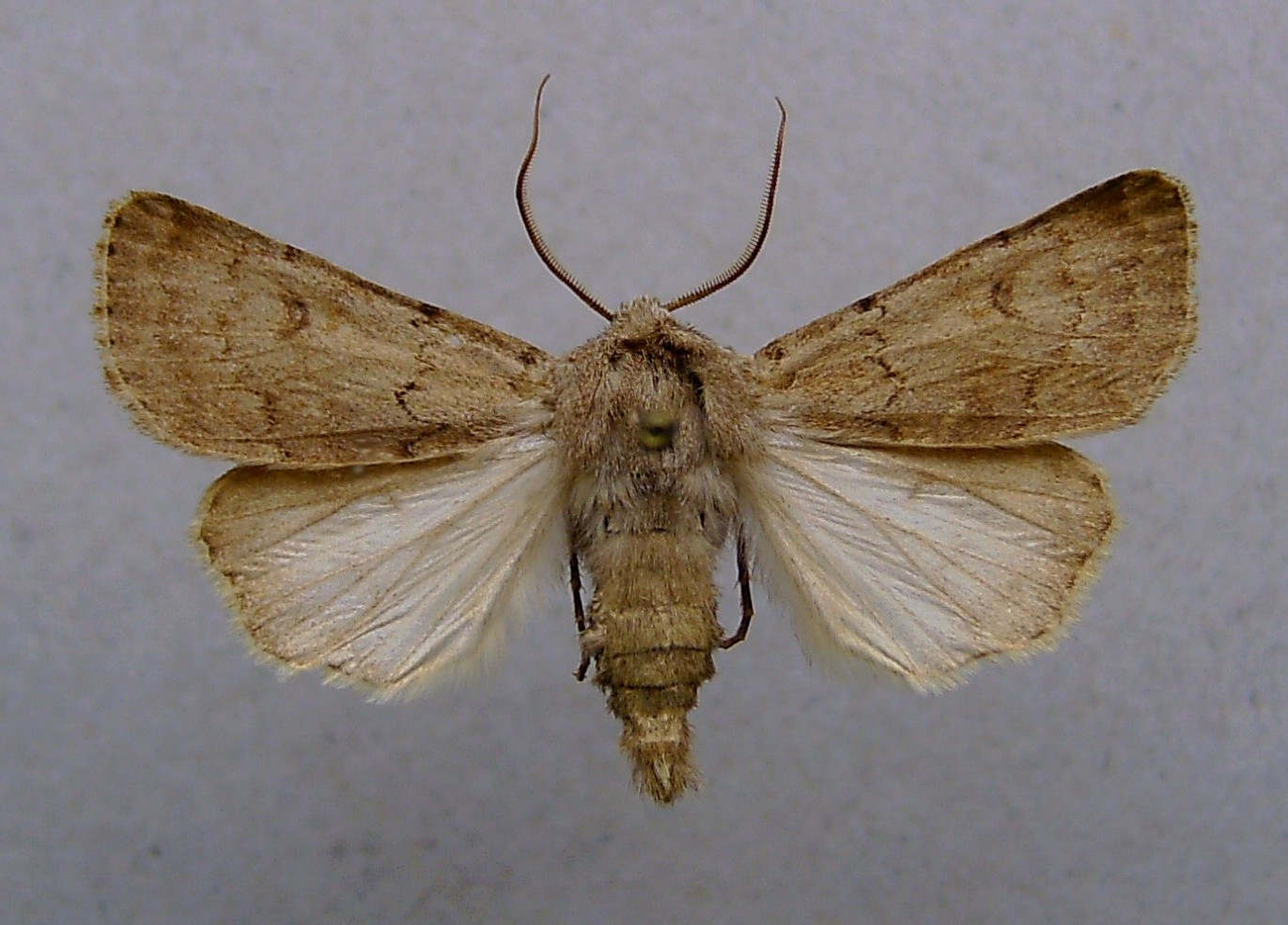

Conservation status
- Least Concern (IUCN 3.1) (Europe regional assessment)

Scientific classification
- Kingdom: Animalia
- Phylum: Arthropoda
- Clade: Pancrustacea
- Class: Insecta
- Order: Lepidoptera
- Superfamily: Noctuoidea
- Family: Noctuidae
- Genus: Agrotis
- Species: A. cinerea

Binomial name
- Agrotis cinerea (Denis & Schiffermüller, 1775)

Synonyms
- Phalaena cinerea; Orthosia murina; Euxoa cinerea; Euxoa tephrina

= Agrotis cinerea =

Light feathered rustic

Species of moth

Agrotis cinerea, the light feathered rustic, is a moth of the family Noctuidae. The species was first described by Michael Denis and Ignaz Schiffermüller in 1775. It is found in southern and central Europe, northern Turkey, the Caucasus, western Turkmenia and Central Asia.

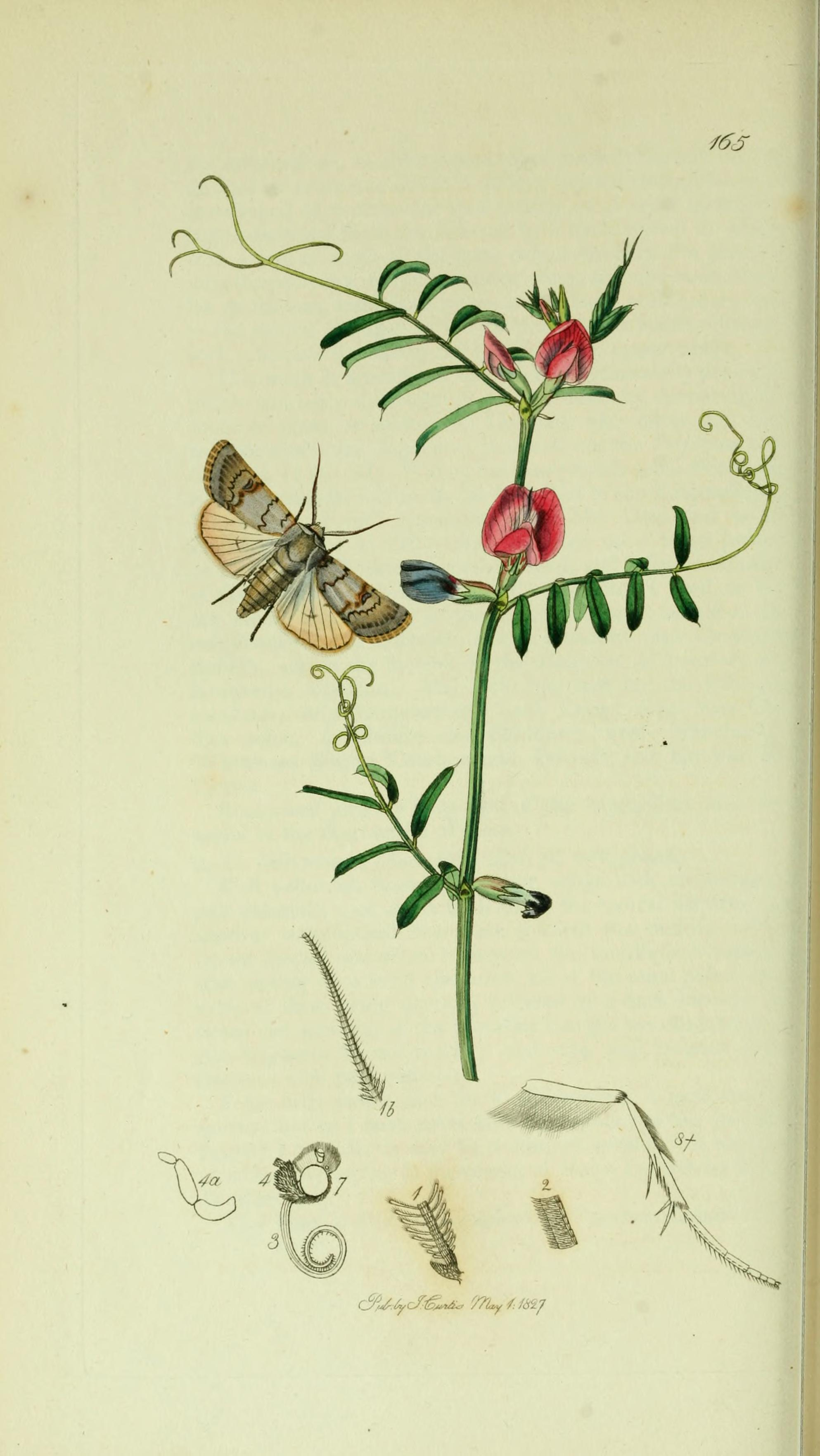
Illustration from John Curtis's British Entomology Volume 5

The wingspan is 33–40 mm. The forewing is ashy grey, with darker irroration (sprinkling): the claviform and orbicular stigmata are obsolete: reniform a small dark lunule; a distinct diffuse dark median shade: hindwing whitish, in the female grey-tinged. In the ab. alpigena Tur. the wings are paler and the markings indistinct, while in ab. livonica Teich they are darker. — ab. fusca Bsd., is larger than the typical form, and black brown; — subsp. tephrina Stgr. is smaller, with forewing narrower, and the markings much clearer; this form is confined to the south of England. Tutt, writing in 1892, evidently viewing only British specimens, did not notice that the British race was per se distinct from continental forms. The aberrations which he identified apply solely to the British race. These are ab. pallida Tutt, pale grey without median shade and all males; — ab. obscura Tutt nec Hbn. A unicolored dull brown form is generally (but not always) confined to females; and ab. virgata Tutt pale grey exhibits a distinct reddish median shade, and all males.

Adults are on the wing from May to June. They are active day and night and can be found near flowers, such as Berberis vulgaris.

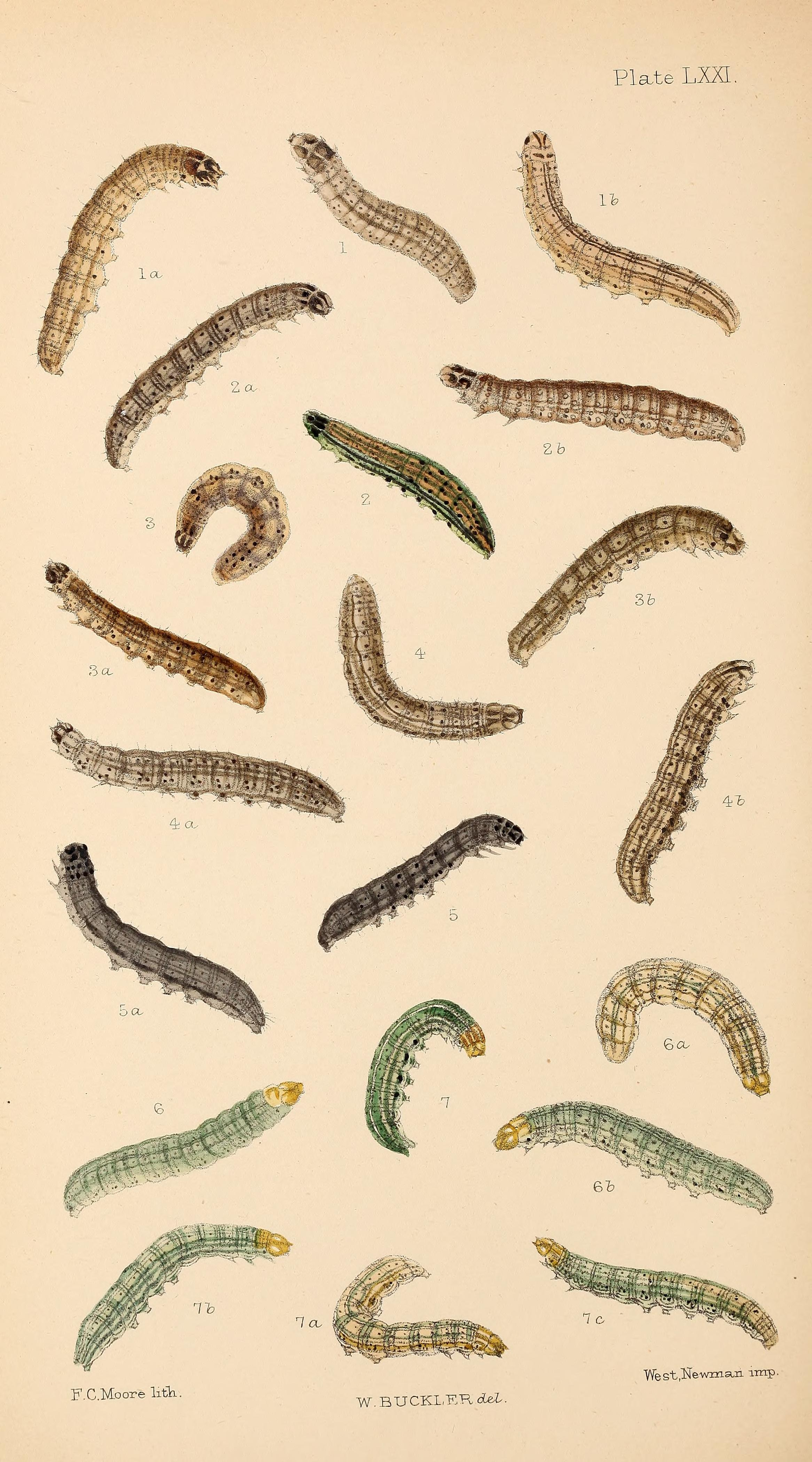
Figs 5 and 5a: larva after the last moult

The yellowish-white egg has an indistinctly ribbed surface. Adult caterpillars are mostly earth-grey and are well-adapted to their surroundings. They have indistinct, dark lines and stripes on the dorsum and sides. Black point warts stand out. The reddish-brown pupa is characterized by a comb-like cremaster with two short thorns. The larvae feed on the roots and leaves of low-growing herbaceous plants and grasses, including Thymus praecox, Stellaria media, Medicago sativa, Rumex and Taraxacum.

== Similar species ==
- Agrotis simplonia
- Euxoa birivia
- Euxoa decora
- Rhyacia helvetina
- Epipsilia grisescens
- Xestia ashworthii ssp. candelarum
