= C37H40N2O6 =

The molecular formula C_{37}H_{40}N_{2}O_{6} (molar mass: 608.723 g/mol, exact mass: 608.2886 u) may refer to:

- Berbamine
- Fangchinoline
