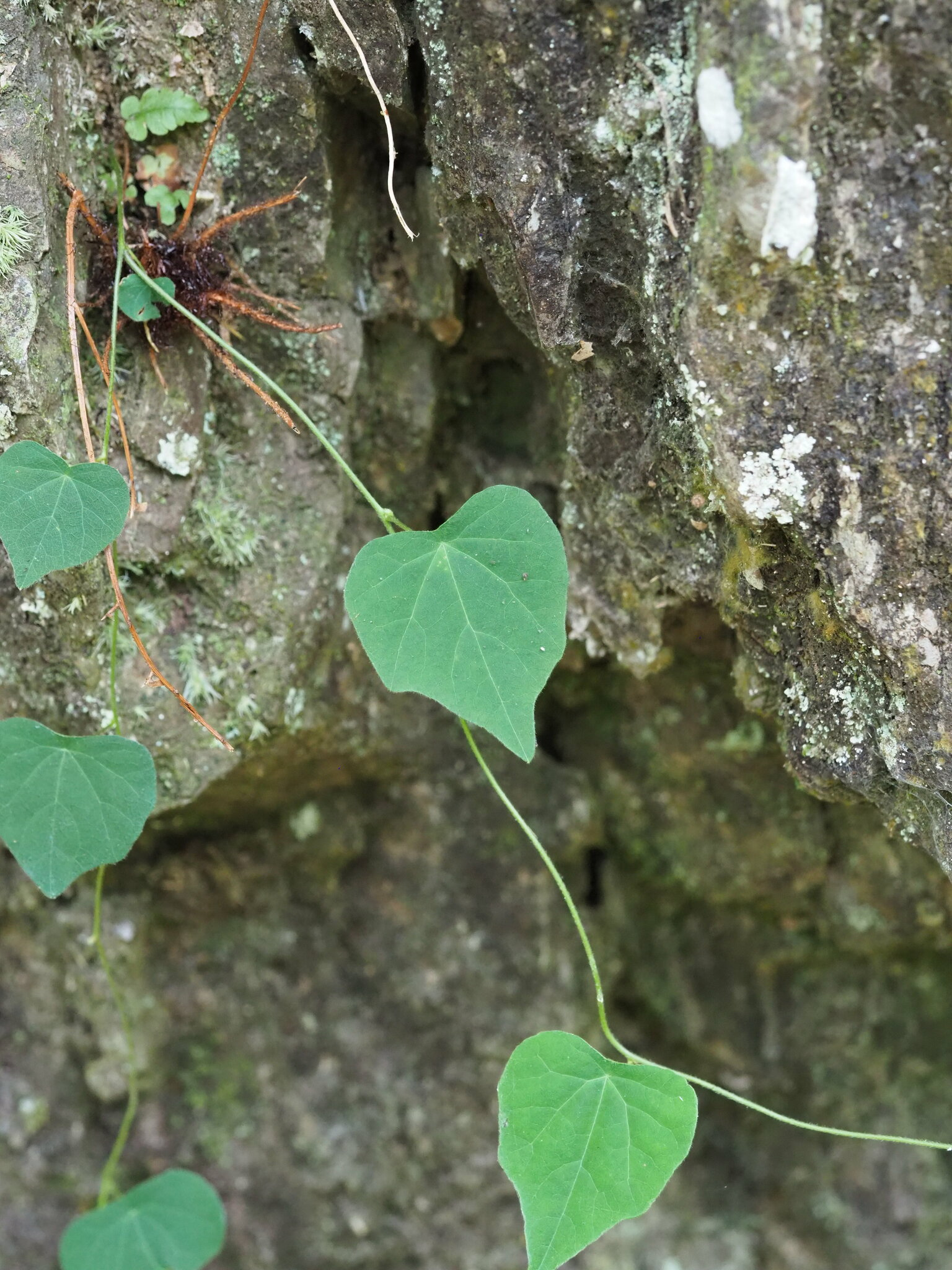

Scientific classification
- Kingdom: Plantae
- Clade: Embryophytes
- Clade: Tracheophytes
- Clade: Angiosperms
- Clade: Eudicots
- Order: Ranunculales
- Family: Menispermaceae
- Genus: Botryodiscia (Lour.) Lian Lian & Wei Wang
- Species: B. tetrandra

Binomial name
- Botryodiscia tetrandra (S.Moore) L.Lian & Wei Wang

Synonyms
- Stephania tetrandra S.Moore

= Botryodiscia =

Species of plant

Botryodiscia is a genus of flowering plants in the family Menispermaceae. It includes a single species, Botryodiscia tetrandra, is a herbaceous perennial vine or scrambling subshrub native to southern China, Hainan, Taiwan, and Vietnam. It grows from a short, woody caudex, climbing to a height of around three meters. The leaves are arranged spirally on the stem, and are peltate, i.e. with the leaf petiole attached near the centre of the leaf. Its root is used in traditional Chinese medicine (TCM).

The species was first described as Stephania tetrandra by Spencer Le Marchant Moore in 1875. In 2024 Lian Lian and Wei Wang placed it in the newly described monotypic genus Botryodiscia as Botryodiscia tetrandra.

== Distribution and habitat ==
Botryodiscia tetrandra occurs in shrublands at village margins, open fields, and roadsides in South Central and East China in Anhui, Fujian, Guangdong, Guangxi, Hainan, Hubei, Hunan, Jiangxi, and Zhejiang provinces, in Taiwan, and in Vietnam.

== Etymology in Chinese medicine ==
Botryodiscia tetrandra is among the 50 fundamental herbs used in TCM. The standard pinyin according to the Chinese [Herbal] Pharmacopia of the People's Republic of China (Chinese: 中华人民共和国药典; pinyin: Zhonghua Renmin Gongheguo Yao Dian) is: fen fang ji (Chinese: 粉防己; pinyin: fěn fáng jǐ), but it is more commonly known as Han Fang ji (Chinese: 漢防己; pinyin: hàn fáng jǐ).

== Traditional medicine ==
Fen fang ji is used in traditional Chinese medicine to dispel wind and dampness to relieve pain and to promote diuresis. It is classified as acrid, bitter and cold. The part used is the root.

== Chemistry ==
Botryodiscia contains tetrandrine, a potent smooth muscle relaxant. Stephania alkaloids have curare-like action, and can selectively inhibit T-cell-dependent immune reactions. The root contains many isoquinoline alkaloids: tetrandrine (0.6-0.9%), fangchinoline (0.5%), cyclanoline (0.1%) and dimethyltetrandrine iodide (muscle relaxant). The root also contains flavanoids. The main active alkaloids are: tetrandrine (12 to 23 grams/kg) and fangchinoline (0.3–3 mg/kg). Also present are: dimethyltetradine iodide, cyclanoline, menisine, menisidine, oxofangchirine, stephenanthrine, stepholidine and bisbenzylisoquinoline. Fenfangjines F, G, H, and I. Modern pharmacological research has also examined the plant in the context of traditional Chinese medical use. A 2026 study analyzed more than 41,000 historical Chinese medical recipes and combined this dataset with nuclear receptor profiling, identifying fractions of Botryodiscia tetrandra (studied under its former name Stephania tetrandra) that modulate glucocorticoid receptor activity.

== Other herbs sometimes used as Fang Ji ==
Other plants named fang ji (Chinese: 防己, roughly "snakebite remedy") are sometimes substituted for it. Notable among these is guang fang ji (Chinese: 廣防己; pinyin: guǎng fáng jǐ), Aristolochia fanchi, whose main toxic component is aristolochic acid, a potent carcinogen and nephrotoxin. Other herbs sometimes used as Fang Ji include Cocculus trilobus, C. orbiculatus, Aristolochia fangchi, and Sinomenium acutum (Japanese Han Fang Ji or Qinfengteng).

== Warnings, contraindications for substituted herbs ==
When Aristolochia fanghi is substituted for Botryodiscia tetrandra, the resultant guang fang ji preparations can contain toxic amounts of aristolochic acid Ingestion can lead to renal failure and even death; Aristolochia is used in TCM only with great caution. In May, 2000, the FDA began detaining any plants or medicines suspected of containing aristolochic acid, unless laboratory testing indicated they were negative for aristolochic acid. The traditional route of ingestion of guang fang ji is via water decoction. Since aristolochic acid has low water solubility, water decoction is believed to be a safer route than taking guang fang ji as an uncooked powder.
