= Tetrandrine =

Names
- IUPAC name 9,20,21,25-tetramethoxy-15,30-dimethyl-7,23-dioxa-15,30-diazaheptacyclo[22.6.2.2^{3,6}.1^{8,12}.1^{14,18}.0^{27,31}.0^{22,33}]hexatriaconta-3,5,8(34),9,11,18,20,22(33),24(32),25,27(31),35-dodecaene

Identifiers
CAS Number	518-34-3
3D model (JSmol)	Interactive image
ChEBI	CHEBI:49
ChEMBL	ChEMBL176045
ChemSpider	4479515
DrugBank	DB14066
ECHA InfoCard	100.208.615
EC Number	683-095-7
KEGG	C09654
PubChem CID	73078
UNII	29EX23D5AJ
CompTox Dashboard (EPA)	DTXSID10178062
- InChI: InChI=1S/C38H42N2O6/c1-39-15-13-25-20-32(42-4)34-22-28(25)29(39)17-23-7-10-27(11-8-23)45-33-19-24(9-12-31(33)41-3)18-30-36-26(14-16-40(30)2)21-35(43-5)37(44-6)38(36)46-34/h7-12,19-22,29-30H,13-18H2,1-6H3/t29-,30-/m0/s1 Key: WVTKBKWTSCPRNU-KYJUHHDHSA-N
- SMILES: CN1CCC2=CC(=C3C=C2C1CC4=CC=C(C=C4)OC5=C(C=CC(=C5)CC6C7=C(O3)C(=C(C=C7CCN6C)OC)OC)OC)OC

Properties
Chemical formula	C_{38}H_{42}N_{2}O_{6}
Molar mass	622.74988

Hazards
- GHS labelling
Pictograms	(GHS06: Toxic)
Signal word	Danger
Hazard statements	H300
Precautionary statements	P264, P270, P301+P316, P301+P317, P321, P330, P405, P501
- Except where otherwise noted, data are given for materials in their standard state (at 25 °C [77 °F], 100 kPa). verify (what is ?) Infobox references

Tetrandrine, a bis-benzylisoquinoline alkaloid, is a calcium channel blocker. It is isolated from the plant Stephania tetrandra, and other Chinese and Japanese herbs.

== Pharmacology ==
It has anti-inflammatory, immunologic and antiallergenic effects. It inhibits the degranulation of mast cells. It has a quinidine-like anti-arrhythmic effect. It has vasodilatory properties and can therefore reduce blood pressure. Tetrandrine may have potential use for the treatment of liver disease and liver cancer. Tetrandrine has potential therapeutic value to prevent excess scarring/fibrosis in conjunctiva following trabeculectomy or in patients with severe conjunctival inflammation. Tetrandrine has anti-inflammatory and anti-fibrogenic actions, which make tetrandrine and related compounds potentially useful in the treatment of lung silicosis, liver cirrhosis, and rheumatoid arthritis. Tetrandrine has also been shown to inhibit entry of Ebola virus into host cells in vitro and showed therapeutic efficacy against Ebola in preliminary studies on mice. Tetrandrine has also been studied and patented as a possible treatment for tinnitus.

== Biosynthesis ==
Tetrandrine is biosynthesized from a free radical coupled dimerization of S-N-methylcoclaurine:

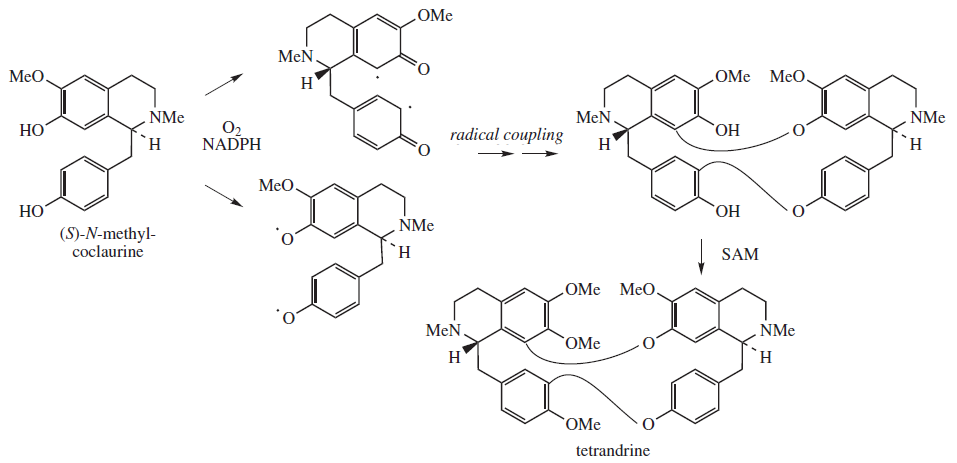

== Synonyms ==
Synonyms include fanchinine, hanfangchin A, NSC 77037, (S,S)-(+)-tetrandrine, sinomenine A, TTD, tetrandrin, d-tetrandrine, and GW-201.
