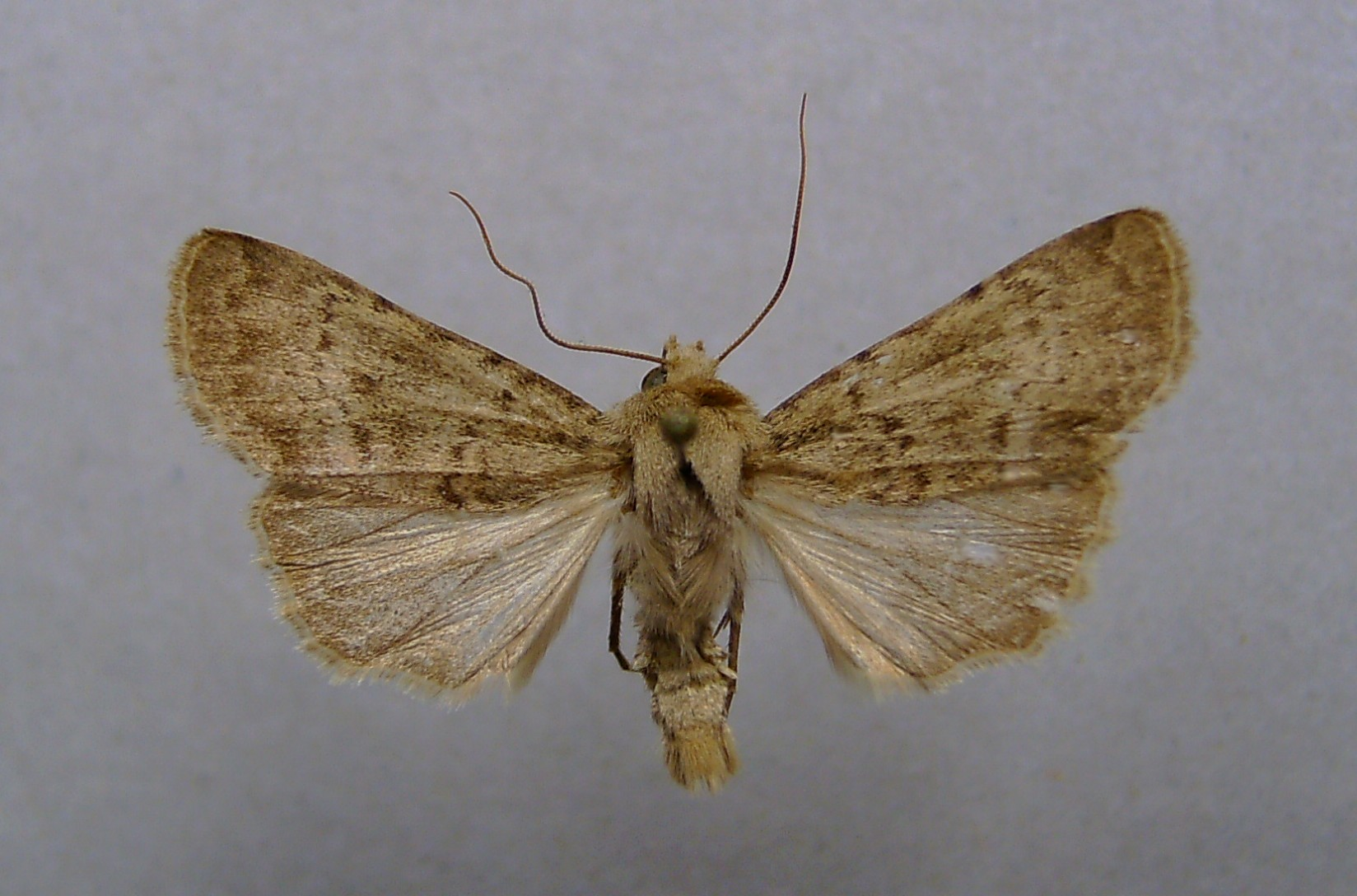
- Epipsilia latens

Scientific classification
- Kingdom: Animalia
- Phylum: Arthropoda
- Clade: Pancrustacea
- Class: Insecta
- Order: Lepidoptera
- Superfamily: Noctuoidea
- Family: Noctuidae
- Subfamily: Noctuinae
- Genus: Epipsilia; Hübner, 1821

= Epipsilia =

Genus of moths

Epipsilia is a genus of moths of the family Noctuidae.

== Species ==
- Epipsilia cervantes (Reisser, 1935)
- Epipsilia grisescens (Fabricius, 1794)
- Epipsilia latens (Hübner, [1809])
