= Aristolochia fangchi =

Scientific classification
- Kingdom: Plantae
- Clade: Embryophytes
- Clade: Tracheophytes
- Clade: Spermatophytes
- Clade: Angiosperms
- Clade: Magnoliids
- Order: Piperales
- Family: Aristolochiaceae
- Genus: Aristolochia
- Species: A. fangchi

Binomial name
- Aristolochia fangchi Y.C.Wu ex L.D.Chow & S.M.Hwang

Synonyms
- Isotrema fangchi (Y.C.Wu ex L.D.Chow & S.M.Hwang) X.X.Zhu, S.Liao & J.S.Ma

Species of flowering plant

Aristolochia fangchi (Chinese: 广防已 guang fang ji), is a species of flowering plant in the family Aristolochiaceae, native to Vietnam and southeast and south-central China.

In 1993, a series of end-stage renal disease cases were reported from Belgium associated with a weight loss treatment, where Stephania tetrandra (Chinese: 粉防己 fen fang ji) in a herbal preparation was accidentally substituted with Aristolochia fangchi. More than 105 patients were identified with nephropathy following the ingestion of this preparation from the same clinic from 1990 to 1992. Many required renal transplantation or dialysis.
