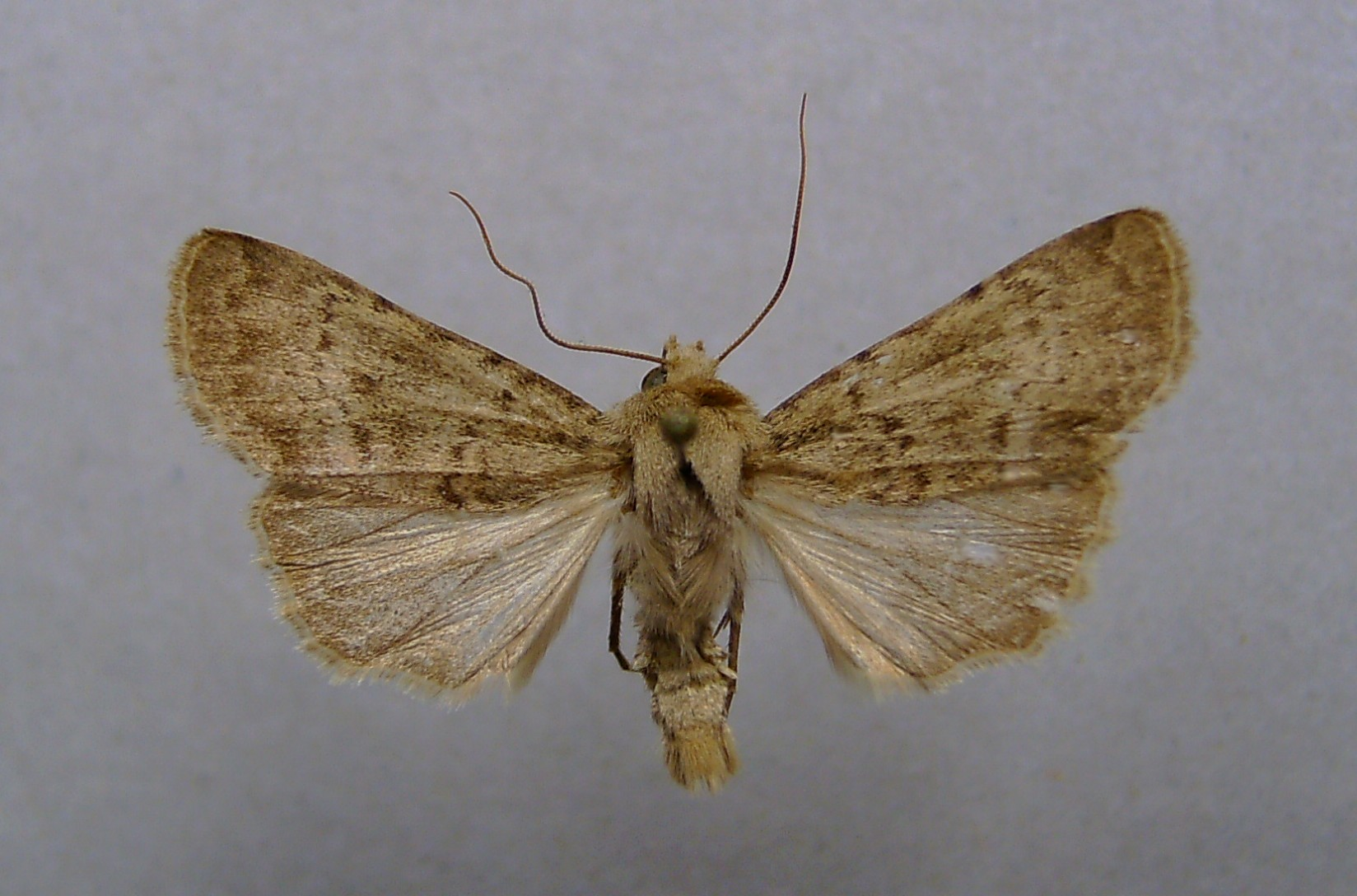
- Epipsilia latens

Scientific classification
- Domain: Eukaryota
- Kingdom: Animalia
- Phylum: Arthropoda
- Class: Insecta
- Order: Lepidoptera
- Superfamily: Noctuoidea
- Family: Noctuidae
- Genus: Epipsilia
- Species: E. latens

Binomial name
- Epipsilia latens (Hübner, [1809])

Synonyms
- Noctua latens Hübner, [1809]; Epipsilia murina Freyer, 1841; Epipsilia latitans Guenée, 1852; Epipsilia obscura Schwingenschuss, 1923; Rhyacia (Agrotis) latens f. illuminata Turati, 1919; Epipsilia apennina Sohn-Rethel, 1929; Agrotis grisescens var. hyrcana Staudinger, 1899; Epipsilia pontica Draudt, 1936

= Epipsilia latens =

Species of moth

Epipsilia latens is a moth of the family Noctuidae. It is found in central Europe, northern Spain, the Apennines, northern Iran, Turkey, Armenia and the Caucasus.

== Technical description and variation ==
The wingspan is 33–36 mm. Forewing dingy luteous grey, varying from pale to dark; in pale examples the outer and inner lines are sharply black; stigmata in all cases indistinct; hindwing of female fuscous, of male dull whitish with grey border; the veins and postmedian line grey.

== Biology ==
Adults are on wing from June to September.

Larva yellowish brown; dorsal and subdorsal lines pale, the latter bordered inwardly by a black line thickened at middle of each segment; lateral line conspicuously black; head yellowish brown, with two dark streaks. The larvae feed on Gramineae species.

== Subspecies ==
- Epipsilia latens latens (central Europe, northern Spain)
- Epipsilia latens illuminata (Apennines)
- Epipsilia latens hyrcana (northern Iran, Turkey, Armenia, Caucasus)
