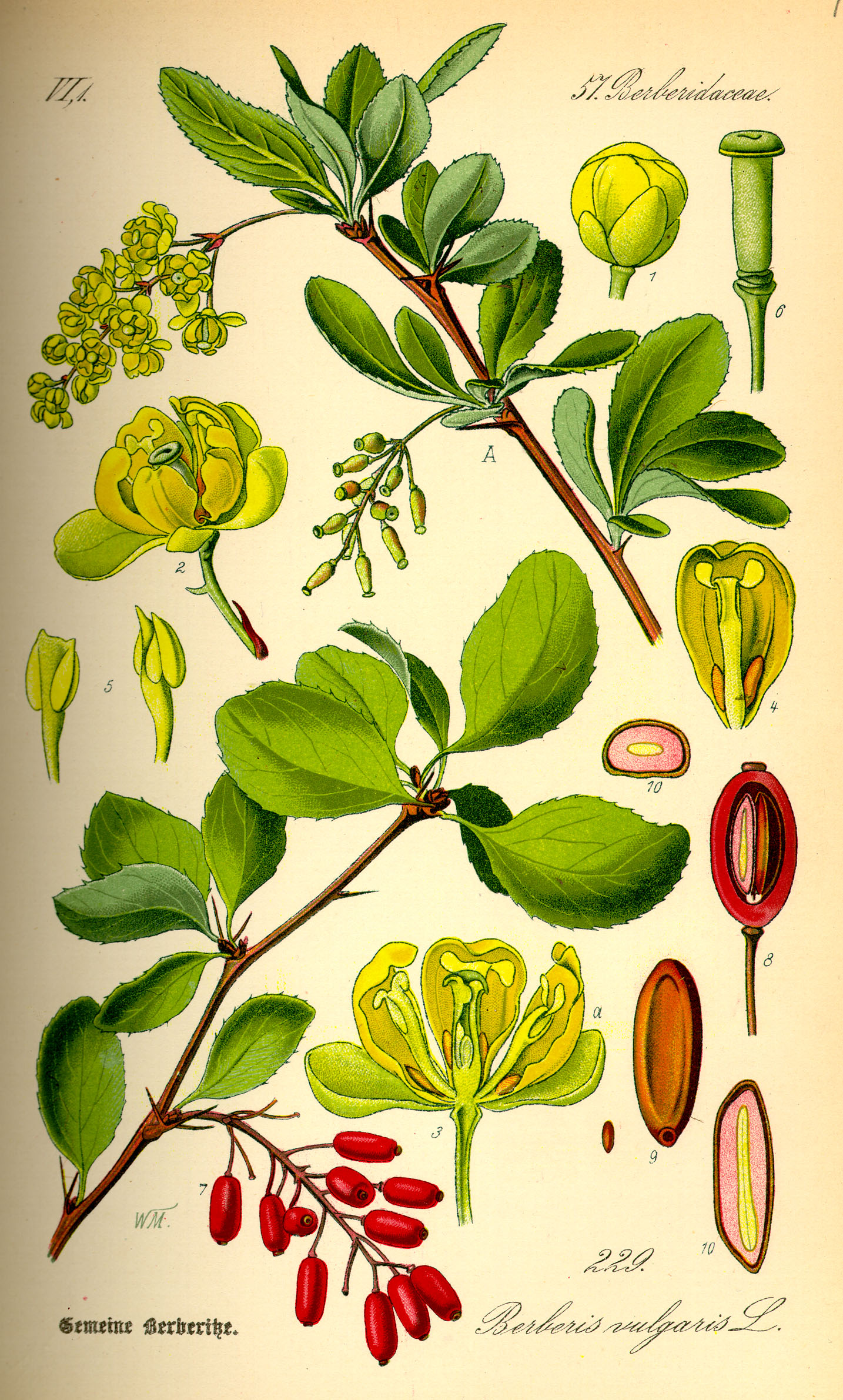
- Berberis vulgaris

Conservation status
- Least Concern (IUCN 3.1) (Europe regional assessment)

Scientific classification
- Kingdom: Plantae
- Clade: Tracheophytes
- Clade: Angiosperms
- Clade: Eudicots
- Order: Ranunculales
- Family: Berberidaceae
- Genus: Berberis
- Species: B. vulgaris

Binomial name
- Berberis vulgaris L.

Synonyms
- List: Berberis abortiva P.Renault; Berberis acida Gilib.; Berberis aethnensis Bourg. ex Willk. & Lange; Berberis alba Poit. & Turpin; Berberis angulizans G.Nicholson; Berberis apyrena K.Koch; Berberis arborescens K.Koch; Berberis articulata Loisel.; Berberis asperma Poit. & Turpin; Berberis aurea Tausch; Berberis bigelovii Schrad.; Berberis corallina G.Nicholson; Berberis dentata Tausch; Berberis dentata var. capitata Tausch; Berberis dulcis K.Koch; Berberis dumetorum Gouan; Berberis edulis K.Koch; Berberis elongata G.Nicholson; Berberis globularis G.Nicholson; Berberis hakodate Dippel; Berberis heterophylla K.Koch; Berberis iberica Sweet; Berberis innominata Kielm.; Berberis irritabilis Salisb.; Berberis jacquinii K.Koch; Berberis latifolia Poit. & Turpin; Berberis marginata K.Koch; Berberis maxima G.Nicholson; Berberis maximowiczii Regel; Berberis microphylla F.Dietr.; Berberis mitis Schrad.; Berberis nepalensis K.Koch; Berberis nitens Schrad.; Berberis obovata Schrad.; Berberis orientalis C.K.Schneid.; Berberis pangharengensis G.Nicholson; Berberis pauciflora Salisb.; Berberis racemosa Stokes; Berberis rubra Poit. & Turpin; Berberis sanguinea K.Koch; Berberis sanguinolenta K.Koch; Berberis sibirica Schult. & Schult.f.; Berberis sieboldii Dippel; Berberis sylvestris Poit. & Turpin; Berberis violacea Poit. & Turpin

= Berberis vulgaris =

Barberry

Species of shrub

Berberis vulgaris, also known as common barberry, European barberry or simply barberry, is a shrub in the genus Berberis native to the Old World. It produces edible but sharply acidic berries, which people in many countries eat as a tart and refreshing fruit.

== Description ==
It is a deciduous shrub growing up to 4 metres (13 feet) high. The leaves are small, oval, 2–5 centimetres (3/4–2 inches) long and 1–2 cm (1/2–3/4 in) broad, with a serrated margin; they are borne in clusters of 2–5 together, subtended by a three-branched spine 3–8 millimetres (1/8–5/16 in) long.

The flowers are yellow, 4–6 mm (1/8–1/4 in) across, produced on 3–6 cm (1 1/8–2 3/8 in) long panicles in late spring. The fruit is an oblong red berry 7–10 mm (1/4–3/8 in) long and 3–5 mm (1/8–3/16 in) broad, ripening in late summer or autumn. Its fruit persists for an average of 29.2 days, and bears an average of 1.3 seeds per fruit. Fruits average 76% water, and their dry weight includes 6.5% carbohydrates and 1.2% lipids.

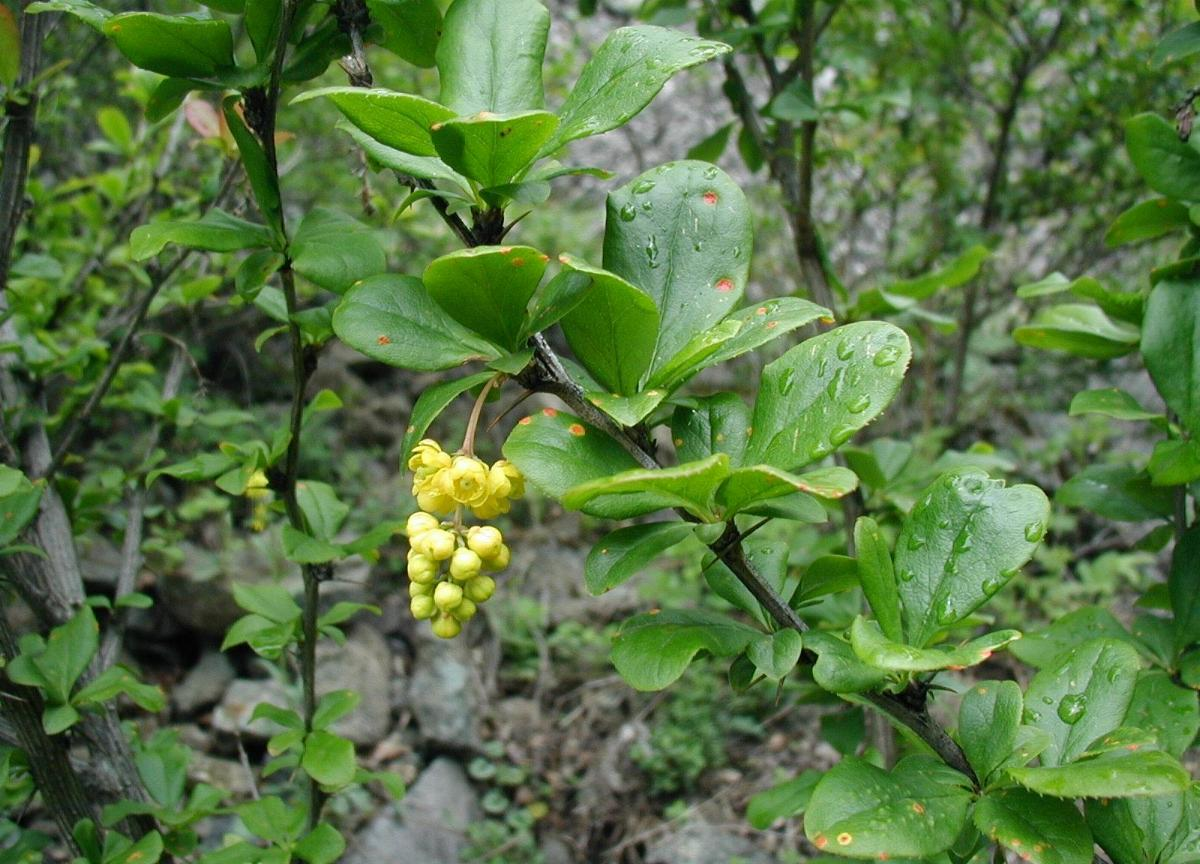
Leaves

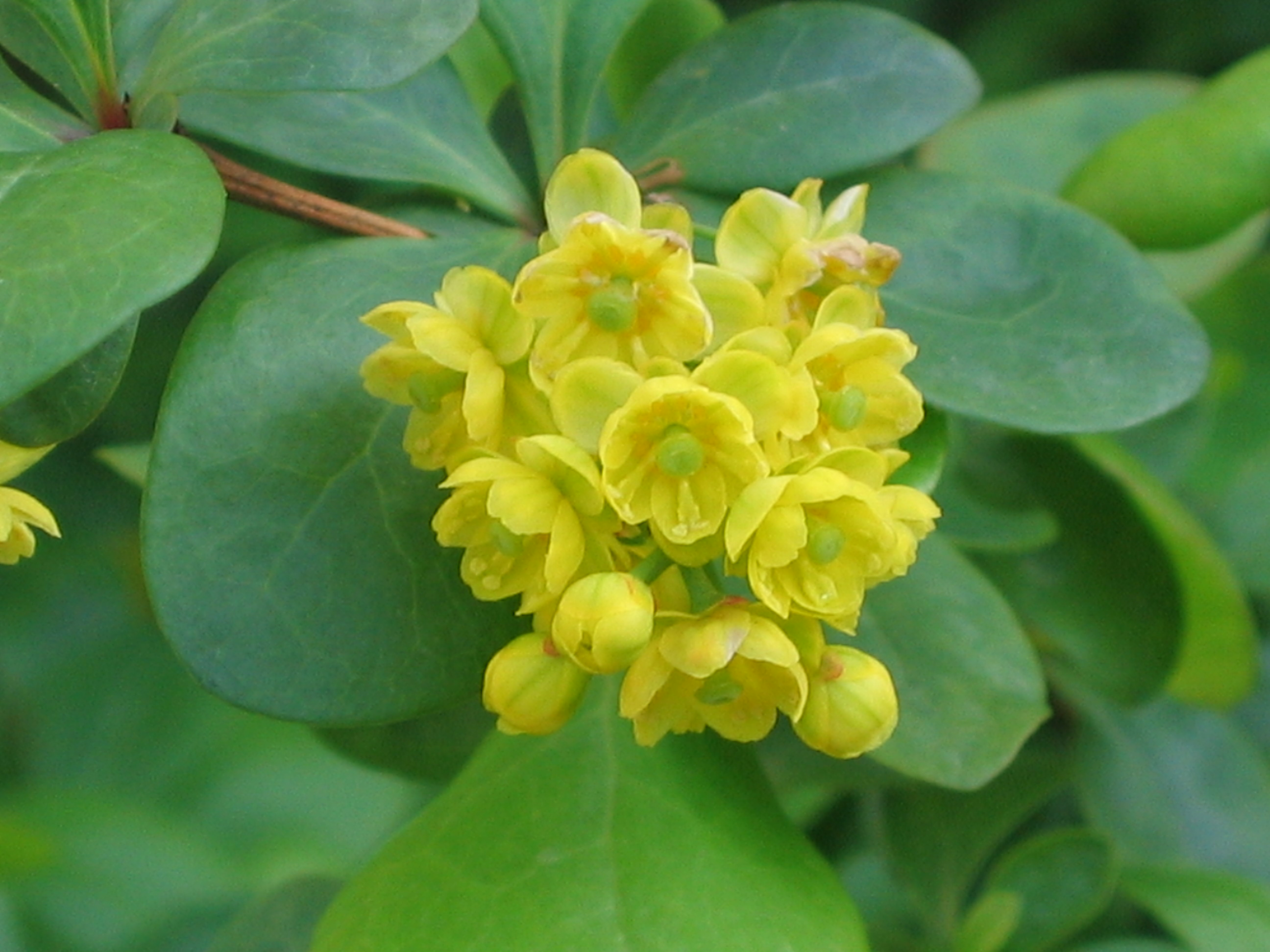
Flowers

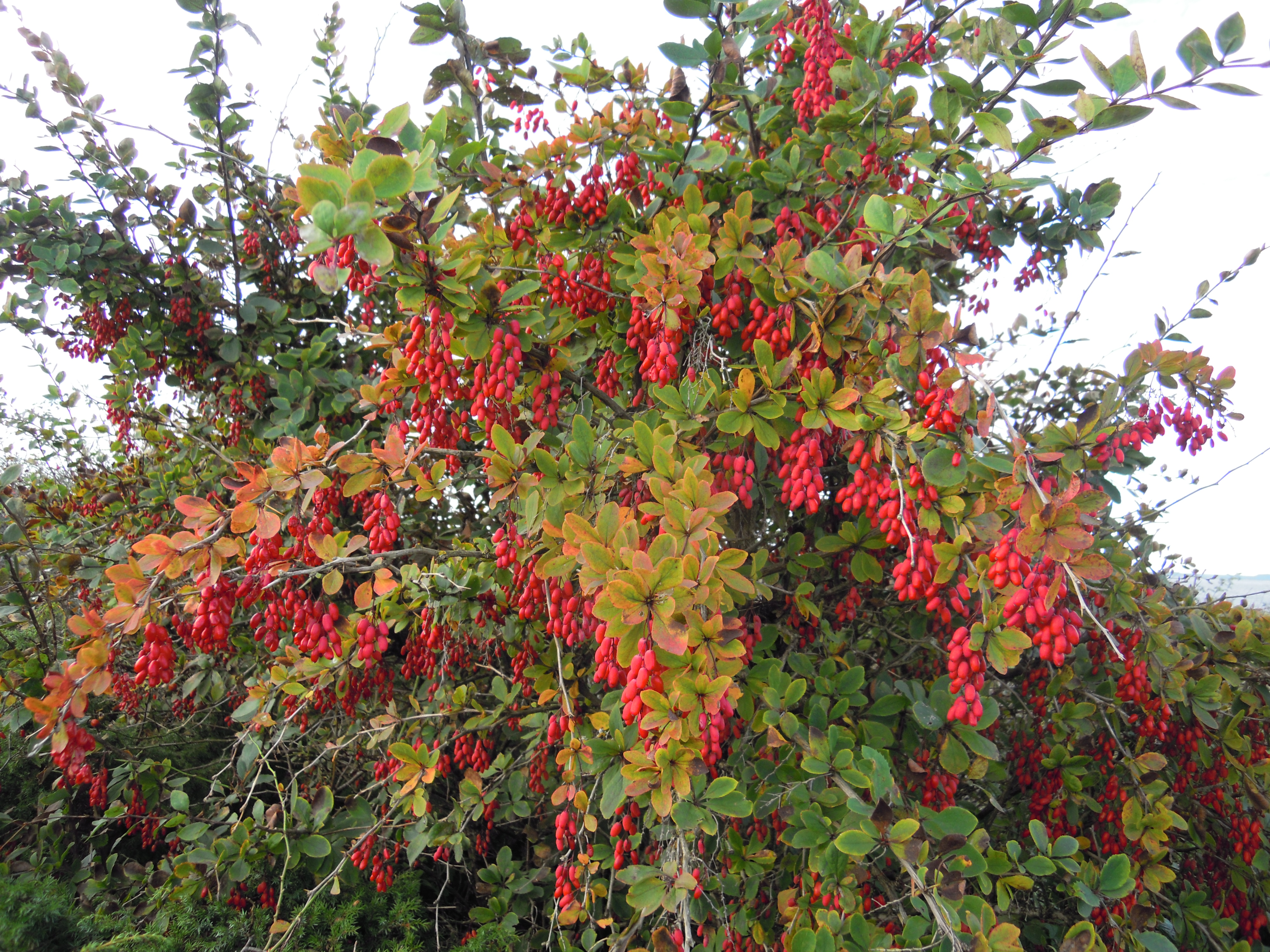
Fruit

== Subspecies ==
As of March 2024, Plants of the World Online accepted three subspecies:

- Berberis vulgaris subsp. australis (Boiss.) Heywood
- Berberis vulgaris subsp. seroi O.Bolòs & Vigo
- Berberis vulgaris subsp. vulgaris

== Distribution and habitat ==
The shrub is native to central and southern Europe, southern England, northwest Africa and western Asia; it is also naturalised in northern Europe and North America. In the United States and Canada, it has become established in the wild over an area from Nova Scotia to Nebraska, with additional populations in Colorado, Idaho, Washington state, Montana, and British Columbia. It is also cultivated in many countries.

== Ecology ==
The berries are an important food for many small birds, which disperse the seeds in their droppings.

B. vulgaris is the alternate host species of the wheat stem rust fungus (Puccinia graminis f. sp. tritici), a grass-infecting rust fungus that is a serious fungal disease of wheat and related grains. For this reason, cultivation of B. vulgaris is prohibited in Canada and some areas of the US (Connecticut, Massachusetts, Michigan, and New Hampshire).

== Phytochemistry ==
The main compounds are isoquinoline and protoberberine alkaloids; the primary constituents include berberine, oxyacanthine, palmatine, berberrubine, lambertine, obamegine, aromoline, columbamine, berlambine, tejedine, berbidine, and berbamine. The fruits were found to contain the terpenoids lupeol and oleanolic acid, as well as the steroids stigmasterol and stigmasterol glucoside.

== Uses ==
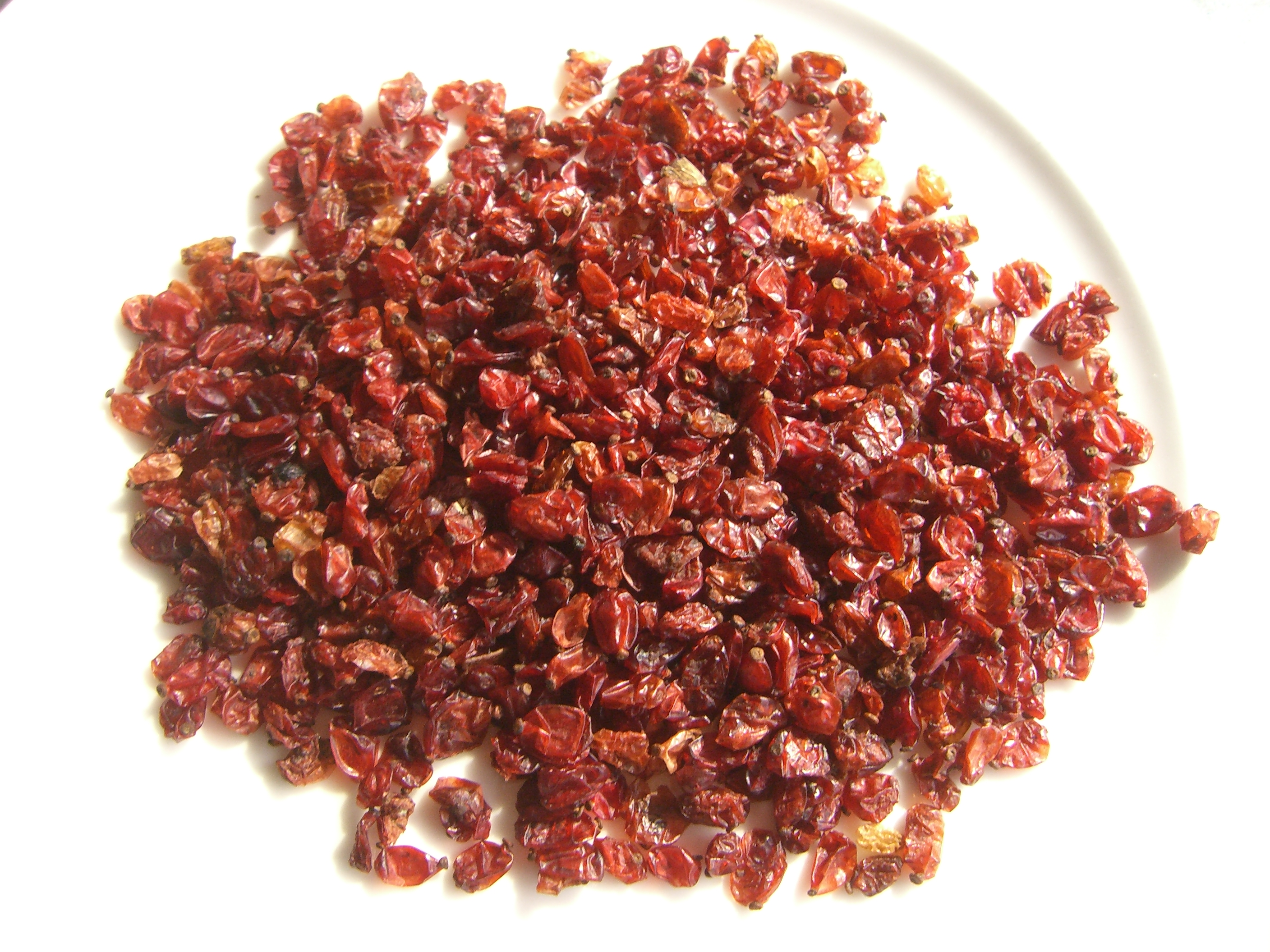
Dried barberries

The edible berries, though rich in vitamin C, have a very sharp or sour flavour and are not widely consumed because the thorny shrubs make them difficult to harvest.

In Europe, the berries have been traditionally used as an ingredient in making jam. The berries are high in pectin which makes the jam congeal as it cools after having been boiled. In southwestern Asia, especially Iran, the berries are used for cooking, as well as for jam-making. In Iran, barberries are commonly used as a currant in rice pilaf.

زرشک zerešk is the Persian name for the dried fruit of Berberis spp., particularly also that of Berberis integerrima called زرشک بی‌دانه zerešk bi-dâne, literally 'seedless barberry', which is widely cultivated in Iran. Iran is the largest producer of zerešk.

The South Khorasan province in Iran is the main area of zerešk and saffron production in the world, especially around Birjand and Qaen. About 85% of production is in Qaen and about 15% in Birjand. There is evidence of cultivation of seedless barberry in South Khorasan two hundred years ago. A garden of zerešk is called زرشکستان zerešk-estân. Zerešk is widely used in cooking, imparting a tart flavour to chicken dishes. It is usually cooked with rice, called زرشک پلو zerešk polo, and provides a meal with chicken.

=== Other uses ===
The plant has been widely cultivated for hedges in New Zealand.

A decoction of the plant has been used as a folk medicine to treat gastrointestinal ailments and coughs, although its use has been limited due to the bitter taste of the bark and root.

== See also ==
- Berberis microphylla, calafate (a related shrub with similar berries, native in temperate South America)

== Bibliography ==
- Ehrlén, Johan; Eriksson, Ove (1991). "Phenological variation in fruit characteristics in vertebrate-dispersed plants". Oecologia. 86 (4): 463–470. doi:10.1007/BF00318311. ISSN 0029-8549.
