= Fangchinoline =

Names
- IUPAC name (1β)-6,6',12-trimethoxy-2,2'-dimethylberbaman-7-ol

Identifiers
CAS Number	436-77-1
3D model (JSmol)	Interactive image
ChEBI	CHEBI:132893
ChemSpider	66173
PubChem CID	73481
UNII	953592C3ZB
CompTox Dashboard (EPA)	DTXSID40893498
- InChI: InChI=1S/C37H40N2O6/c1-38-14-12-24-19-31(42-4)33-21-27(24)28(38)16-22-6-9-26(10-7-22)44-32-18-23(8-11-30(32)41-3)17-29-35-25(13-15-39(29)2)20-34(43-5)36(40)37(35)45-33/h6-11,18-21,28-29,40H,12-17H2,1-5H3/t28-,29-/m0/s1 Key: IIQSJHUEZBTSAT-VMPREFPWSA-N
- SMILES: C12=CC(=C3C=C1[C@@H](N(CC2)C)CC4=CC=C(C=C4)OC5=CC(C[C@]6(C=7C(=C(C(=CC7CCN6C)OC)O)O3)[H])=CC=C5OC)OC

Properties
Chemical formula	C_{37}H_{40}N_{2}O_{6}
Molar mass	608.735 g·mol^{−1}
- Except where otherwise noted, data are given for materials in their standard state (at 25 °C [77 °F], 100 kPa). Infobox references

Fangchinoline is a chemical compound isolated from Stephania tetrandra. It has in vitro antiproliferative activity against a breast cancer cell line.
