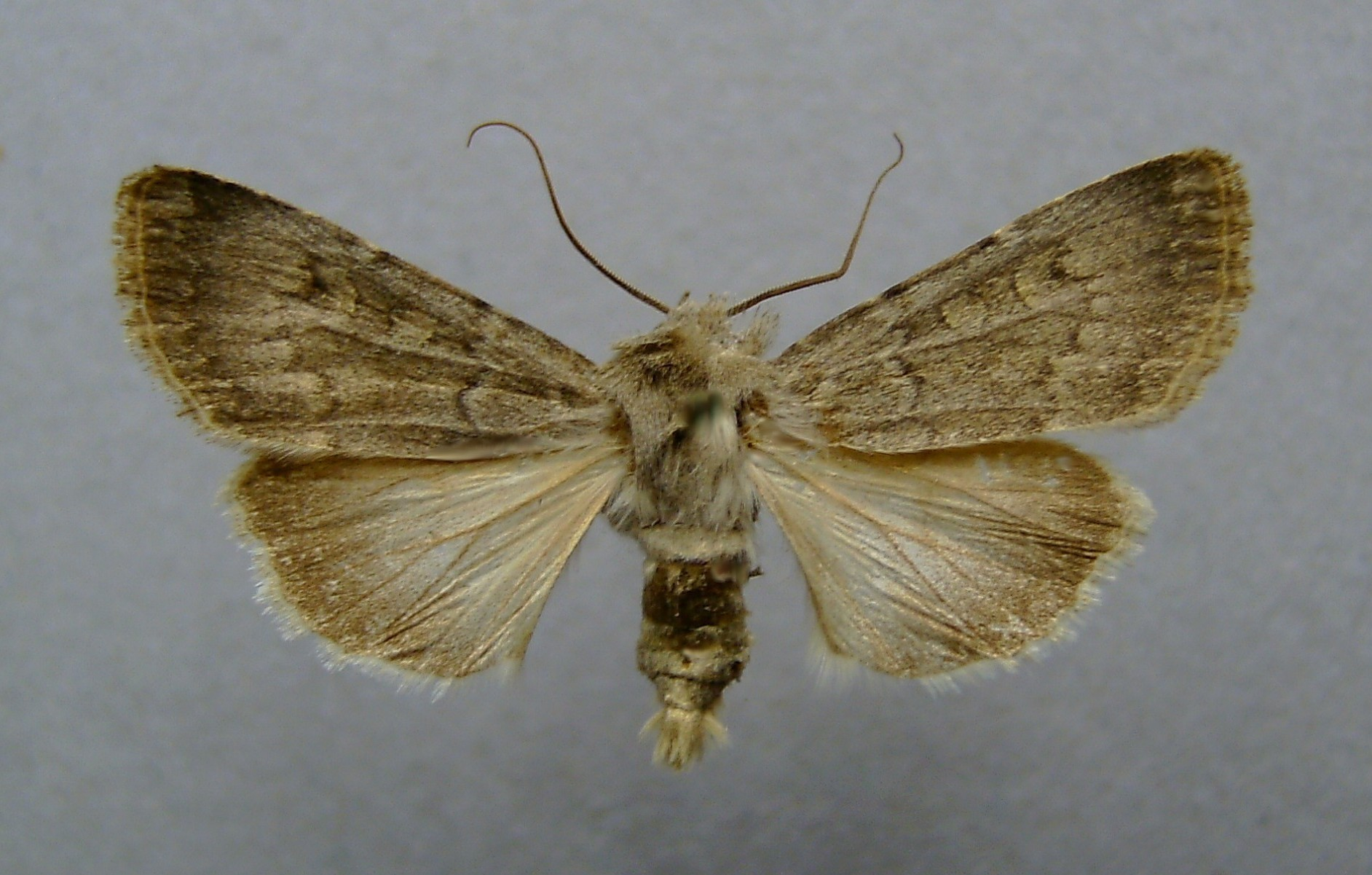

Scientific classification
- Kingdom: Animalia
- Phylum: Arthropoda
- Class: Insecta
- Order: Lepidoptera
- Superfamily: Noctuoidea
- Family: Noctuidae
- Genus: Euxoa
- Species: E. decora

Binomial name
- Euxoa decora (Denis & Schiffermüller, 1775)

Synonyms
- Noctua decora Denis & Schiffermüller 1775; Euxoa nivens Hübner, [1821]; Euxoa nebulosa Hübner, [1808]; Euxoa decora f. nivalis Vorbrodt, 1912; Agrotis decora var. decorata Neuburger, 1904; Euxoa decora f. flavomaculata Schawerda, 1924; Noctua simulatrix Hübner, [1824]; Euxoa livida Staudinger, 1901; Agrotis decora var. livida Staudinger, 1901; Agrotis decora f. simplex Turati & Verity, 1911; Euxoa decora f. flavorenalis Bubacek, 1924; Euxoa decora var. albidecora Sohn-Rethel, 1929

= Euxoa decora =

Species of moth

Euxoa decora is a moth of the family Noctuidae. It is found in southern and central Europe, Morocco, Algeria, the Caucasus, Armenia, Issyk-Kul, Turkey, Iran and Iraq.

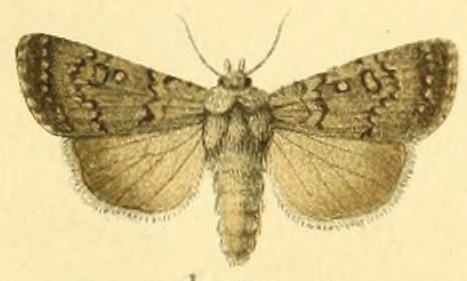
Illustration

== Description ==
It has a typical wingspan of 38–41 mm. Warren states E. decora Schiff. ( nebulosa Hbn., marcens Chr.) (6d). Forewing dull ashgrey, sometimes with a brownish or ochreous tinge; lines dark, often obscure; stigmata pale, sometimes ochreous; claviform, when present, yellowish; hindwing dull fuscous, with the base paler in male. Common on the Mountains of Central Europe and in Armenia; — in ab. livida Stgr. (6d) the ground colour is dark purplish grey and the stigmata well-defined; the orbicular round and sometimes filled up with ochreous.

== Subspecies ==
- Euxoa decora decora (eastern part of the Alps and adjacent regions in the east, northern Italy)
- Euxoa decora simulatrix (western Alps, Pyrenees)
- Euxoa decora splendida (Italy (Abruzzi))
- Euxoa decora macedonica (southern Yugoslasvia, north-western and southern Greece)
- Euxoa decora olympica (central Greece (Olympus and Grammos Mountains))
- Euxoa decora hackeri (northern Greece (Mount Phalakron))

== Biology ==
Each generation of adults are on wing from July to September, and larvae feed on a wide range of low growing plants, including Anthyllis vulneraria.
