= Bisbenzylisoquinoline alkaloids =

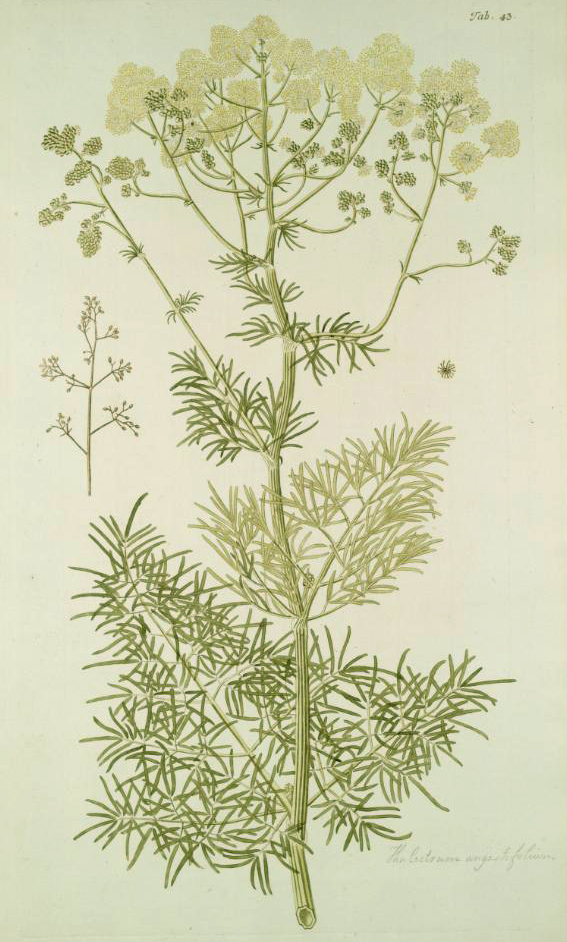
Thalictrum lucidum

Bisbenzylisoquinoline alkaloids are natural products found primarily in the plant families of the barberry family, the Menispermaceae, the Monimiaceae, and the buttercup family.

== Occurrence ==
More than 225 different bisbenzylisoquinoline alkaloids are known and have been isolated.

== Representative ==
The bisbenzylisoquinoline alkaloids are considered the largest group within the isoquinoline alkaloids. The best-known representative of this group is tubocurarine chloride. Other representatives include dauricin, oxyacanthin, tetrandrine, and tiliacorin.

dauricine

Oxyacanthine

Tiliacorine

Tubocurarine

== Structure ==
Bisbenzylisoquinoline alkaloids are characterized by their structure. Typically, they consist of two benzyl-tetrahydroquinoline units linked by ether groups, and occasionally by C-C bonds. Multiple ether bridges are often present. These alkaloids can be categorized into three groups, using the nomenclature head for the 1,2,3,4-tetrahydroisoquinoline unit and tail for the 1-benzyl residue:

- head-head
- tail-tail-
- head-tail-linked bisbenzylisoquinoline alkaloids.

Dauricine is the simplest representative with a tail-to-tail linkage. Oxyacanthine and Tetrandrin contain both head-head and tail-tail linkages, while Tiliacorine features one tail-tail linkage and two head-head linkages linking to a dibenzodioxin moiety. Tubocurarine chloride is characterized by two head-tail linkages of the tetrahydroisoquinoline units. In the following structural formulae, the tail linkages are marked red and the head linkages are marked blue:

Dauricine

Oxyacanthine

Tiliacorine

Tubocurarine

== Uses ==
The alkaloids belonging to the bisbenzylisoquinoline group are generally toxic and exhibit curarizing effects. Oxyacanthine serves as a sympatholytic agent, an antagonist to epinephrine, and a vasodilator. Tubocurarine, a potent curarizing poison, stands as the oldest known muscle relaxant. South American indigenous populations have traditionally employed it as an arrow poison (see curare).

Tetrandine, found as an ingredient in the Chinese medicine "han-fang-shi," possesses analgesic and antipyretic properties.
