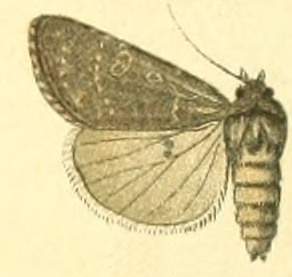
- Female
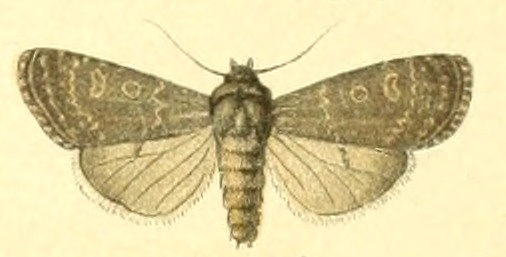
- Male

Scientific classification
- Kingdom: Animalia
- Phylum: Arthropoda
- Class: Insecta
- Order: Lepidoptera
- Superfamily: Noctuoidea
- Family: Noctuidae
- Genus: Euxoa
- Species: E. birivia

Binomial name
- Euxoa birivia (Denis & Schiffermüller, 1775)

Synonyms
- Noctua birivia Denis & Schiffermüller, 1775; Agrotis honoratina Donzel, 1837; Agrotis birivia var. sudeticola Skala, 1929

= Euxoa birivia =

Species of moth

Euxoa birivia is a moth of the family Noctuidae. It is found in Europe (France, Italy, Germany, Switzerland, Austria, Poland, Czech Republic, Slovakia, Hungary, Romania, Albania, Slovenia, Bosnia and Herzegovina, Bulgaria and Croatia), east to Ukraine, the Caucasus, Armenia, central Asia, Ili, Issyk-Kul, Turkey and Iran.

== Description ==
The wingspan is 34–41 mm. Warren states E. birivia Schiff. (= honoratina Donz., dolis Grote) (6c). Forewing dark ashgrey, with pale dusting;lines themselves ill-defined, but marked by paler scaling; orbicular and reniform stigmata ochreous, or with the centres dark but ringed with ochreous; hindwing fuscous grey, paling towards base. Occurs in S. Europe, in the French and Swiss Alps, in Italy,, Austria and Hungary; — in the ab. taurica Stgr. the pale scales are ochreous yellow, instead of white; this form occurs in Asia Minor and Turkestan.

== Biology ==
Adults are on wing from mid July to the end of August. There is one generation per year.

The larvae probably feed on the roots of various grass species.
