= Cyclanoline =

Names
- Other names Cissamine

Identifiers
CAS Number	18556-27-9
3D model (JSmol)	Interactive image
ChEBI	CHEBI:76923
ChemSpider	2339606
PubChem CID	3082134
UNII	77QC59KBD2
CompTox Dashboard (EPA)	DTXSID00171789
- InChI: InChI=1S/C20H23NO4/c1-21-7-6-13-9-19(25-3)17(22)10-14(13)16(21)8-12-4-5-18(24-2)20(23)15(12)11-21/h4-5,9-10,16H,6-8,11H2,1-3H3,(H-,22,23)/p+1/t16-,21-/m0/s1 Key: LKLWVKCEYSPQHL-KKSFZXQISA-O
- SMILES: COc1ccc2C[C@H]3c4cc(O)c(OC)cc4CC[N@@+]3(C)Cc2c1O

Properties
Chemical formula	C_{20}H_{23}NO_{4}^{+}
Molar mass	341.406 g·mol^{−1}
- Except where otherwise noted, data are given for materials in their standard state (at 25 °C [77 °F], 100 kPa). Infobox references

Cyclanoline is an acetylcholinesterase inhibitor isolated from Stephania venosa tuber.
