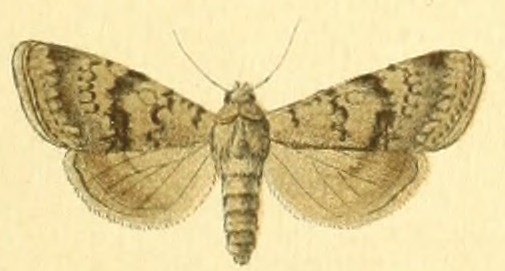
- Female
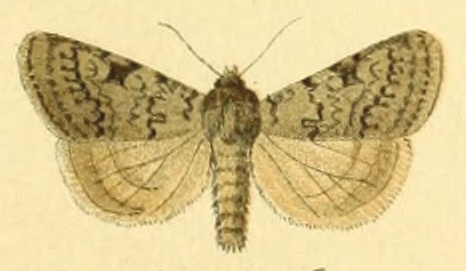
- Male

Scientific classification
- Domain: Eukaryota
- Kingdom: Animalia
- Phylum: Arthropoda
- Class: Insecta
- Order: Lepidoptera
- Superfamily: Noctuoidea
- Family: Noctuidae
- Genus: Epipsilia
- Species: E. grisescens

Binomial name
- Epipsilia grisescens (Fabricius, 1794)

Synonyms
- Noctua grisescens Fabricius, 1794; Rhyacia grisescens (Fabricius, 1794); Euxoa grisescens (Fabricius, 1794); Epipsilia ignicola Hübner, [1813]; Epipsilia latens Boisduval, 1832 (preocc.); Epipsilia corrosa Herrich-Schäffer, 1850; Epipsilia defasciata Wendlandt, 1902; Epipsilia fasciata Vorbrodt, 1917; Epipsilia albescens Sohn-Rethel, 1929; Epipsilia (Agrotis) grisescens coralita Hospital, 1948; Epipsilia obscurata Feichtenberger, 1942; Epipsilia lucida Feichtenberger, 1962

= Epipsilia grisescens =

Species of moth

Epipsilia grisescens is a moth of the family Noctuidae. It is found in Fennoscandia, Denmark as well as the Pyrenees, Alps, Apennines, Balkans and Carpathians. In the Alps it is found up to 2,000 meters.

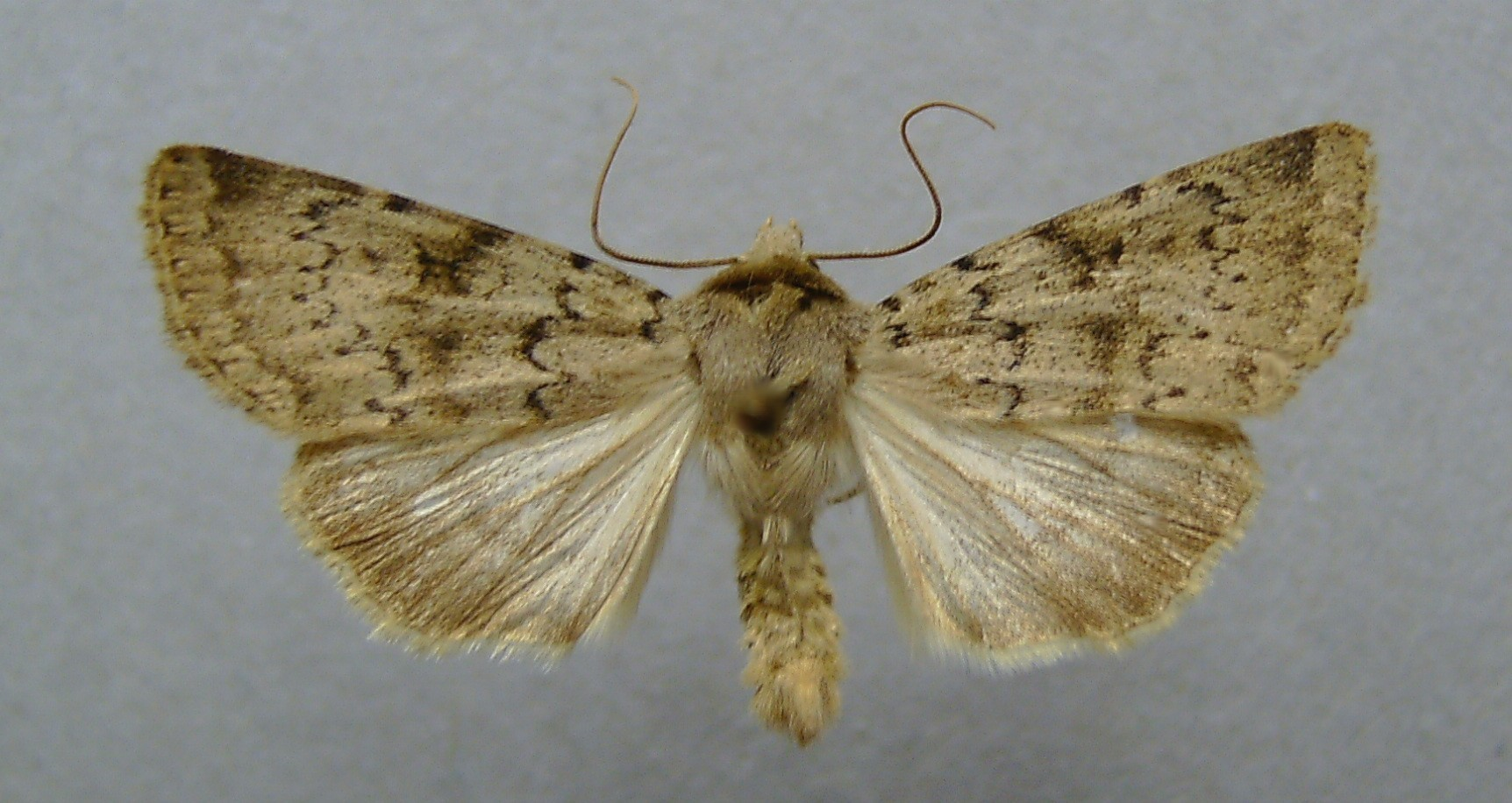

== Description ==
The wingspan is 24–34 mm. E. grisescens F. (= candelisequa Hbn., ? ignicola Hbn., latens Boisd., corrosa H.-Sch.) (6g). Fore- wing shining pale or brownish grey; the lines black and very distinct; orbicular and reniform stigmata illdefined, but separated by a quadrate black spot, sometimes placed on a broad median shade; hindwing dull white, towards termen fuscous brown; a widely spread species in Europe, occurring in the Mts. of France, Switzerland. Italy, Hungary and Scandinavia; the 2 forms thianshanica Stgr. and hyrcana Stgr.[now subspecies E. l. hyrcana (Staudinger, 1899)], the former smaller, with whitish grey, less marked, forewings, the latter yellowish grey, both occur only in W. Asia, the former in Turkestan, the latter in Persia. Larva (teste Ruhl) brownish green, with white lines and dark oblique subdorsal streaks; the head yellow green varied with dark; feeding on Leontodon taraxacum.

== Subspecies ==
- Epipsilia grisescens grisescens (Pyrenees, Alps, Apennines, Balkans, Carpathians)
- Epipsilia grisescens septentrionalis (Fennoscandia, Denmark)

== Biology ==
Adults are on wing from June to August in one generation.

The larvae feed on Festuca species.
