= Berbamine =

Identifiers
CAS Number	478-61-5
3D model (JSmol)	Interactive image
ChEMBL	ChEMBL504323
ChemSpider	9764
ECHA InfoCard	100.006.840
PubChem CID	10170
UNII	V5KM4XJ0WM
CompTox Dashboard (EPA)	DTXSID40963943
- InChI: InChI=1S/C37H40N2O6/c1-38-14-12-24-19-32(41-3)33-21-27(24)28(38)16-22-6-9-26(10-7-22)44-31-18-23(8-11-30(31)40)17-29-35-25(13-15-39(29)2)20-34(42-4)36(43-5)37(35)45-33/h6-11,18-21,28-29,40H,12-17H2,1-5H3 Key: DFOCUWZXJBAUSQ-UHFFFAOYSA-N; InChI=1/C37H40N2O6/c1-38-14-12-24-19-32(41-3)33-21-27(24)28(38)16-22-6-9-26(10-7-22)44-31-18-23(8-11-30(31)40)17-29-35-25(13-15-39(29)2)20-34(42-4)36(43-5)37(35)45-33/h6-11,18-21,28-29,40H,12-17H2,1-5H3 Key: DFOCUWZXJBAUSQ-UHFFFAOYAJ
- SMILES: O(c7c(OC)cc4c5c7Oc1cc2c(cc1OC)CCN(C)C2Cc6ccc(Oc3cc(ccc3O)CC5N(C)CC4)cc6)C

Properties
Chemical formula	C_{37}H_{40}N_{2}O_{6}
Molar mass	608.7233
- Except where otherwise noted, data are given for materials in their standard state (at 25 °C [77 °F], 100 kPa). verify (what is ?) Infobox references

Berbamine is a calcium channel blocker.
