= Amri =

Amri or AMRI may refer to:

== Organisations ==
- AMRI Global (Albany Molecular Research Inc.), a contract research and manufacturing organization
- AMRI Hospitals, a private hospital chain in India
  - 2011 AMRI Hospital fire
- Australian Museum Research Institute, a research institute at the Australian Museum, Canberra

== Peoples and culture ==
- Amri culture, associated with archaeological sites in Sindh and Balochistan, Pakistan
- Amri language, spoken by the Karbi people of Assam and Meghalaya, India
- Amri people, an ethnic group of Sudan

== Individual people ==
=== Surname ===
- Amri (surname), people with the surname

=== Given name ===
- Amri Che Mat, Malaysian abducted social activist
- Amri Hernández-Pellerano, Puerto Rican electronics engineer and scientist
- Amri Kiemba (born 1983), Tanzanian footballer
- Amris (1957–2021), Indonesian politician and general
- Amri Shirazi, Persian poet
- Amri Syahnawi (born 1998), Indonesian badminton player
- Amri Wandel (born 1954), Zionist astrophysicist
- Azrul Amri Burhan (born 1975), Malaysian footballer
- Faizul Amri Adnan (born 1973), Malaysian politician
- Kaluta Amri Abeid (1924–1964), Tanzanian Muslim cleric
- Mohd Amri Yahyah (born 1981), Malaysian footballer
- Muhamad Amri Wahab, Malaysian politician

== Places ==
- Amri, Iran, various places in Iran
- Amri, Sindh, an ancient settlement in modern-day Sindh, Pakistan
- Amri railway station, Pakistan

== Other uses ==
- Amplified magnetic resonance imaging, a type of magnetic resonance imaging in medicine
- Amri (film), an American biographical drama film depicting the life of Amrita Sher-Gil

== See also ==
- Borj El Amri, a town in the Manouba Governorate, Tunisia
- Dar Bel Amri, a Moroccan rural commune in Sidi Slimane Province, Rabat-Salé-Kénitra
- Amari (disambiguation)
- Ameri (disambiguation)
- AMR (disambiguation)
- Omri (disambiguation)
