= AMR =

Amr or AMR may refer to:

== Science, environment and medicine ==
- Antimicrobial resistance, of microorganisms (bacteria, viruses, parasites) to antimicrobials
- Anisotropic magnetoresistance, resistance varying with magnetic field
- Accelerating Moment Release, an earthquake precursor
- Advanced Modular Reactor, a proposed Small modular reactor design
- Autonomous mobile robot

== Information technology ==
- Abstract Meaning Representation, a semantic annotation framework for natural language text
- Audio/modem riser, on a computer motherboard
- Adaptive Multi-Rate audio codec for speech coding
- Adaptive mesh refinement in numerical analysis
- AMR radiotelephone network (Czechoslovakia) (in Czech, Automatizovaný městský radiotelefon)
- Automatic meter reading, for utility meters
- AMR (R package), for analysing antimicrobial resistance data

== Companies ==
- Abbingdon Music Research, a UK audio manufacturer
- American Medical Response, a private ambulance operator
- AMR Corporation, former parent company of American Airlines
- Arcata and Mad River Railroad

== Financial ==
- Applicable Margin Reset, a procedure for changing the interest rate on CLOs

== People ==
- Amr (given name), an Arabic male given name
- Amr (surname), an Arabic surname
- Alexis Mercedes Rinck, a Seattle councilmember

== Military ==
- AMR 35, a French light tank
- Andrew Mlangeni Regiment, an infantry regiment of the South African Army
- Anti-materiel rifle, high caliber rifle

== Other uses ==
- Advanced meat recovery or mechanically recovered meat
- Amarakaeri language of Peru (ISO 639-3 code "amr")
- Amersham station, UK National Rail Code
- Àmr, the seventh solo album by progressive black metal musician Ihsahn
- Aston Martin Racing, UK motor racing team
- Revolutionary Marxist Alliance (Alliance marxiste révolutionnaire), a 1969–1974 French political party

== See also ==
- Amri (disambiguation)
- Amer (disambiguation)
- Amir (disambiguation)
- AMRS (disambiguation)
