= The Finger Awards =

Awards for comedic projects

- Awarded for: Outstanding comedic projects with social impact
- Presented by: Comedy for Change
- First award: December 5, 2019; 6 years ago
- Website: thefingerawards.org

The Finger Awards is a prize created to honor outstanding comedic projects with social impact anywhere around the world. It is given by the Comedy for Change international community and was created by the content executive Omri Marcus and produced by Noa Margalit.

The first-ever Finger Awards ceremony was in December 2019 hosted by Cally Beaton, a former senior TV executive, turned comedian at an event held at C21 Content London. Due to COVID-19, the 2020 Awards were given in December 2020, again hosted by Beaton at a virtual event held at C21 Content London.

The Finger Award was created to provide a platform for comedy professionals who have gone out of their way to try to make the world a better place using their craft. It represents an industry recognition of these efforts by an international panel of over 50 A-list judges, all members of the Comedy for Change community. Among them are writers from The Simpsons, Family Guy, HIGNFY and more.

Nominations for the Finger Awards included 80 candidates from over 30 countries and encompassed standup routines, trolling acts, TV shows, ad campaigns, podcasts and more.

== Winners 2020 ==
The Finger Award for Most Creative Comedy went to the Dick Pics Museum in Germany, where award-winning German TV show Joko & Klaas Gegen Prosieben ran a campaign against sexual harassment. In a museum space, the creators opened an exhibition of ‘Dick Pics’ that a famous actress had received. The exhibition featured in a 15-minute special segment about gender relations that also included female celebrities sharing sexist comments made after they appeared on social media.

The Finger Award for Most Effective Comedy was won by Star Trek actor and social media sensation George Takei for reclaiming the term ‘Proud Boys’ from the far-right, neo-fascist and male-only political organization of that name that promotes and engages in political violence. Takei encouraged Twitter users to flood the platform with images of LGBTQi pride using the #proudboys hashtag.

2020's Special COVID-19 category went to The Corona Song from Vietnam. The Vietnam Institute of Occupational and Environmental Health set the #GhenCoVyChallenge, which turned into a mass dance craze that encouraged people to wash their hands properly and stay healthy during the coronavirus pandemic. Thousands of funny variations for it were created on TikTok.

Special Contribution to Comedy was awarded to British comic Ricky Gervais recognition of his "brave use of comedy to promote representation of disability and discourse about depression and mourning" in Netflix series After Life.

== Winners 2019 ==
The Finger Award for Most Creative Comedy was given to Taboo a 9x 60 Belgian TV show which first aired on broadcaster VRT in 2018 with a 54% share and has been given a greenlight for another series in 2021. In Taboo, comedian Philippe Geubels invites four guests with a range of disabilities or illnesses for a week's holiday in a lovely country house. After spending time getting to know his guests, he does an entire comedy-set on every topic with his new made friends on the front seats of a venue packed with people who are confronted with the same issue.

The Finger Award for Most Effective Comedy was given to The Tampon Book created by Germany-based The Female Company. They created a campaign against unfair taxation of female sanitary products. The Female Company "tricked" the system by selling tampons hidden in a book thus avoiding the controversial "luxury items" tax on female hygiene products.

An honorary mention was awarded to German comic Jan Böhmermann for his project Do They Know It's Europe where 20 political satirists from 16 European countries, united to create a new European anthem for the 2019 European Parliament election.

== Comedy for Change ==
Established in 2014, Comedy for Change is a vibrant international community of comedy writers, performers and executives who are interested in using their skills and platforms to effect social change. The network has over 100 senior representatives from 20 countries. The goal of the network is to share, teach, learn, and collaborate in creating effective comic content. Special focus is given to fighting racism and discrimination.
