= Amri, Iran =

Amri, Iran may refer to:

- Amreh, Sari
- Ameri, Deylam

== See also ==
- Amri (disambiguation)
- Ameri (disambiguation)
