= AMRS =

AMRS may refer to:

== Groups, organizations ==
- Arizona Model Railroading Society (AMRS)
- African Materials Research Society; see Hulda Swai
- American Moral Reform Society
- AMPATH Medical Record System (AMRS), Academic Model Providing Access to Healthcare (AMPATH), Eldoret, Kenya; a member of OpenMRS
- Associação de Municípios da Região de Setúbal (AMRS; amrs.pt; Portuguese: Association of Municipalities of the Setúbal Region), Península de Setúbal, Lisboa Region, Portugal
- Australian Motor Racing Series

== Other uses ==
- Master of Arts in Religious Studies (A.M.R.S.), offered at University of Chicago Divinity School
- Aeronautical mobile radiocommunication service (AMRS)
  - Aeronautical mobile (R) service ["AM(R)S"], part of the aeronautical mobile service for on air route civil flights
- Air mail radio station, a form of air traffic control of the inter-war period in the US

== See also ==
- Arms (disambiguation)
- AMR (disambiguation) for the singular of AMRs
