= Amr (given name) =

- Pronunciation: Arabic: [ˈʕamr] Egyptian Arabic: [ˈʕɑm.ɾe]
- Gender: Male
- Language: Arabic

Origin
- Origin: Arabic
- Meaning: Long-lived, Life
- Region of origin: Muslims

Other names
- Alternative spelling: Amro, Amru, Amre, Amer
- Nicknames: Amoori, Miro, Ammoor, Mrmar, Amroo
- Popularity: see popular names

Amr (Arabic: عمرو) is an Arabic male given name.

== Etymology ==
It is most commonly written as "Amr", but is also written as "Amro". The word is derived from the tri-literal Arabic root (ع م ر) meaning "to live a long time."

When the Arabic letter wāw is added to the end of the Arabic name Umar, the name changes to "Amr". Although very close in writing in Arabic, they are two different names, though sometimes the one is transliterated as the other, so ʿAmr ibn al-ʿAs is sometimes transliterated as "Omar ibn al-Aas". In the same way, it is possible to find Omar ibn al-Khattab transliterated as "Amr ibn al-Khattab". The transcription of "Amr" as "Amro" or "Amru" is another way to differentiate it from the name "Omar".

The most prominent person in Islam named ʿAmr was ʿAmr ibn al-ʿAs.

== People ==
- Amr ibn Abd al-Wud (died 627), champion of Quraish
- Amr ibn al-Layth (died 902), ruler of the Saffarid dynasty of Iran
- Amr ibn Hisham (died 624), Meccan leader (Muhammad called him Abu Jahl)
- Amr ibn Jarmouz, (fl. 656), killer of Talha
- Amr ibn Khalid (died 680), one of the Companions of Husayn ibn Ali
- Amr ibn Kulthum (died 584), leader of the Taghlab tribe
- Amr ibn Maymun, one of the Ansar companions of Muhammad
- Amr ibn Ubayd (died 761), Mu'tazili leader
- Amr Adel (born 1980), Egyptian footballer
- Amr Darrag (born 1958), Egyptian engineer and politician
- Amr Diab (born 1961), Egyptian musician
- Amr El Halwani (born 1985), Egyptian footballer
- Amr El-Safty (born 1982), Egyptian footballer
- Amr Fahim (born 1976), Egyptian footballer
- Amr Ghoneim, Egyptian tennis player
- Amr Hamed (died 1998), Canadian killed by US bombing in Afghanistan
- Amr Hamzawy (born 1968), Egyptian political scientist
- Amr Khaled (born 1967), Egyptian activist and preacher
- Amr Mostafa (born 1979), Egyptian singer
- Amr Moussa (born 1936), secretary-general of the League of Arab States
- Amr Salem (born 1958), Syrian politician
- Amr Samaka (born 1983), Egyptian footballer
- Amr Shabana (born 1979), Egyptian squash player
- Amr Sobhy (born 1988), Egyptian information activist, author and poet
- Amr El Solia (born 1990), Egyptian footballer
- Amr Swelim (born 1984), Cairo-born professional squash player
- Amr Waked (born 1973), Egyptian actor
- Amr Warda (born 1993), Egyptian footballer
- Amr Zaki (born 1983), Egyptian footballer

Variants

- Amr ibn al-As (c. 553–664), military commander, led Muslim conquest of Egypt in 640
- Amr ibn Uthman, one of the Tabi'un and son of Uthman
- Amro Jenyat (born 1993), Syrian footballer
- Amer el-Maati (born 1963), Canadian accused of terrorism

== Other uses ==
- Amr (surname)
- Amr (or Amhar), a son of legendary King Arthur
- Banu Amr, a tribe
- Prince Amr Ibrahim Palace, a palace in Egypt
