= Omri (disambiguation) =

Omri was a biblical King of Israel.

Omri, OMRI, Omry, or similar can mean:

== People ==
- Omri Afek (born 1979), Israeli footballer
- Omri Altman (born 1994), Israeli footballer
- Omri Ben Harush (born 1990), Israeli professional footballer
- Omri Boehm (born 1979), Israeli-German philosopher
- Omri Casspi (born 1988), Israeli professional NBA basketball player
- Omri Katz (born 1976), American actor
- Omri Kende (born 1986), Israeli footballer
- Omri Lowther (born 1983), Canadian-American boxer
- Omri Marcus (born 1979), comedy writer and creative director
- Omri Nave (born 1988), Israeli footballer
- Omry Ronen (1937-2012), American Slavist
- Omri Sharon (born 1964), Israeli politician

== Other ==
- House of Omri refers to Omri and his descendants (particularly Ahab)
- Omri, Iran, village in Iran
- Omri, the central character of the British novel The Indian in the Cupboard and its sequels
