= Amr Samaka =

Egyptian footballer (born 1983)

Personal information
- Full name: Amr Ahmed Fathi
- Date of birth: 22 May 1983 (age 43)
- Place of birth: Egypt
- Height: 1.86 m (6 ft 1 in)
- Position: Attacking midfielder

Team information
- Current team: El Gaish

Youth career
- Al Ahly

Senior career*
| Years | Team | Apps | (Gls) |
| 2004–2005 | Tersana | ? | (?) |
| 2005–2007 | Al Ahly | ? | (?) |
| 2007–2009 | Kazma | ? | (?) |
| 2009 | Tersana | 8 | (3) |
| 2009–2010 | El Gouna | 7 | (0) |
| 2010–2011 | Petrojet | 6 | (0) |
| 2011– | El Gaish | | (-) |
- Al-Safa

International career^{‡}
| | Egypt | ? | (?) |
- * Club domestic league appearances and goals as of 25 December 2011 ‡ National team caps and goals as of 24 December 2006

Amr Ahmed Fathi (Arabic: عمرو أحمد فتحي) commonly known as Amr "Samaka" (born 22 May 1983) is an Egyptian footballer currently playing for Lebanese Premier League club Al-Safa' SC.

== Career ==
He joined Al Ahly on 14 June 2005 coming from Tersana and participated in 6 Competitions, National League championships and the shield and Egyptian Super Cup and Egypt once African Champions twice and the African Super Cup. Then, he transferred to Kazma.

Amr Samak made a move to his former team Tersana in January 2009. He spent only 6 months there and scored 3 league goals. Then, he made a huge transfer and joined Egyptian side El Gouna. He then joined Petrojet in a big deal.
