= Curia (company) =

Chemical company

- Industry: Pharmaceuticals
- Founded: 1991
- Founder: Thomas D'Ambra
- Headquarters: Albany, New York, U.S.
- Key people: Philip Macnabb (CEO); Gerald Auer (CFO)
- Revenue: ▲$276.6 million (2014)
- Net income: ▼ -$3.3 million (2014)
- Total assets: ▲$520 million (2014)
- Total equity: ▲$241.8 million (2014)
- Website: curiaglobal.com

Curia (formerly AMRI or Albany Molecular Research Inc.) is a contract research and manufacturing organization that provides drug discovery, development, cGMP manufacturing and aseptic fill and finish to the pharmaceutical and biotechnology industries. Founded in 1991, Curia operates in the United States, Europe and Asia, with its headquarters located in Albany, New York. Curia has announced deals and collaborations with such companies as Pfizer Inc., Merck & Co., Eli Lilly and Company, Takeda, Genentech, Bristol-Myers Squibb Co. and GE.

== History and acquisitions ==
Founded in 1991 as Albany Molecular Research, Inc. (AMRI), the company was established by Thomas E. D’Ambra and Chester Opalka. It was publicly traded on the Nasdaq from 1999 to 2017.

AMRI began operating from laboratory space provided by Siena College, offering custom synthesis services. It later moved to facilities operated by the Wright Malta Corporation, on the site where GlobalFoundries subsequently constructed a semiconductor fabrication plant. In early 1992, the company consolidated its operations at the Rensselaer Polytechnic Institute Incubator Annex in Watervliet, New York. By 1997, the company occupied laboratory space in the C-wing of the University at Albany’s East Campus, formerly the Sterling Winthrop Research Institute.

In 1999, through the purchase of Enzymed Inc. (Iowa City, IA), the company added biocatalysis capabilities before, AMRI acquired American Advanced Organics, Inc. of Syracuse N.Y. in 2000. In 2001, the company added natural product isolation and identification technology through the acquisition of New Chemical Entities of Bothell, WA. In early 2001, AMRI began leasing space in 30 Corporate Circle, which was fitted out as discovery chemistry laboratory space. The company then purchased two buildings at 24 and 26 Corporate Circle. The original building at 26 was demolished. Construction on a new 26 Corporate Circle building began in November 2002 and AMRI’s new Corporate Headquarters was opened in April 2004.

AMRI went on to establish offshore subsidiaries, which included the Albany Molecular Research Singapore Research Centre, Pte. Ltd., located in Singapore, and the Albany Molecular Research Hyderabad Research Centre, Pvt. Ltd., located in India (both in 2005). AMRI acquired the Budapest operations of ComGenex in March 2006. In May 2007, the company officially changed its name to AMRI and introduced a new company logo. AMRI acquired a number of API and chemical intermediates manufacturing facilities from Ariane Orgachem in Aurangabad, India in 2008 then in 2010 AMRI completed the acquisition of Excelsyn in Holywell, U.K. This facility underwent successful inspections by the U.S. Food and Drug Association (FDA) in June 2011, and the UK Medicines and Healthcare products Regulatory Agency (MHRA) in January 2012 allowing for the production of registered intermediates and APIs for human use. After this AMRI expanded into the aseptic fill and finish business, acquiring the parenteral dosage form manufacturing business Hyaluron, located in Burlington, Massachusetts (USA). In early 2012, the company ended operations in Budapest, Hungary, moving most of the operations to the new parallel synthesis and purification laboratories Hyderabad facility. In November 2012, AMRI announced that it would close the Bothell, Washington, site and would transition the sites biology capabilities to Singapore. In December 2012, New York State announced plans to invest $50 million in biomedical research equipment and facilities and secured an agreement with AMRI to locate a new drug discovery R&D facility at the Buffalo Niagara Medical Campus. In December 2012, AMRI Rensselaer was awarded a $200,000 Empire State Development Corporation grant for the expansion of the diagnostic imaging agent project.

AMRI completed an initial public offering in February 1999, raising $56.3 million and listing as AMRI on the Nasdaq. The company also completed a secondary public offering in October 2000, generating further net proceeds of $119.5 million. AMRI’s Allegra patent applications, from 1995, and the resulting patents were licensed to what is now Sanofi-Aventis. The company continues to receive royalties on the sale of Allegra and Telfast products globally.

In June 2014, AMRI acquired OsoBio Pharmaceuticals, a contract manufacturer specializing in aseptic filling, for $110 million.

In February 2015, AMRI acquired SSCI based in West Lafayette, Indiana. SSCI was founded in 1991, providing comprehensive cGMP solid state chemistry research and analytical services to the pharmaceutical industry. Servicing more than 250 customers a year.

In July 2015, the company acquired Gadea Pharmaceutical group for $174 million.

In June 2017 management of AMRI and two private equity firms, The Carlyle Group and GTCR, agreed to sell AMRI to the firms for $21.75 per share, around $1.5 billion, taking the company private. AMRI was weighed down with debt from recent acquisitions and was struggling to make a profit; the arrangement awaited approval of shareholders and regulators. This agreement was part of a burst of M&A activity in the CRO industry, with Lonza Group acquiring Capsugel for around $5.5 billion and Thermo Fisher Scientific buying Patheon for $7.2 billion.

In July 2021, AMRI changed its name to Curia.

In September 2021, the company acquired Integrity Bio and LakePharma, a biologics research, development, and manufacturing organization, for undisclosed amounts. LakePharma's co-founder and CEO, Hua Tu, joined Curia's executive team as the Chief Technology Officer.

== Scientific collaborations ==
In July 1997, AMRI received a $100,000 grant from the National Cancer Institute to “design and synthesize compounds that inhibit a class of enzymes responsible for regulation of the cell cycle”. AMRI then extended a deal in 2001 with Pfizer for three additional years to “provide chemistry, research, development and analytical services”. AMRI entered into a 3-year deal with Merck and Co. to “perform medicinal chemistry research and help design and synthesize compounds” in June 2002 before, in May 2004, AMRI was awarded a three-year contract to manufacture potential treatments for substance abuse by the National Institute of Drug Abuse. In April 2007, AMRI took a lead role in a three-year, multidisciplinary research program, the CancerGrid Project, funded by the European Commission. and went on to receive a multi-year National Institutes of Health (NIH) contract Award for the “development of pre-clinical drug candidates to treat diseases of the nervous system” in August 2011.

In October 2012, AMRI announced a five-year extension of an API supply agreement with Shire for an undisclosed product. In December 2012, AMRI announced a multi-year extension of a commercial supply relationship with GE Healthcare to provide Aminobisamide (ABA), a key intermediate used in several diagnostic imaging agents.

== Awards and nominations ==
- AMRI's then-CEO, Tom D’Ambra, was named as a national finalist for the 2003 Ernst & Young Entrepreneur of the Year Award in the Life Sciences category.
- In May 2007, AMRI received the Excellence in Business Award at the New York State Investors Conference.
- Dr. D’Ambra was inducted into the Tech Valley Business Hall of Fame in May 2008.
- In August 2010, AMRI received the Pfizer Route Design Innovation Award.
- In 2021, AMRI received CMO Leadership Awards across the performance categories Compatibility, Expertise, Quality, Reliability and Service based on small pharma respondents in primary market research conducted by Industry Standard Research (ISR).
