= Amr (surname) =

Amr (Arabic: عمرو) is an Arabic surname. Notable people with the surname include:

- F. D. Amr Bey (1910- ?), Egyptian diplomat and squash player
- Mohamed Kamel Amr (born 1942), Egyptian diplomat
- Nabil Amr (born 1947), Palestinian politician

== See also ==
- Amr (given name)
