= Amris =

Indonesian politician and general (1957–2021)

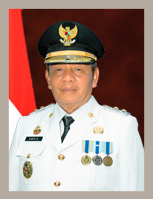
- Amris in 2021

5th Deputy Mayor of Dumai
- In office 26 February 2021 – 29 April 2021
- Preceded by: Eko Suharjo

Member of the Dumai City Regional People's Representative Council
- In office 2009–2014

Personal details
- Born: 29 December 1957 Bukittinggi, Indonesia
- Died: 29 April 2021 (aged 63) Pekanbaru, Indonesia
- Party: PPP

Amris (29 December 1957 – 29 April 2021) was an Indonesian politician and general who served as vice mayor of Dumai.

== Biography ==
Amris enlisted in the Indonesian National Armed Forces in 1979 in the 132nd Infantry Battalion and became Military District Commander of Komando Distrik Militer 0303 in the Bengkalis Regency. He retired from the military in 2006. A member of the United Development Party, he served on the Dumai City Regional People's Representative Council from 2009 to 2014. He was then Deputy Mayor of Dumai from 26 February to 29 April 2021.

Amris died of COVID-19 in Pekanbaru on 29 April 2021 at the age of 63.
