= Adobe Mountain Desert Park =

Park in Phoenix, Arizona, U.S.

Adobe Mountain Desert Park (Railroad Park)
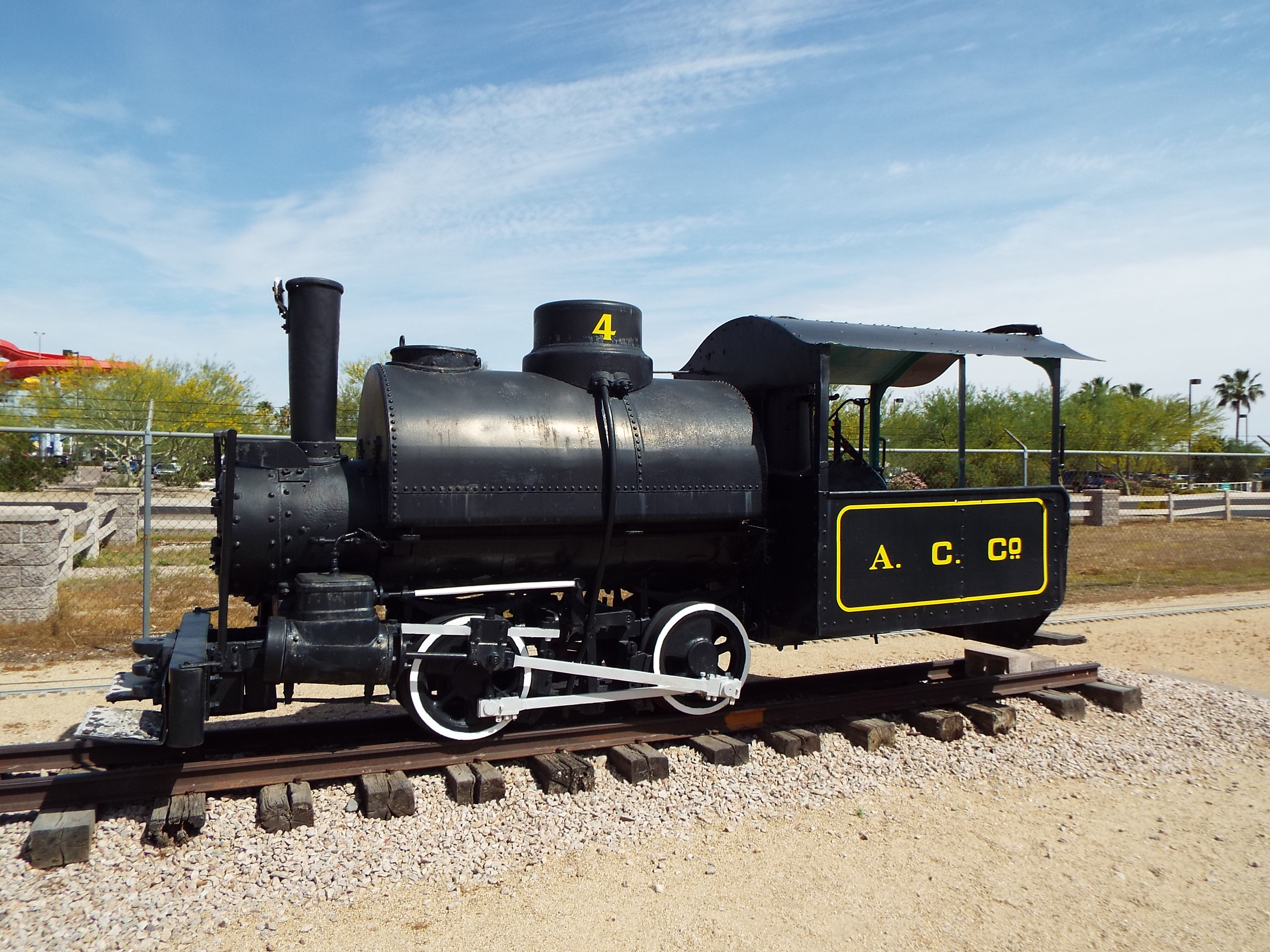
- Porter 0-4-0 18" gauge locomotive
- Interactive map of Adobe Mountain Desert Park (Railroad Park)
- Type: Railroad Park with Museum
- Location: 23280 North 43rd Avenue; Glendale, Arizona
- Coordinates: 33.6959°N 112.1564°W
- Operator: Sahuaro Central
- Website: www.adobemtndesertrrpark.com

The Adobe Mountain Desert Park a.k.a. "The Railroad Park" is a park complex that houses the Sahuaro Central Railroad Heritage preservation Society, Sahuaro Central Railroad Museum, Arizona Model Railroading Society, and the Maricopa Live Steamers. The approximately 160-acre Adobe Mountain Desert Railroad Park is located south of Pinnacle Peak Road on 43rd Avenue in the City of Glendale, Arizona.

In addition, it has several World War II-era Internment Camp Houses, originally intended as temporary housing at the Leupp Isolation Center. This was an Indian boarding school on the Navajo Nation, which was converted to house Japanese-American internees considered to be troublemakers at other internment camps, after these and other Japanese-American citizens had been forcibly removed from the West Coast.

== History ==
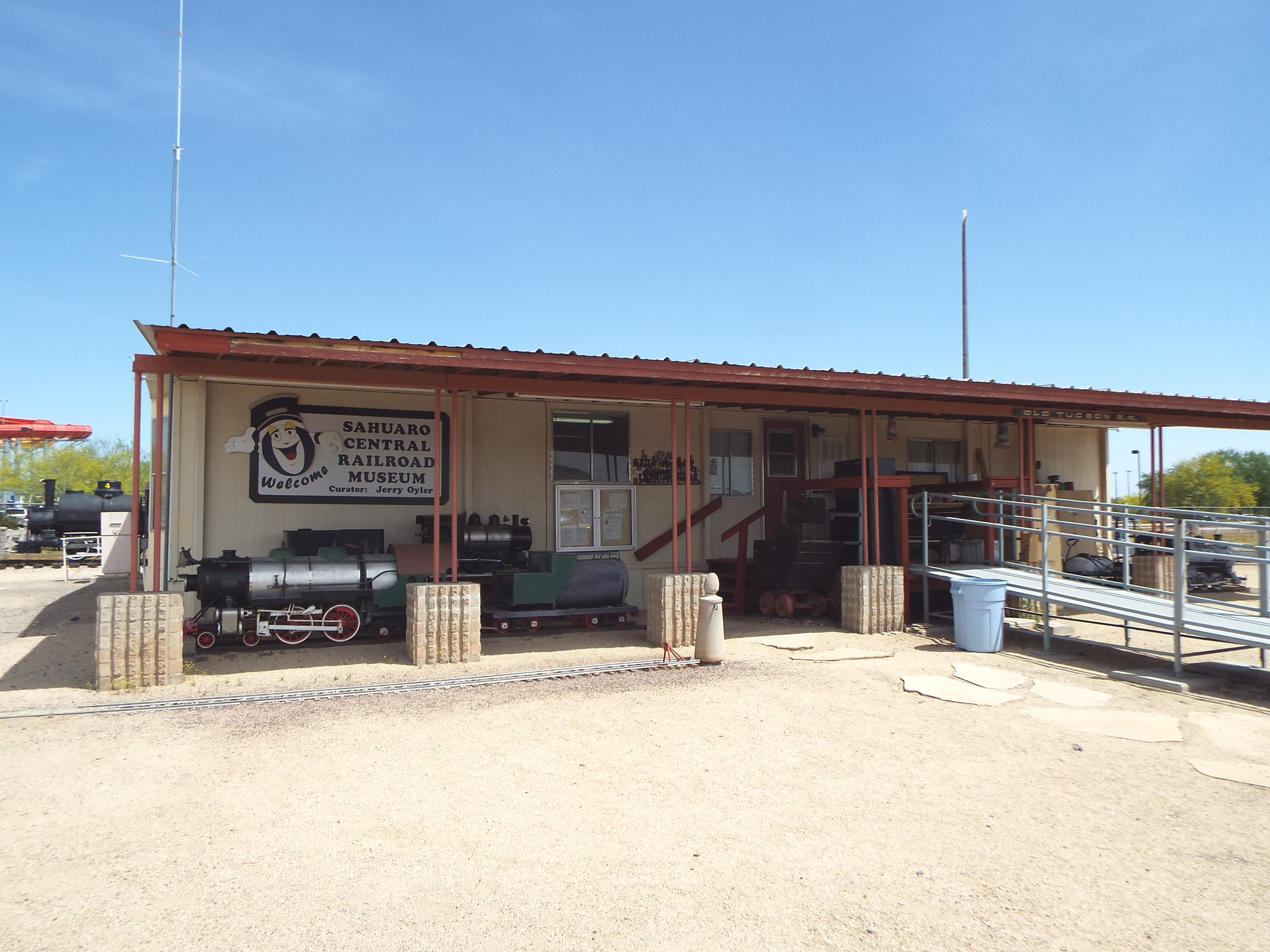
Old Adobe Park Ranger Station which now houses the Sahuaro Central headquarters and Sahuaro Central Railroad Museum

In 1989, the Sahuaro Central Railroad Heritage Preservation Society leased an 80-acre parcel of land from the Maricopa Parks and Recreation Department. It created the Adobe Mountain Desert Railroad Park and Museum. The agreement with the parks department required a no-fee lease for a period of twenty-five years, with an option of an additional twenty-five years.

In 1992, the Arizona Model Railroading Society/Arizona Garden Railway Society (AMRS), which were originally established in 1984, had been told to vacate their Scottsdale property. The AMRS believed that the Adobe Mountain Park seemed like the a good area for them to relocate. They presented a request to the Sahuaro Central in that nature. Later that year an agreement was reached between the AMRS and Sahuaro Central.

The Maricopa Live Steamers (MLS), had their operations in the McCormick-Stillman Railroad Park in Scottsdale. They also wanted to enter into an agreement with Sahuaro Central and transfer their operations to the 80 acre parcel of Land which Sahuaro Central had leased. An agreement was reached in 1992.

The board of directors consists of two members from Sahuaro Central and two members from the AMRS and the MLS. The development of the land leased to the Sahuaro Central is controlled by the Sahuaro Central board of directors. This includes improvements of the common areas of the Park, road easements, parking areas, utility easements, etc. Permanent improvements must be approved by the Sahuaro Central Board of Directors, Maricopa County Recreation Services, Maricopa County Flood Control and the permitting agencies of the City of Phoenix.

=== The Sahuaro Central Railroad Museum ===
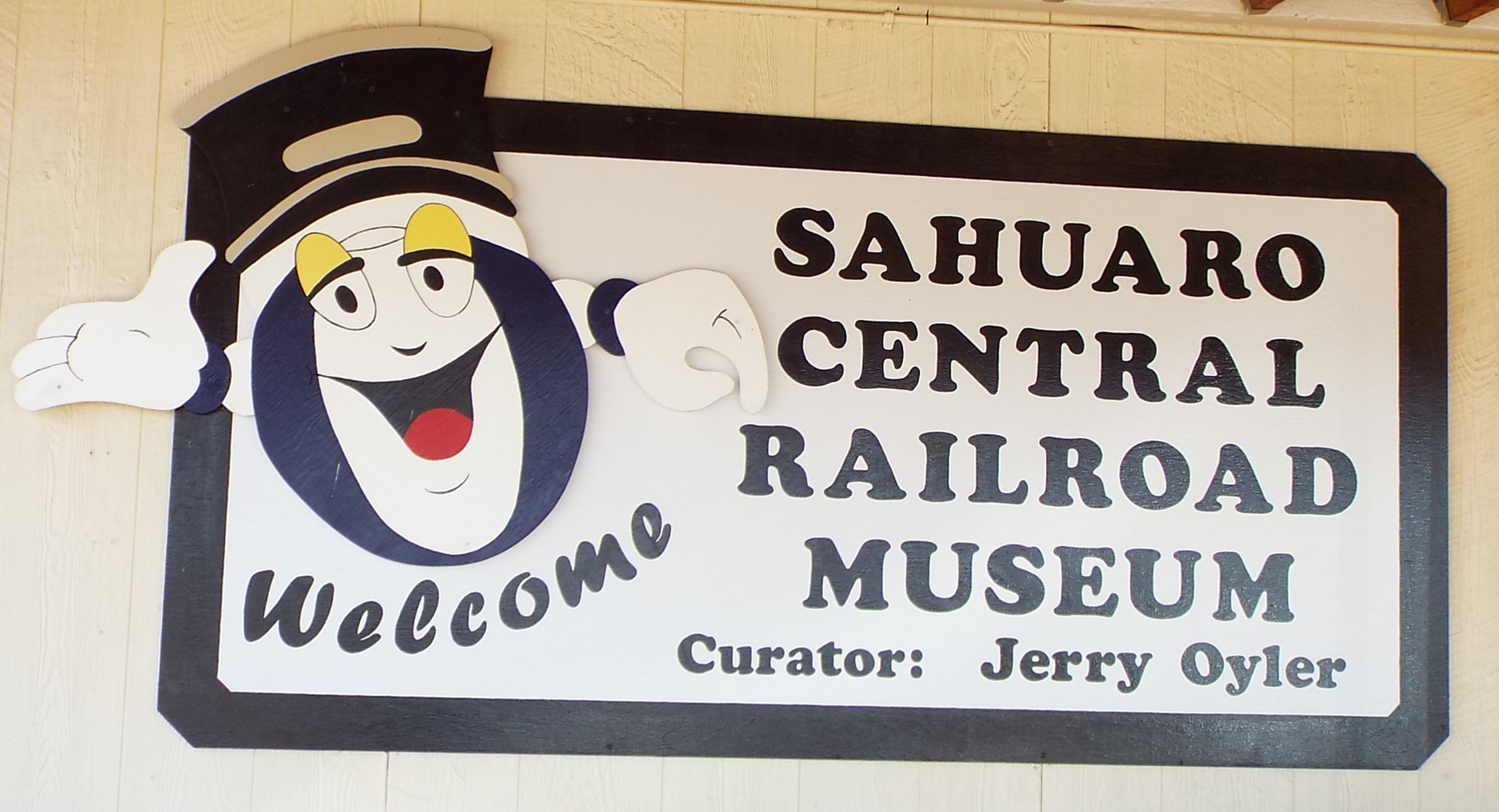
Welcome to Sahuaro Central Railroad Museum

The building which houses the Sahuaro Central headquarters and Sahuaro Central Railroad Museum was once the Park Ranger Station at Adobe Mountain Park. The museum has various exhibits, some which are on loan by the members of the society. These artifacts include train models of different scales, artifacts related to the early years of railroading in Arizona, such as a conductors cap, railroad spikes and lanterns, the bell and headlight of a Porter 0-4-0 18" gauge locomotive and a gift shop. Expansion of the former Ranger Station have been made for meetings and museum operations.

Outside of the museum building there are various steam locomotives on exhibit. One of them is a Porter 0-4-0 is an 18" gauge locomotive that was once used as a copper mining locomotive. Built in Pittsburgh, Pennsylvania in 1887, this locomotive was operated by the Detroit Copper Company at their Morenci, Arizona mine. Another one is a restored mini H.J. Ottaway steam engine built in Wichita, Kansas. Also, on the grounds are four Japanese Internment Camp houses from Leupp, Flagstaff. These houses were built in 1943.

=== The Arizona Model Railroading Society (AMRS) ===
Next to the museum building is a twenty by thirty foot (3000 sq. ft.) metal Arizona Model Railroading Society building whose construction was financed by the Sahuaro Central. The building is home to the Huntley HO train layout and to layouts of Arizona Model Railroading Society G, N. and O scales.

=== The Maricopa Live Steamers (MLS) ===
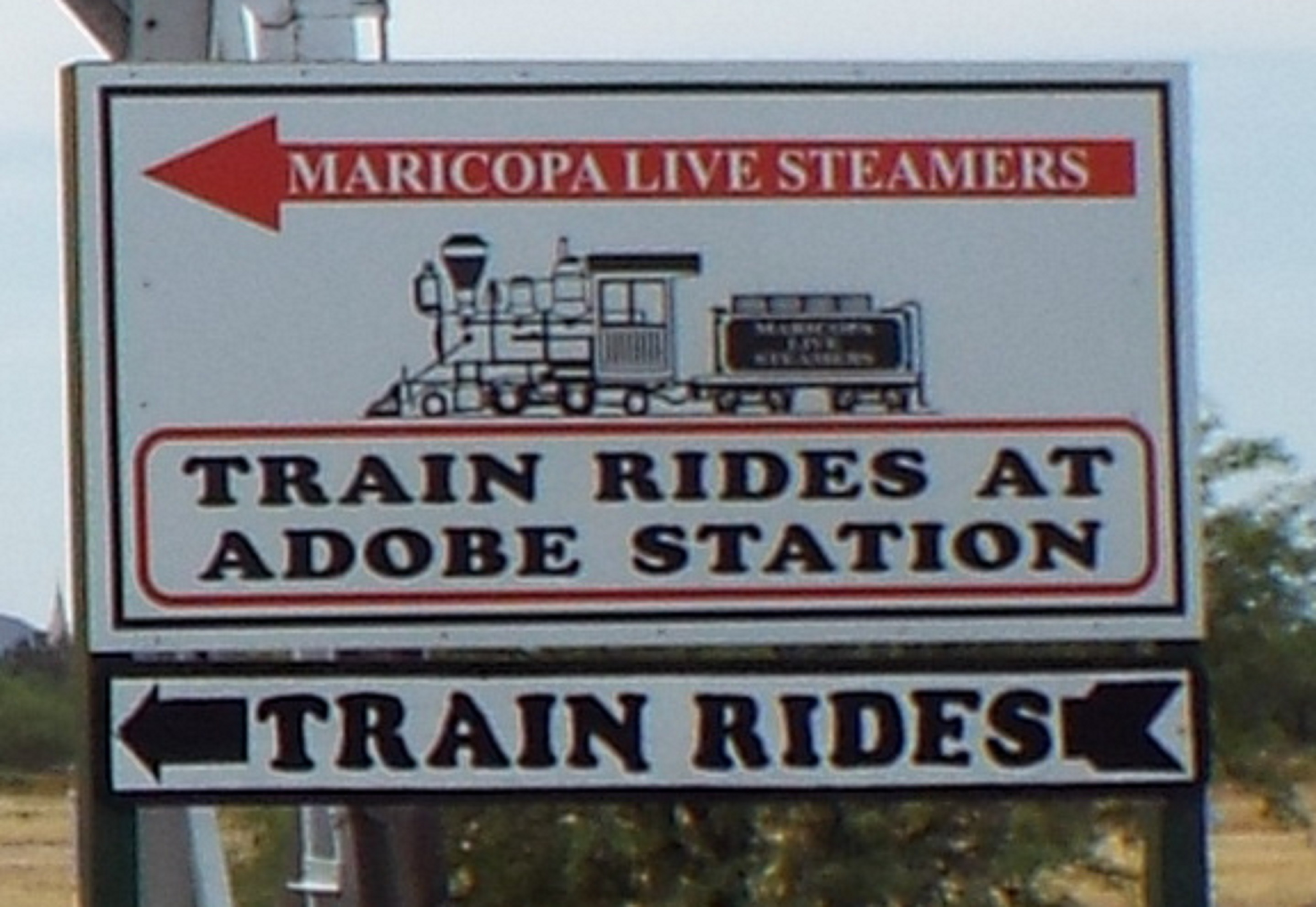
Sign leading to the free rides in Adobe Station

The Maricopa Live Steamers organization (MLS) is the oldest of its kind in Arizona. MLS currently owns multiple 7 1/2" gauge train engines, around 50 riding cars, and 20 other cars. From 1996 through 1999, MLS created three miles of track which was placed outside the Sahuaro Central museum. A loop of the track was built around the museum in 1998. As of 2022, MLS has more than 18 miles of 7 1/2" gauge tracks plus 1500 feet of 4 3/4" track. MLS provides free train rides on Sundays during the months of October through April (As of 2019). The train rides begin in Adobe Station and run through the rugged desert. There are 6 routes, although typically only up to 4 are used for the public train rides due to the length of the rides. There are working block signals, many bridges, trestles, and Teeny Tiny Tunnel. In 2012 Shelby's Junior Engineer School began operation in Adobe Train Station, where children of all ages can operate an electric powered 1.5" scale model of a diesel switcher loco. MLS's Arizona Western Railroad is one of the largest miniature railroad setup of its kind in the United States. MLS also created an old 1890 western themed town with false fronts on their storage units.

== Images of the Adobe Mountain Desert Park ==
The following photographs are of The Sahuaro Central Railroad Museum, the Arizona Model Railroading Society (AMRS) and the Maricopa Live Steamers (MLS)

The Sahuaro Central Railroad Museum
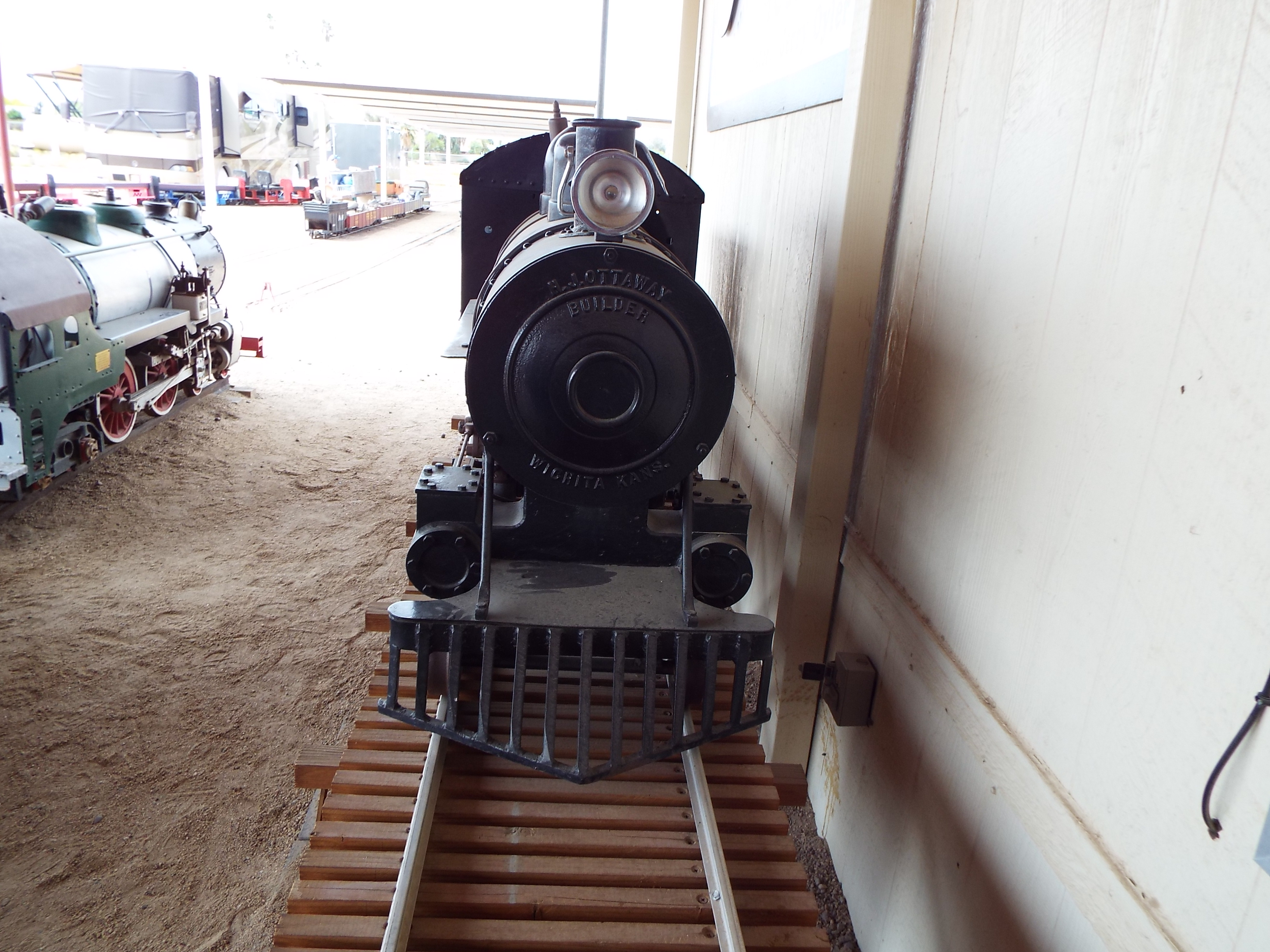
H J Ottaway.

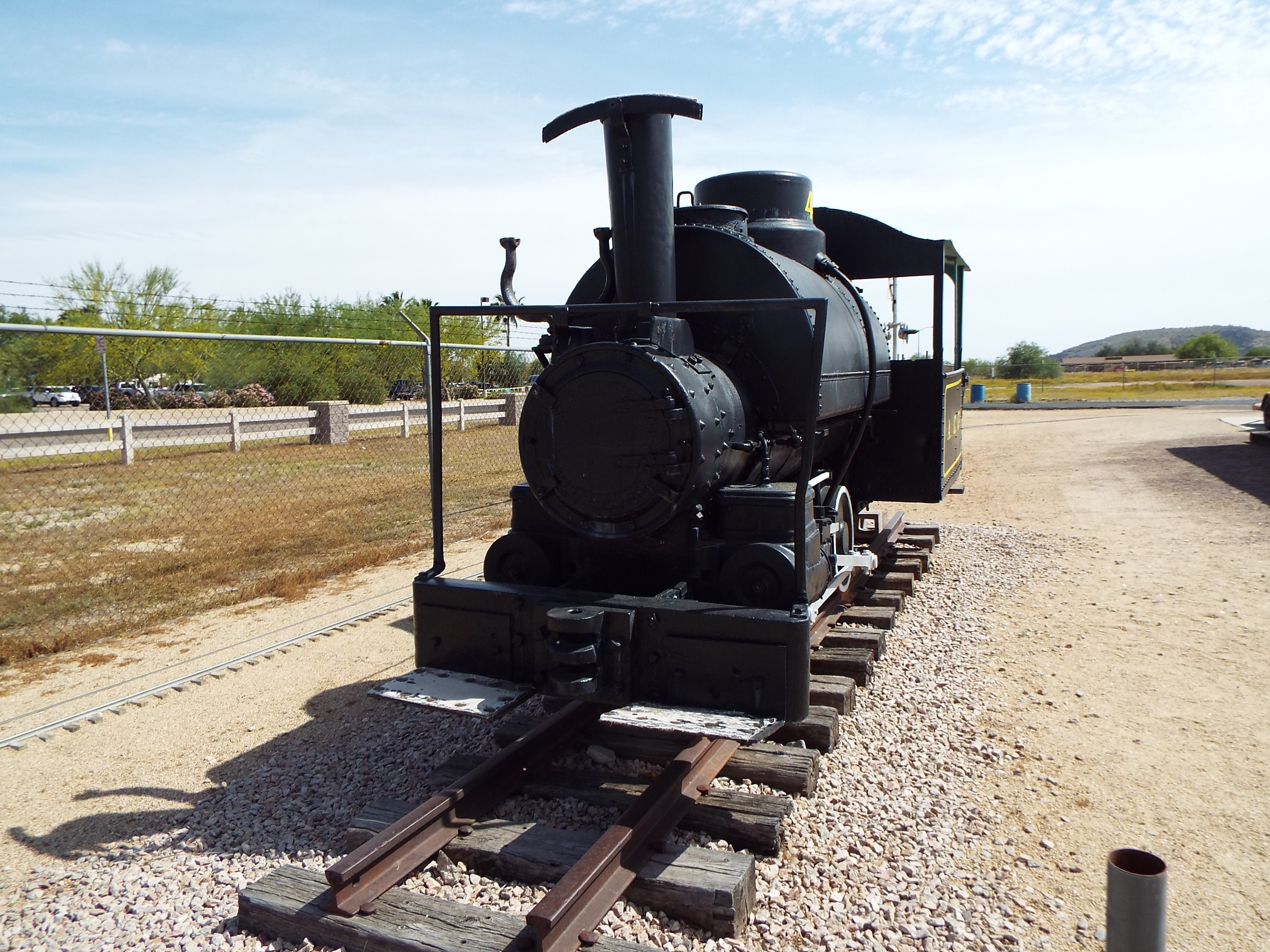
Porter 0-4-0.

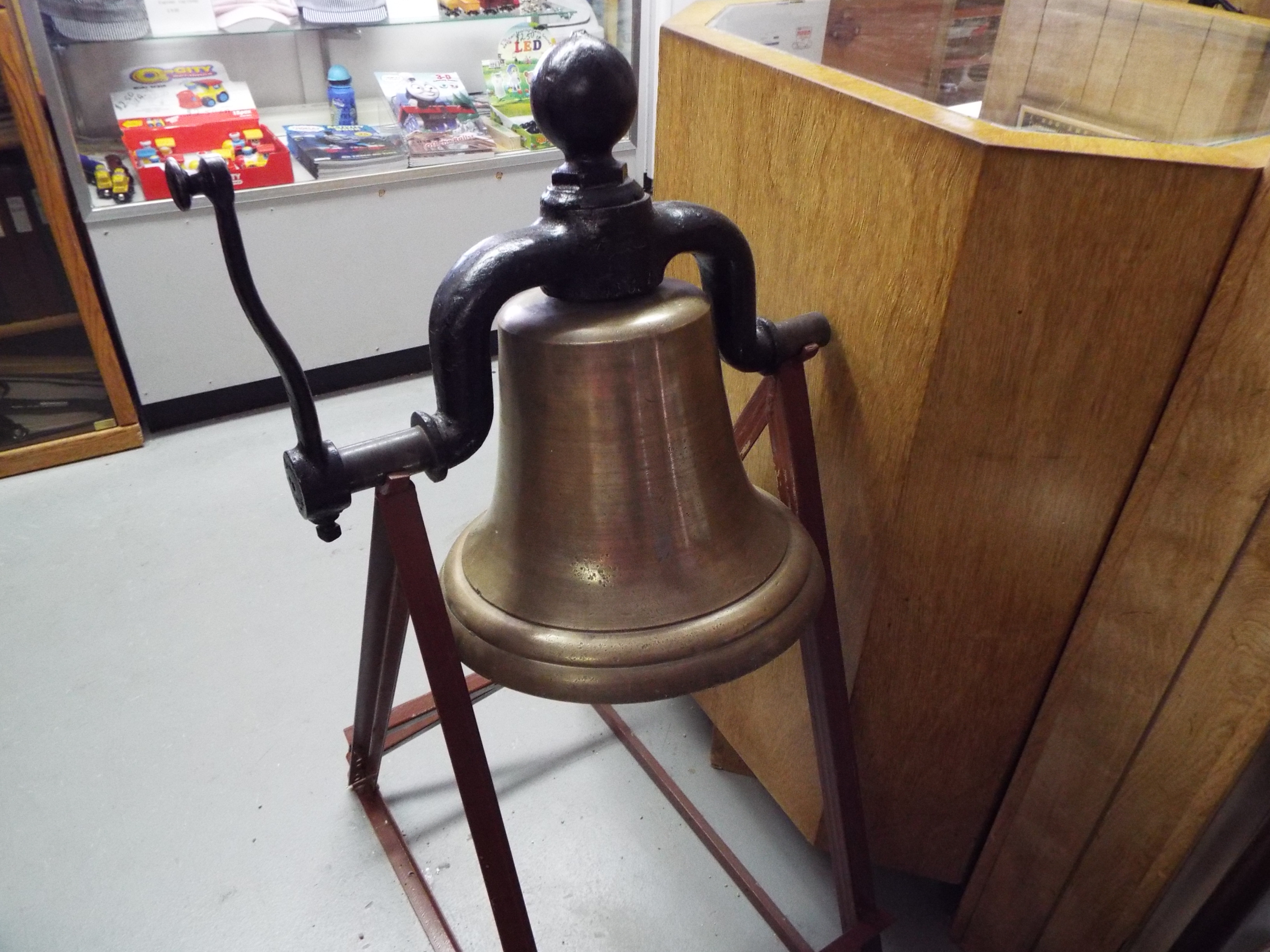
Bell of the Porter 0-4-0.

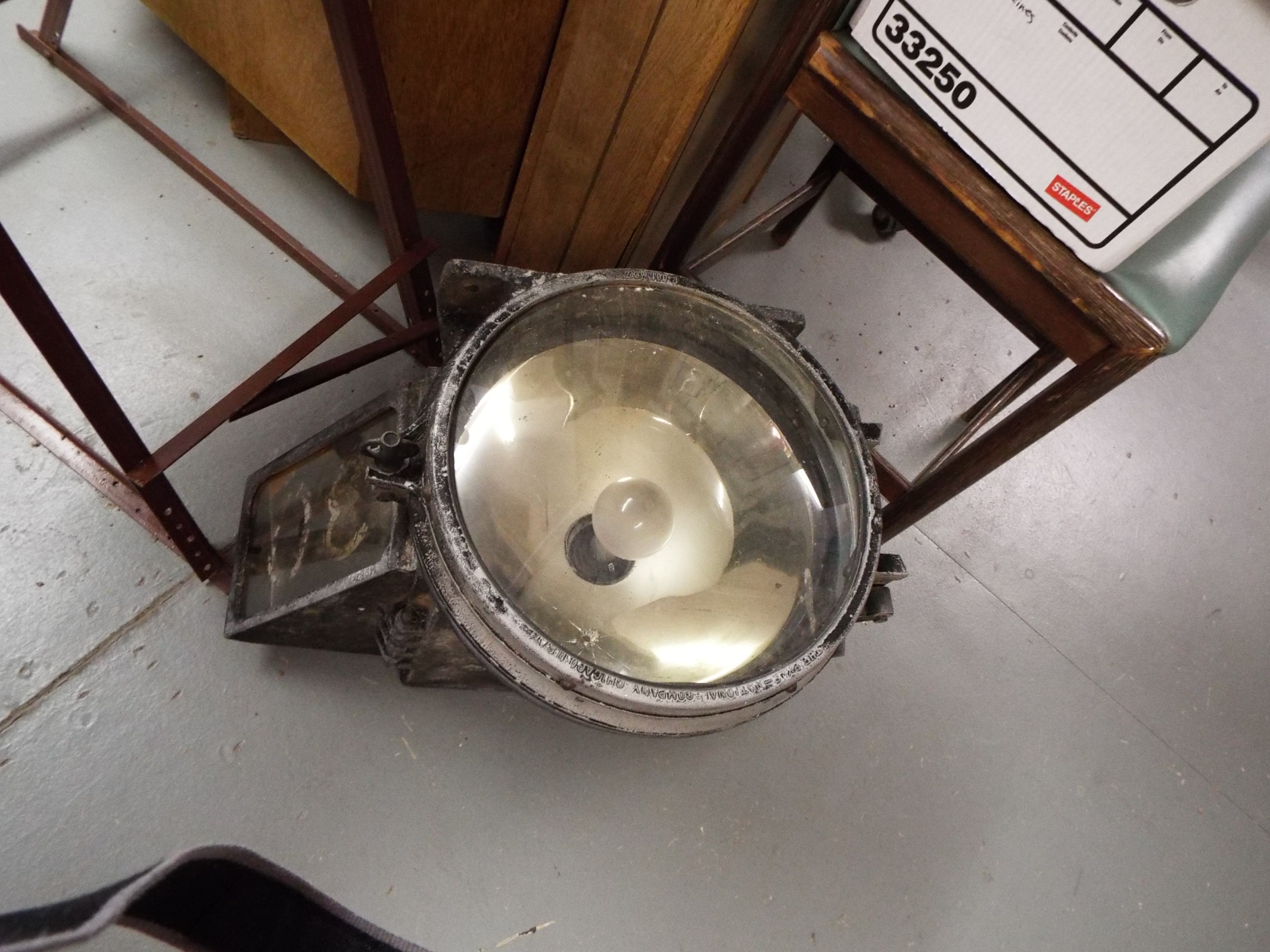
Headlight of the Porter 0-4-0.

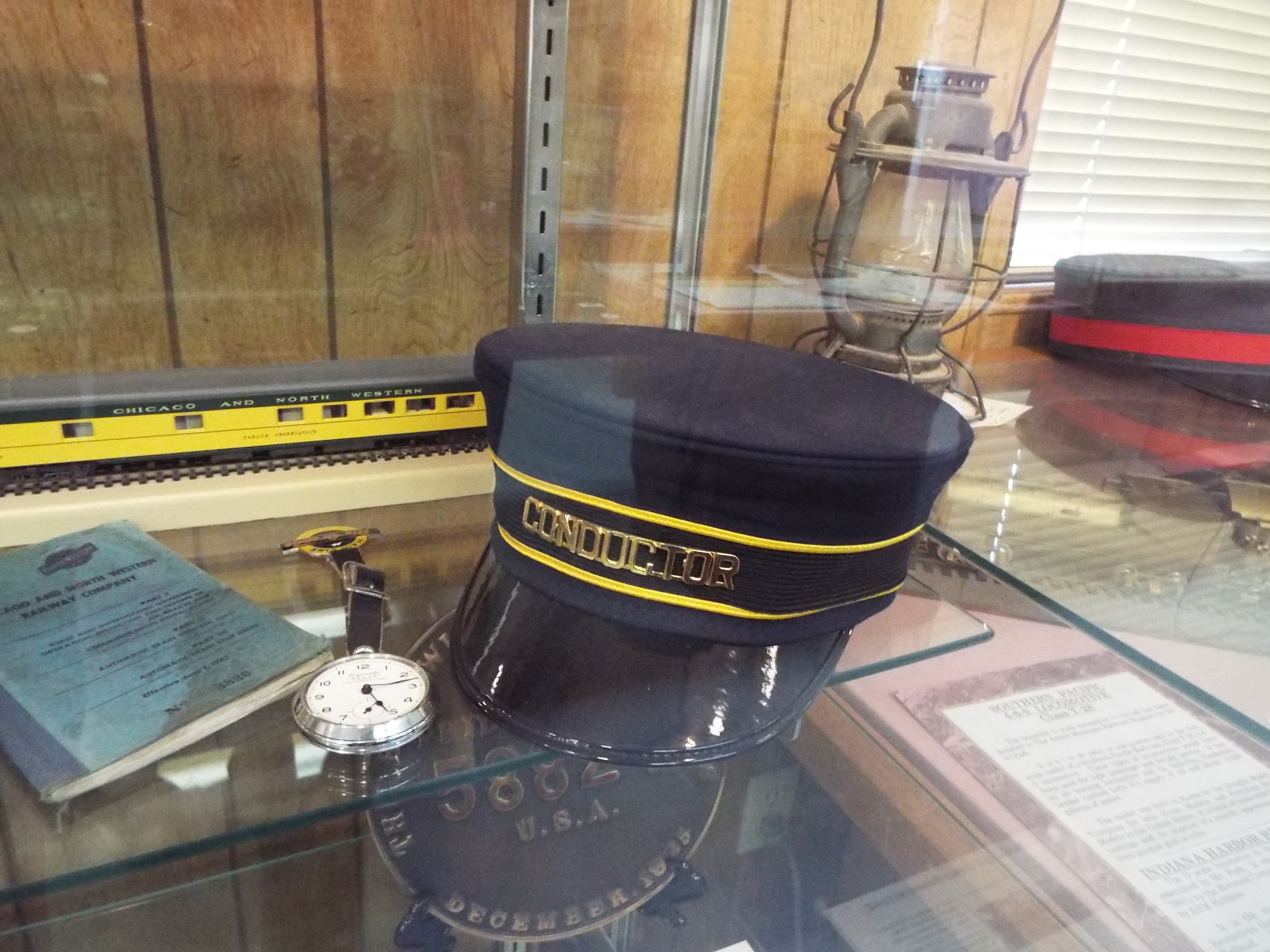
Train conductors hat and watch.

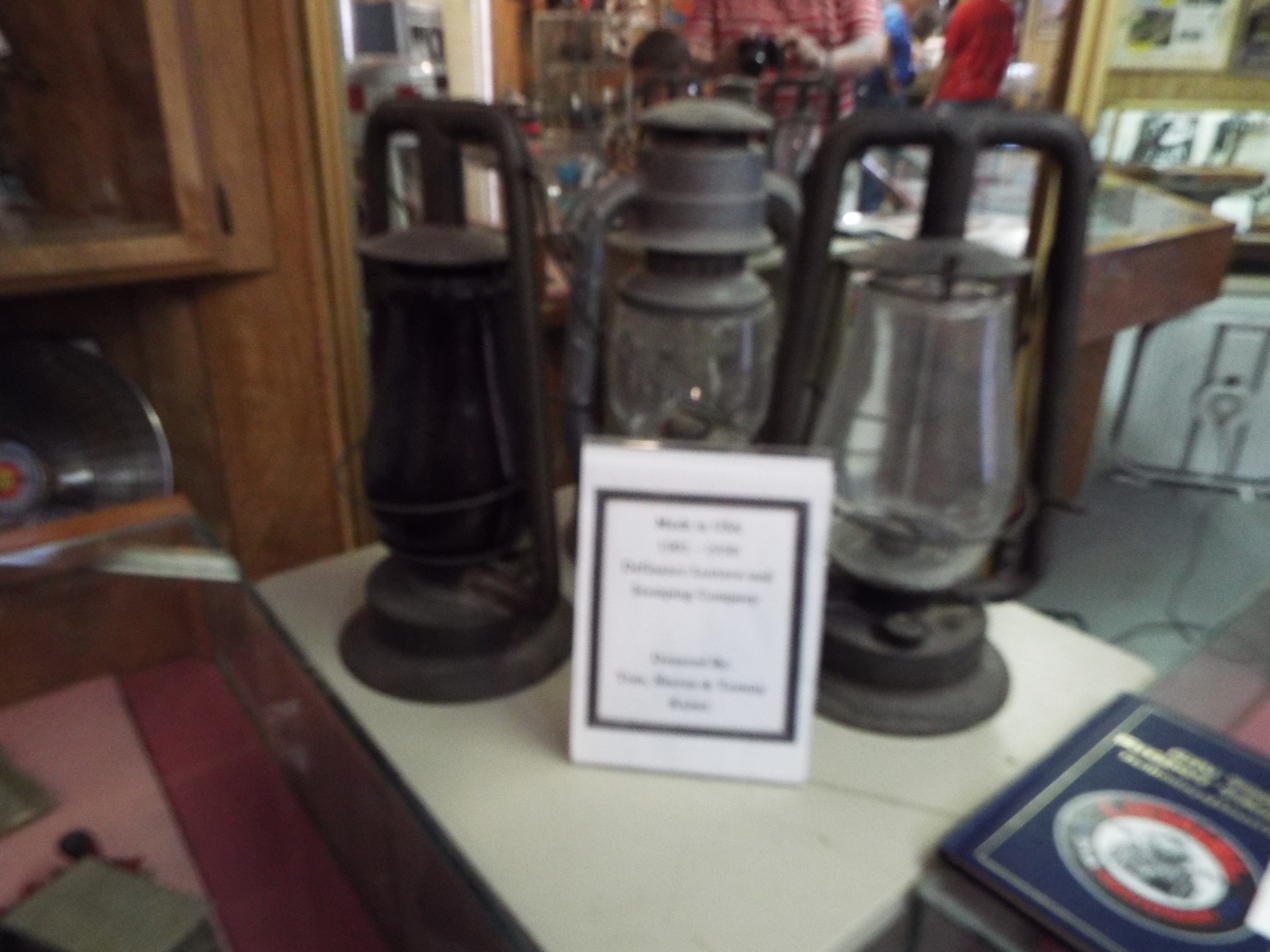
1880s Railroad lanterns.

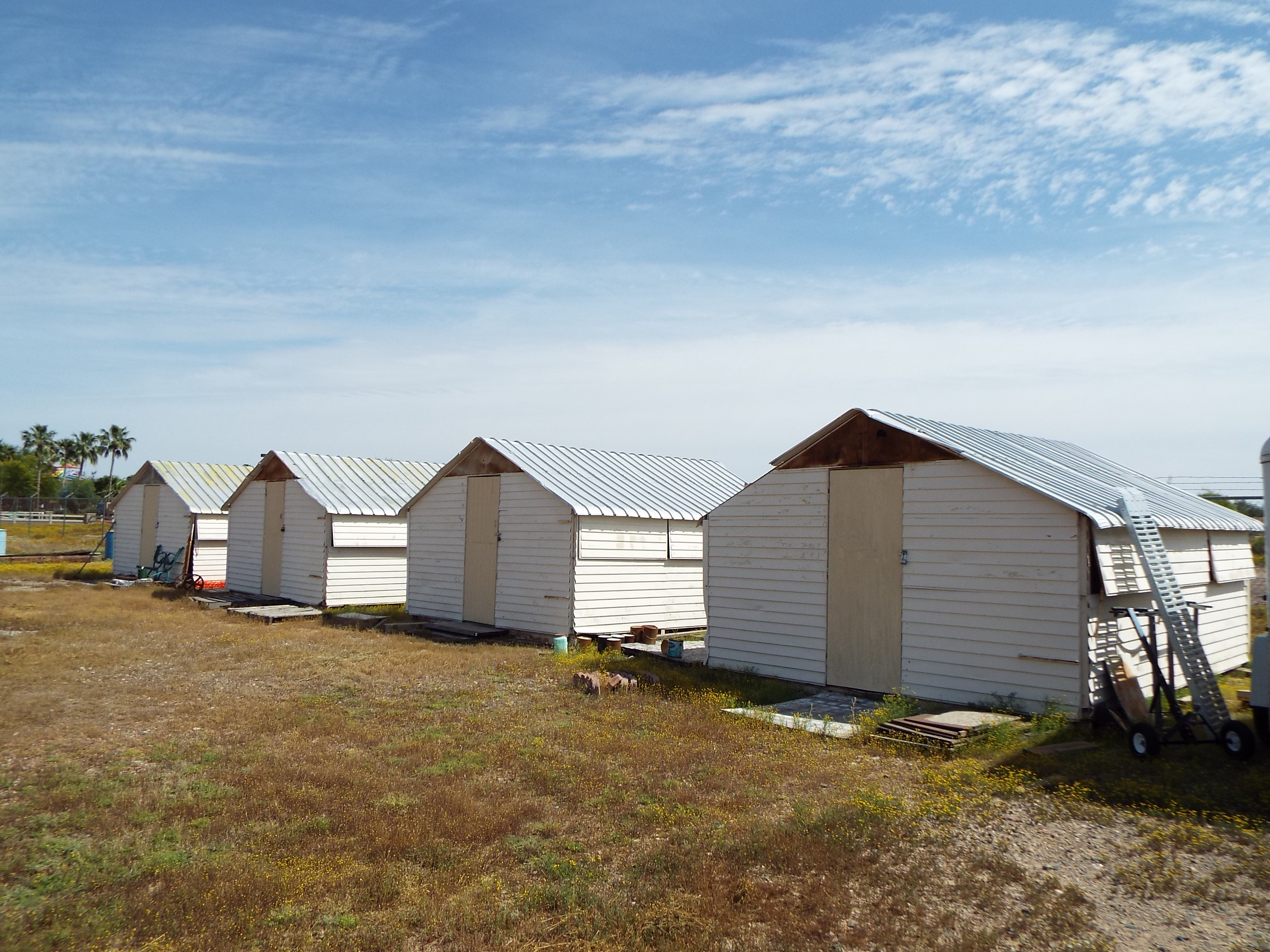
Japanese internment camp houses.
The Arizona Model Railroading Society (AMRS) / Maricopa Live Steamers (MLS)
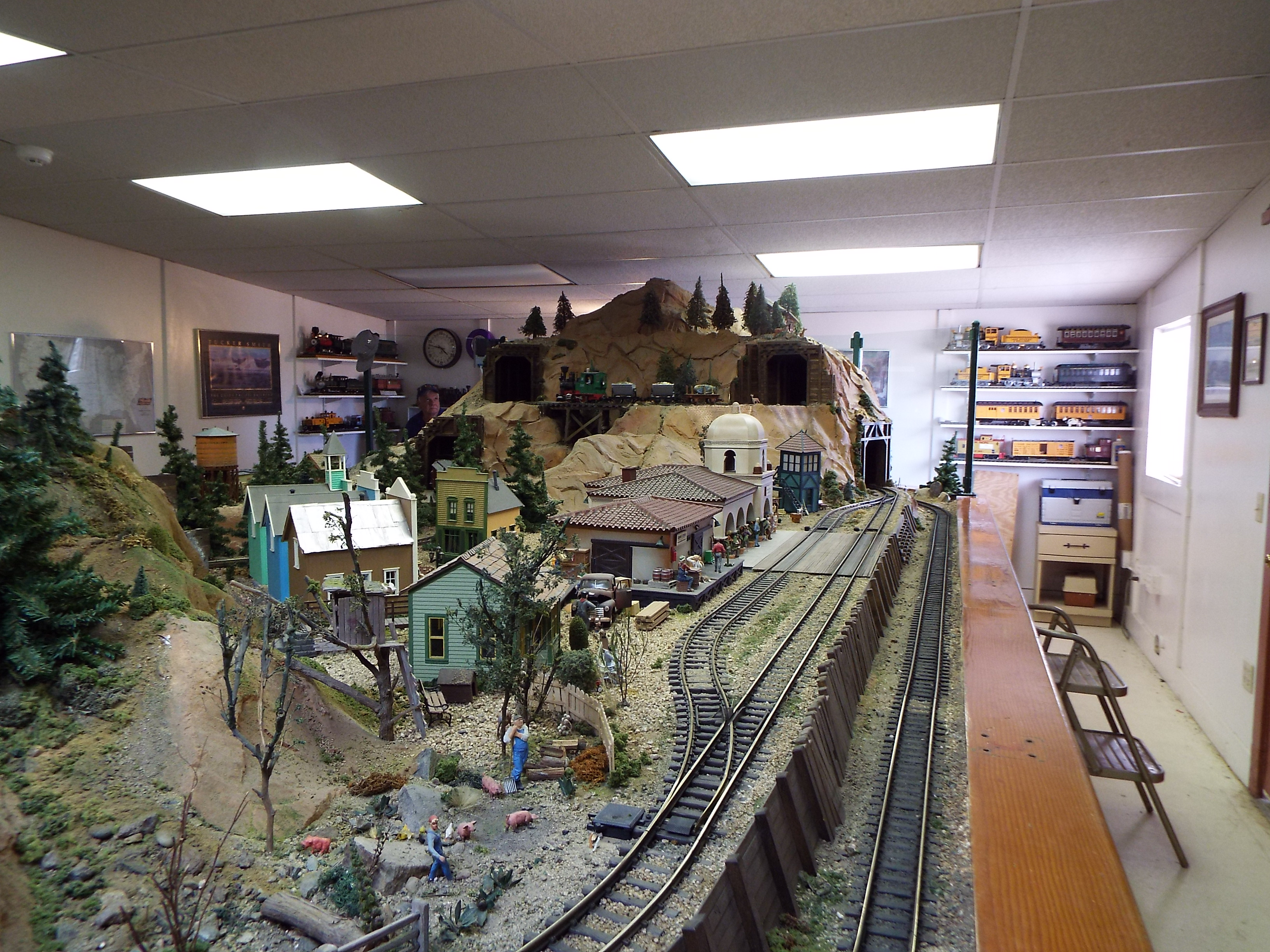
AMRS layout

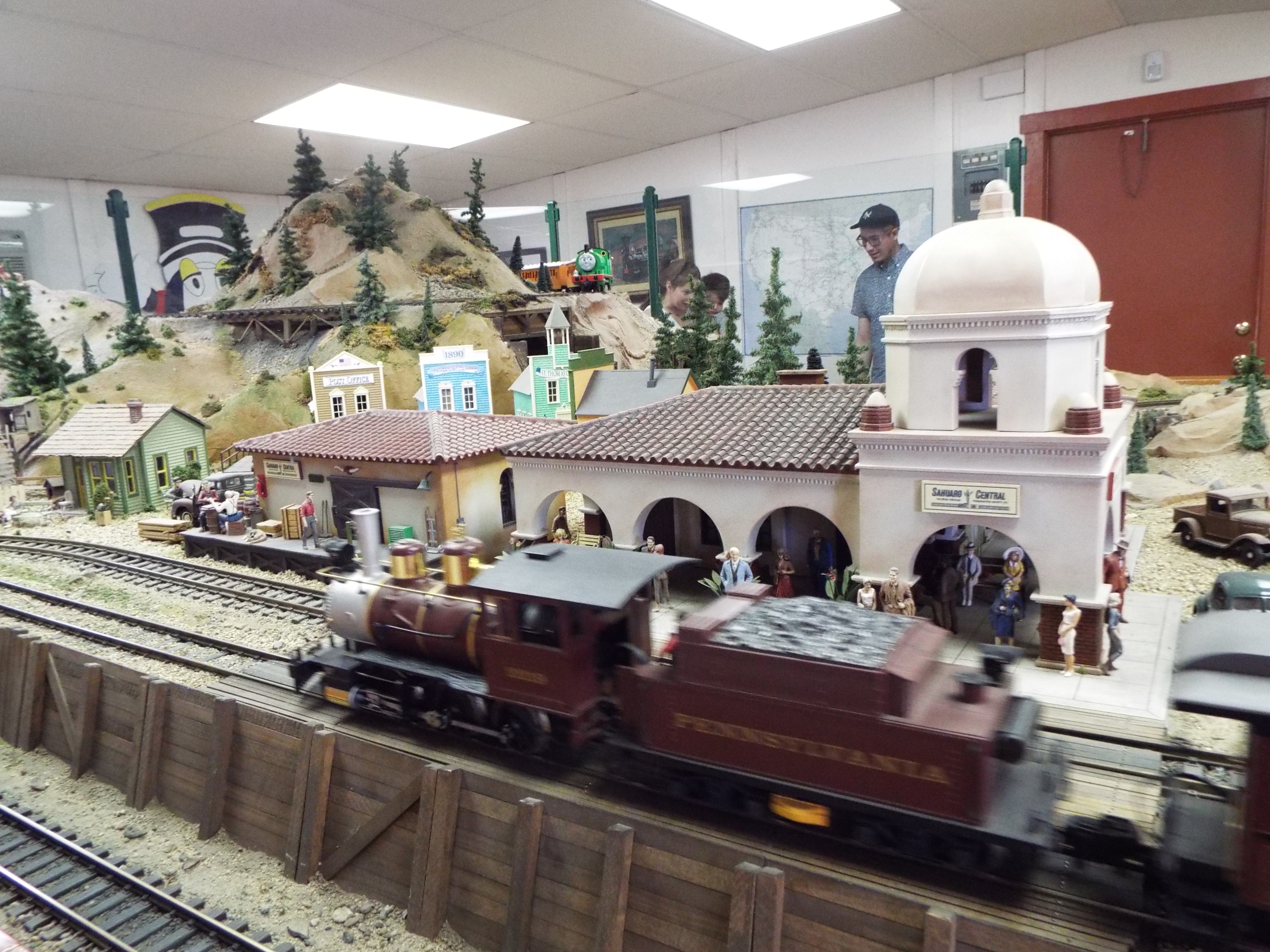
Different view of the AMRS layout.

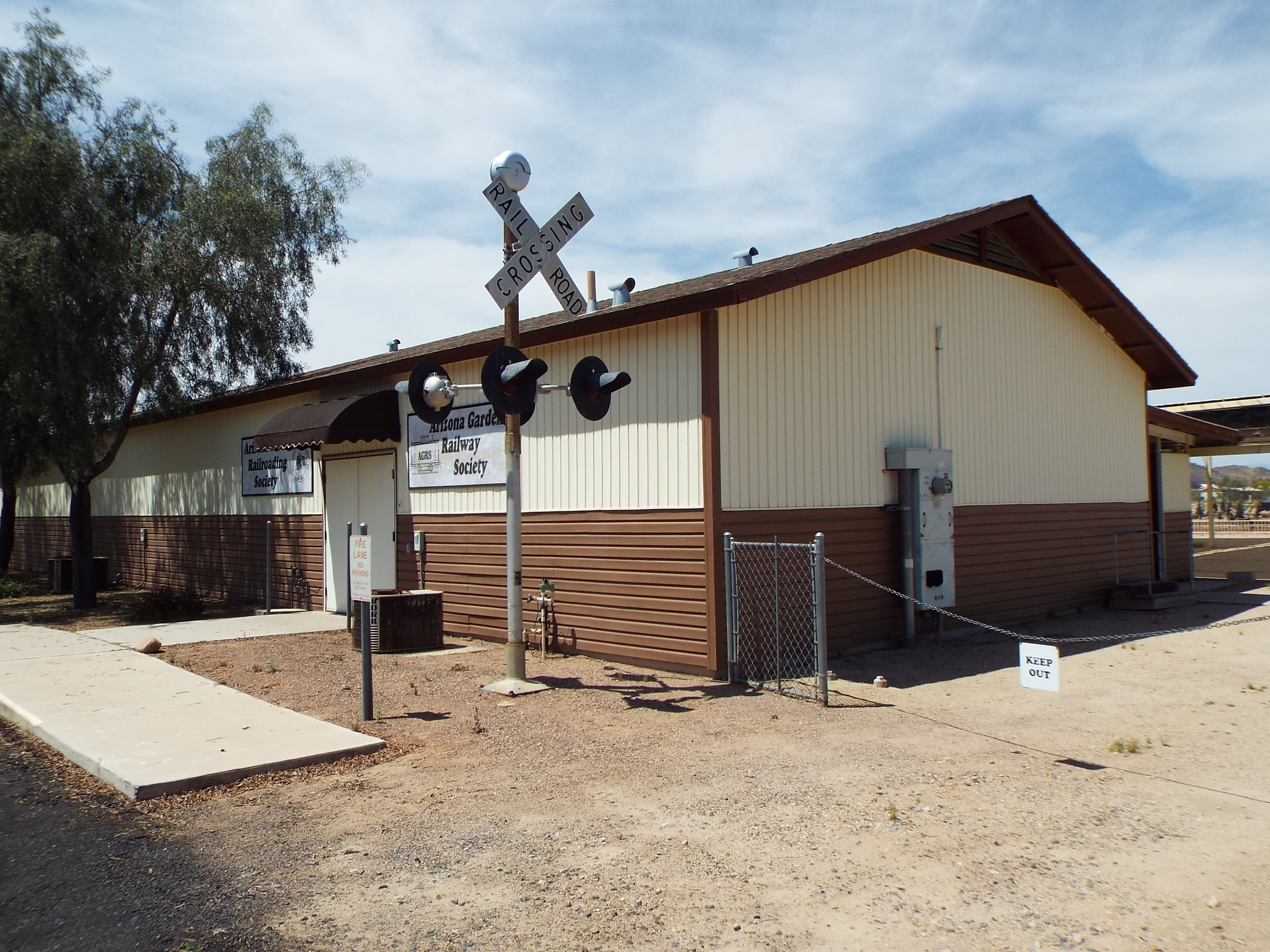
The Arizona Model Railroading Society/Arizona Garden Railway Society (AMRS) headquarters.

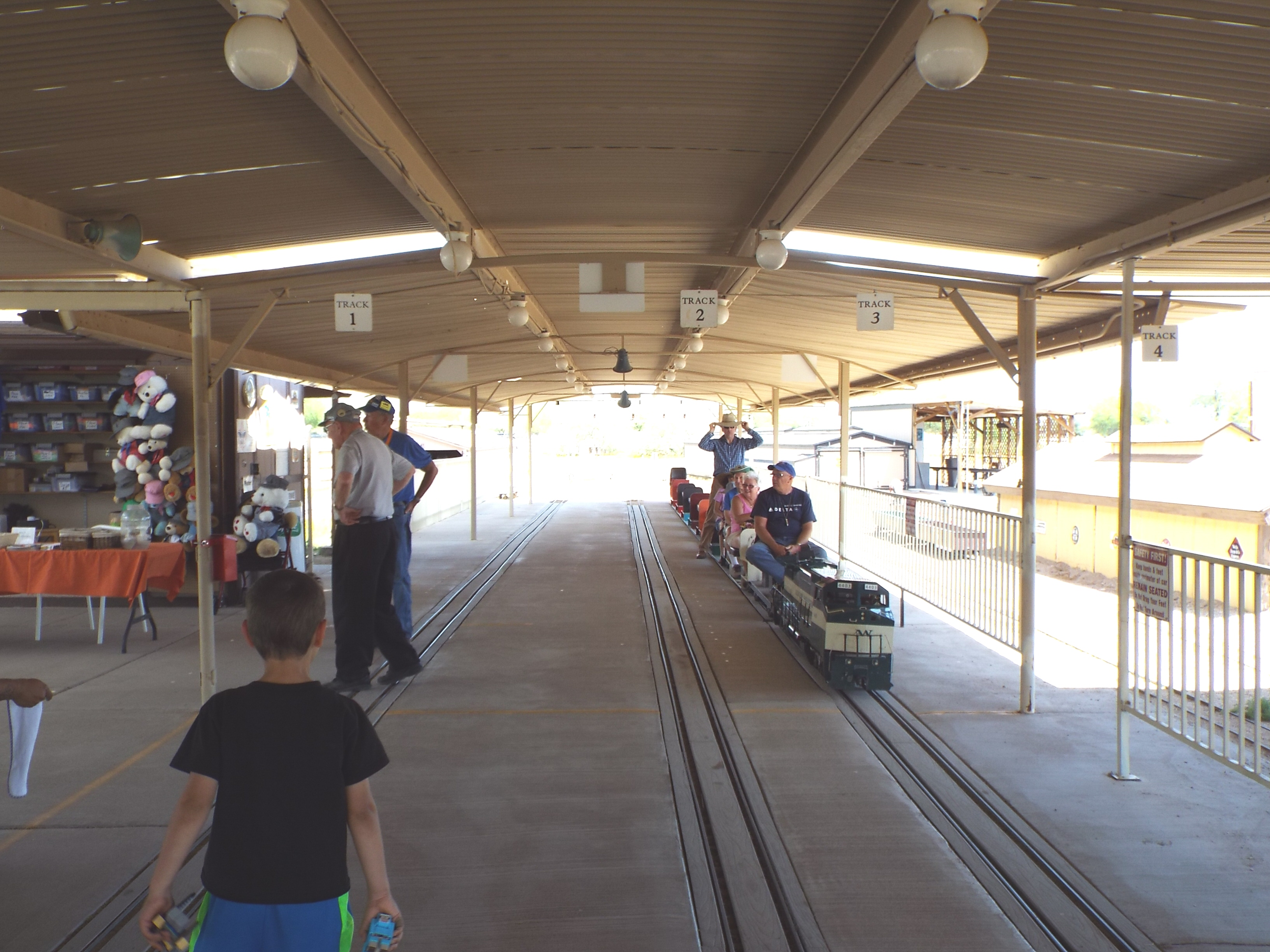
Adobe Station.

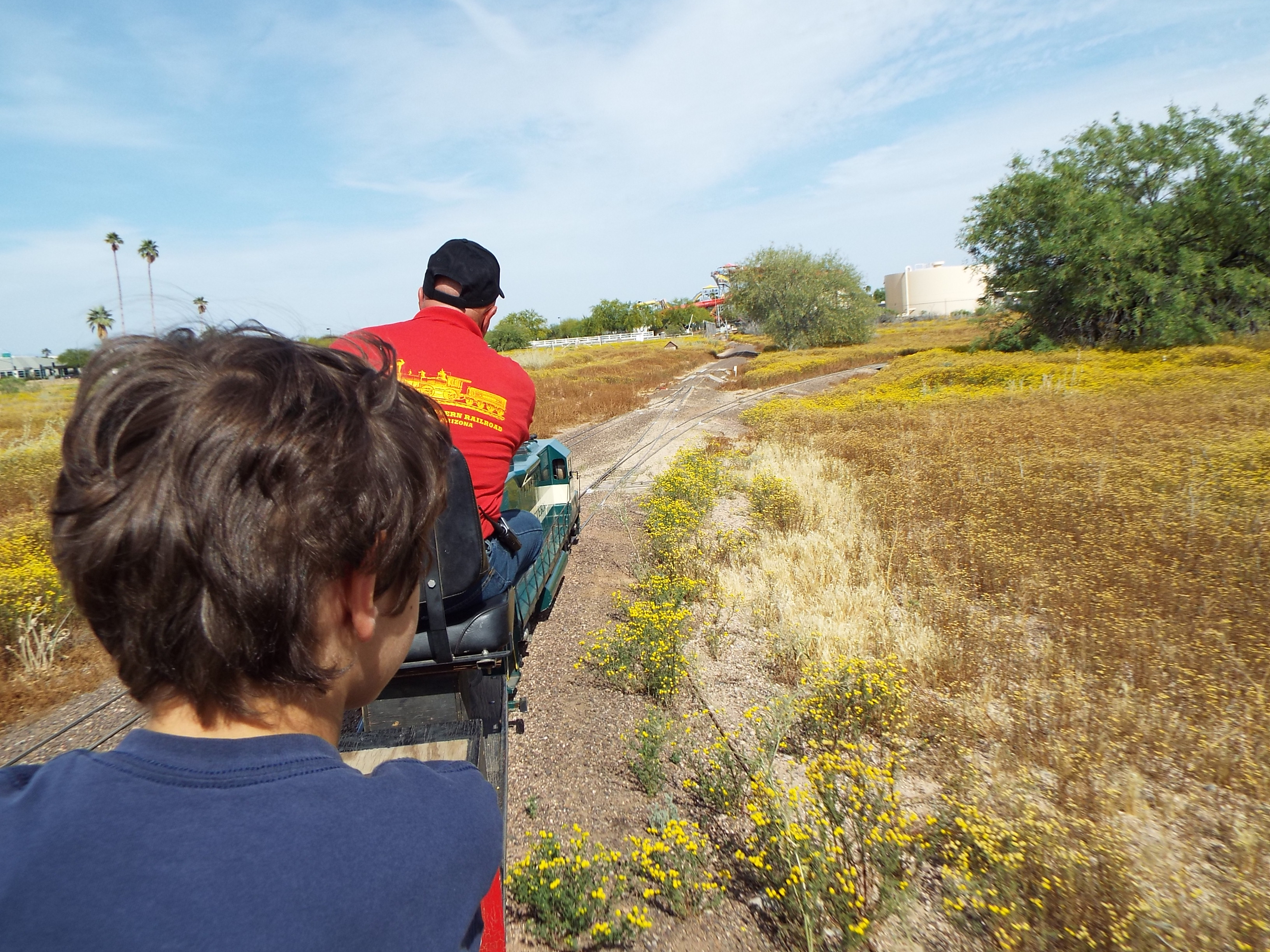
Free train ride.

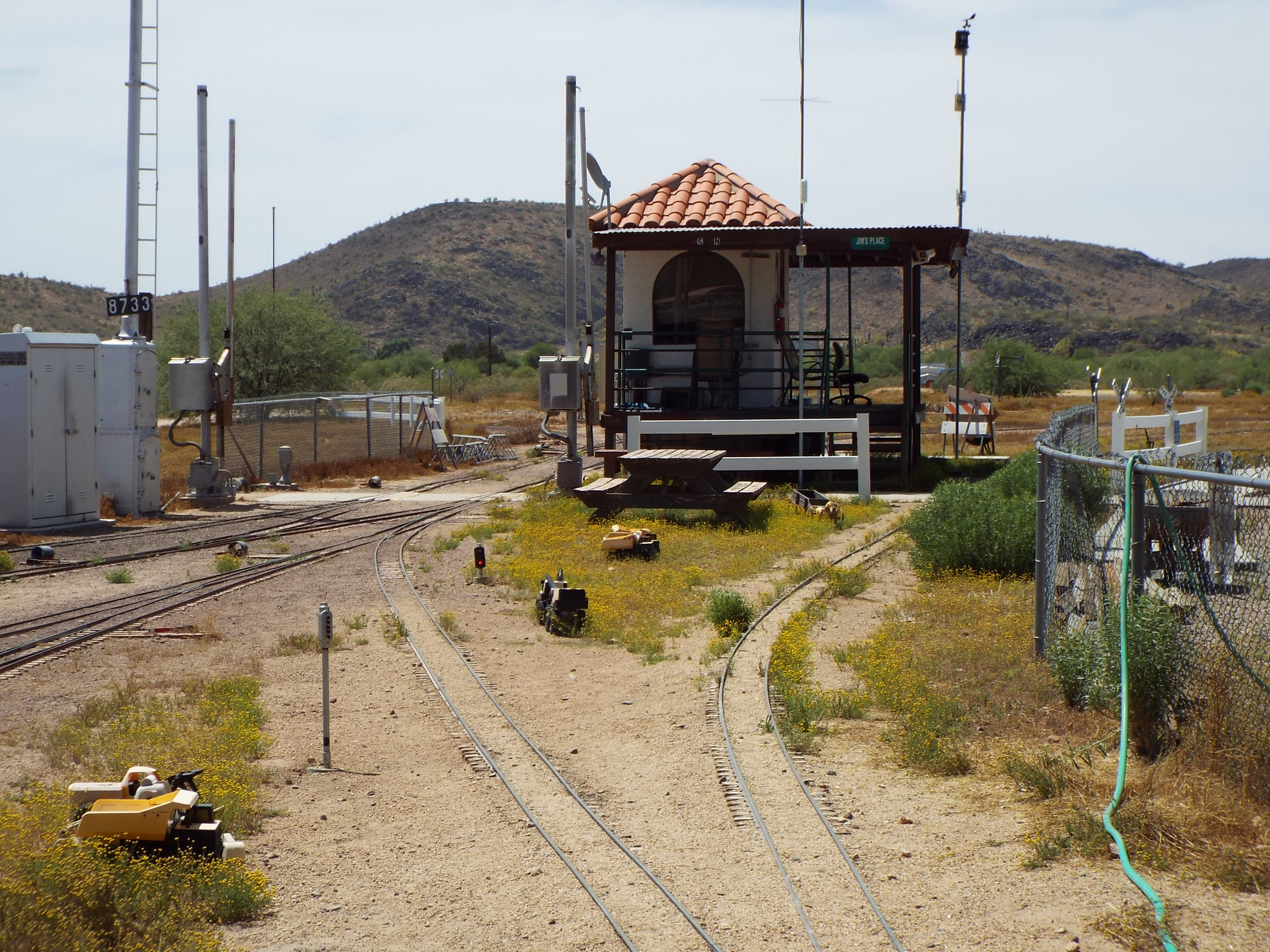
MLS Tower.

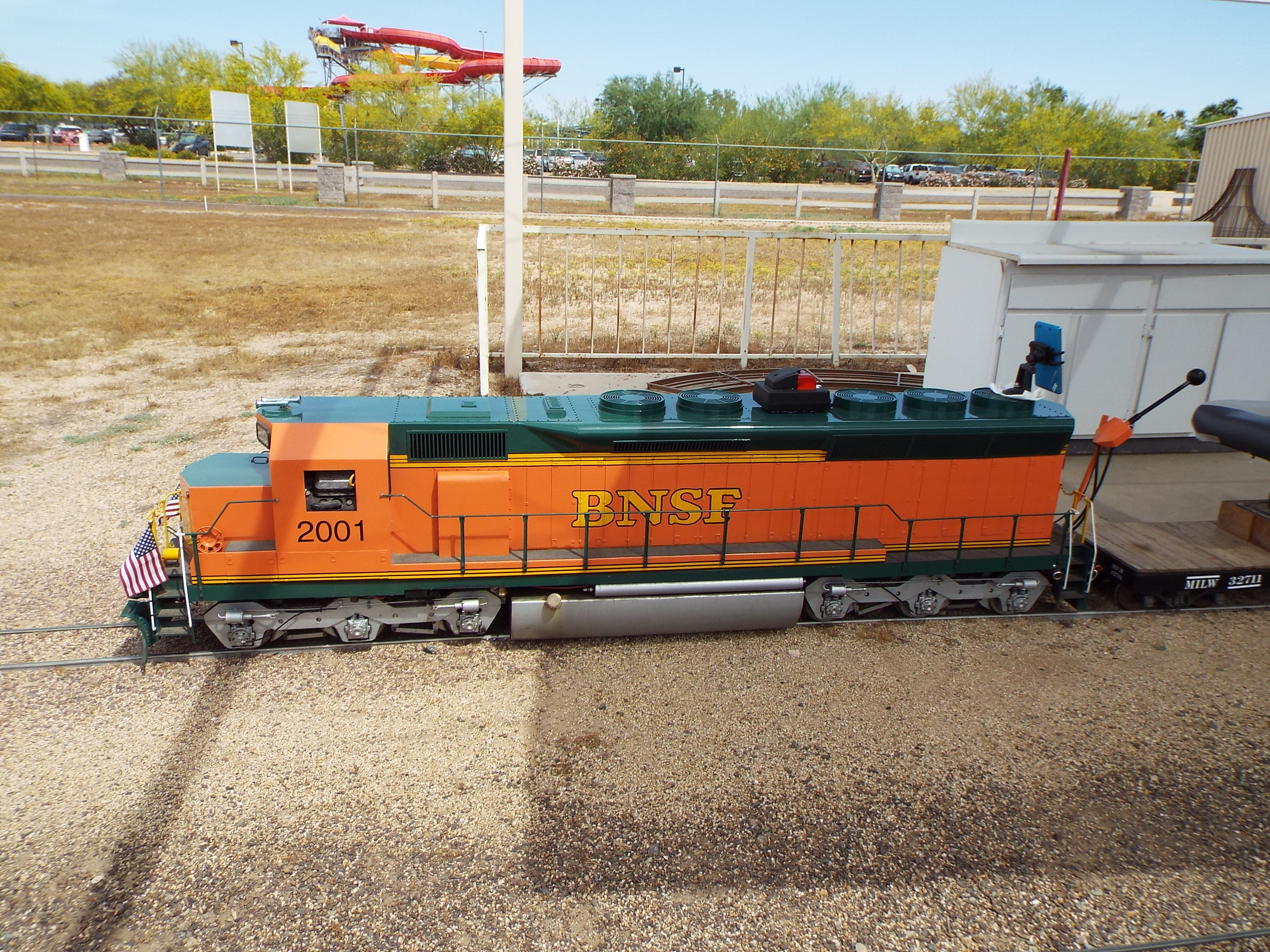
7 1/2" gauge train engine.

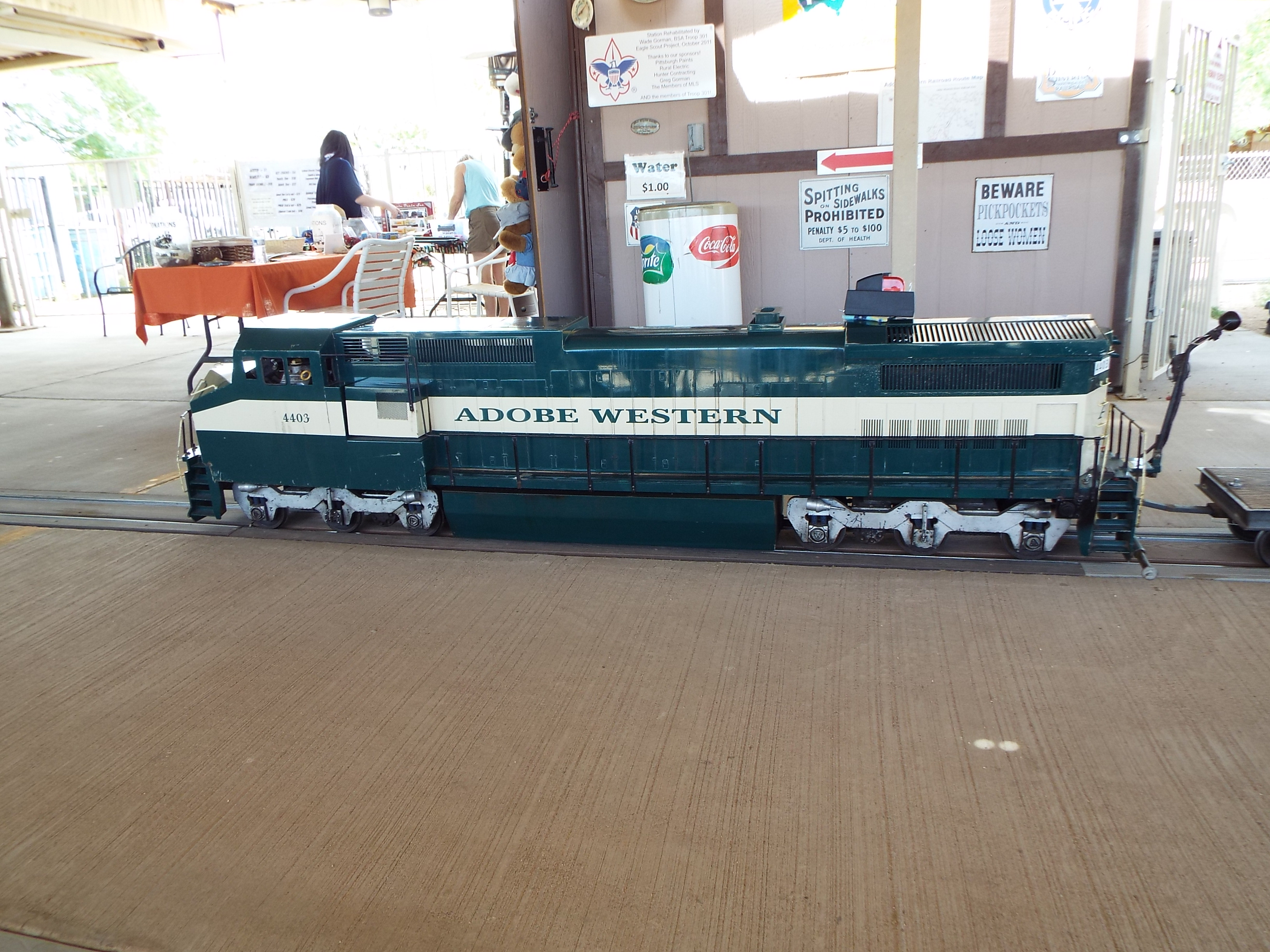
Another 7 1/2" gauge train engine.

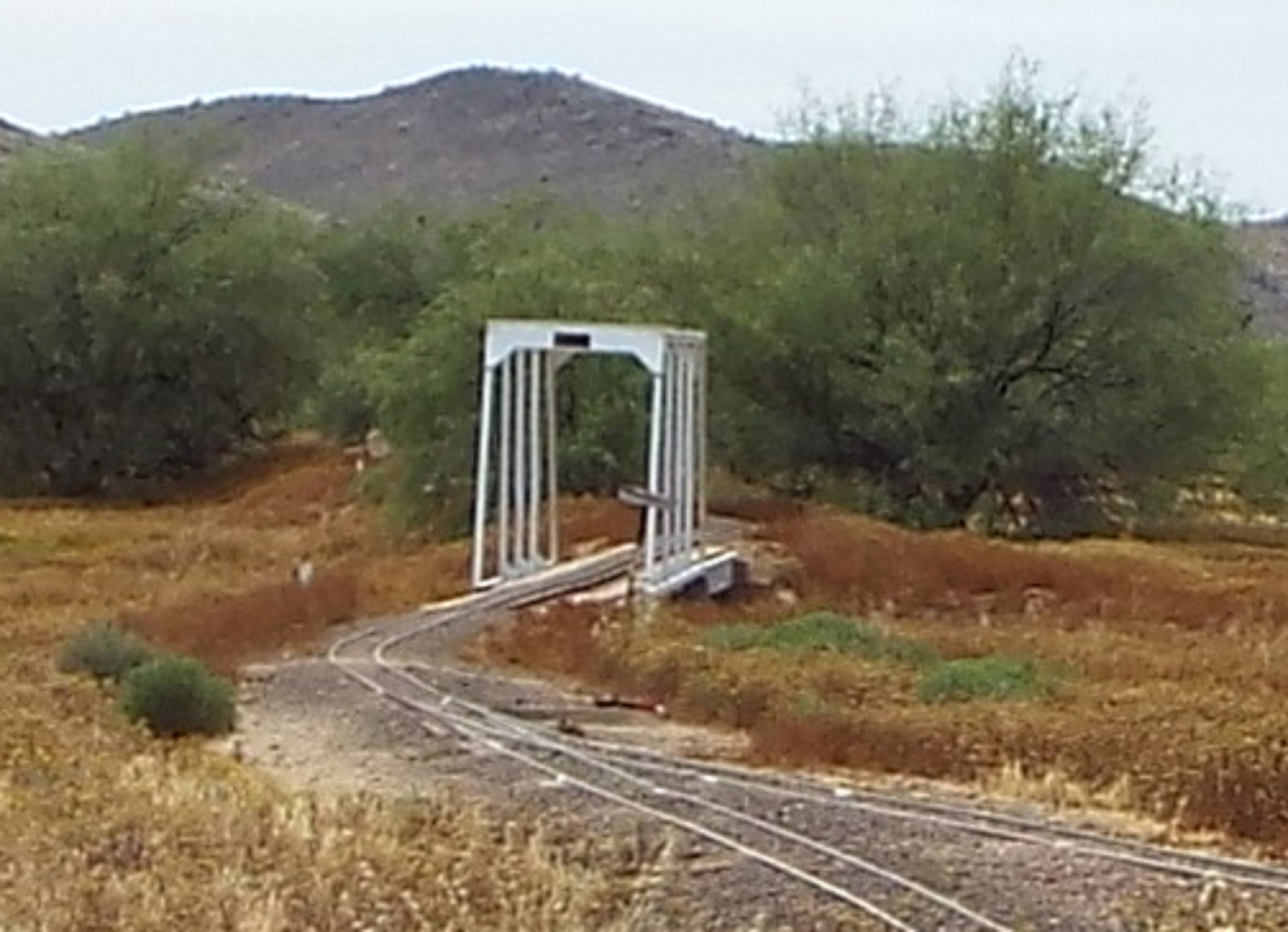
Bridge.

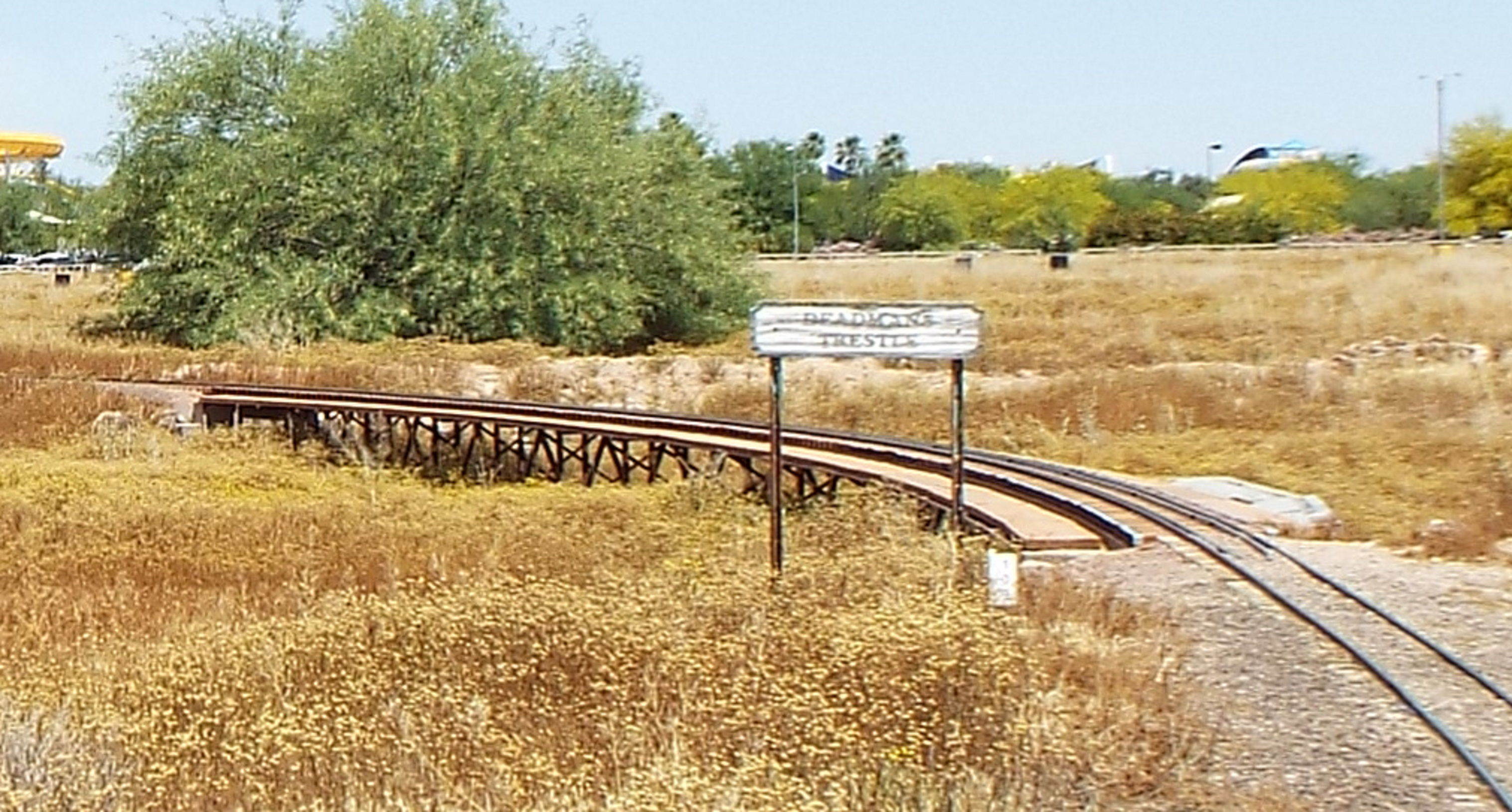
Trestle bridge.

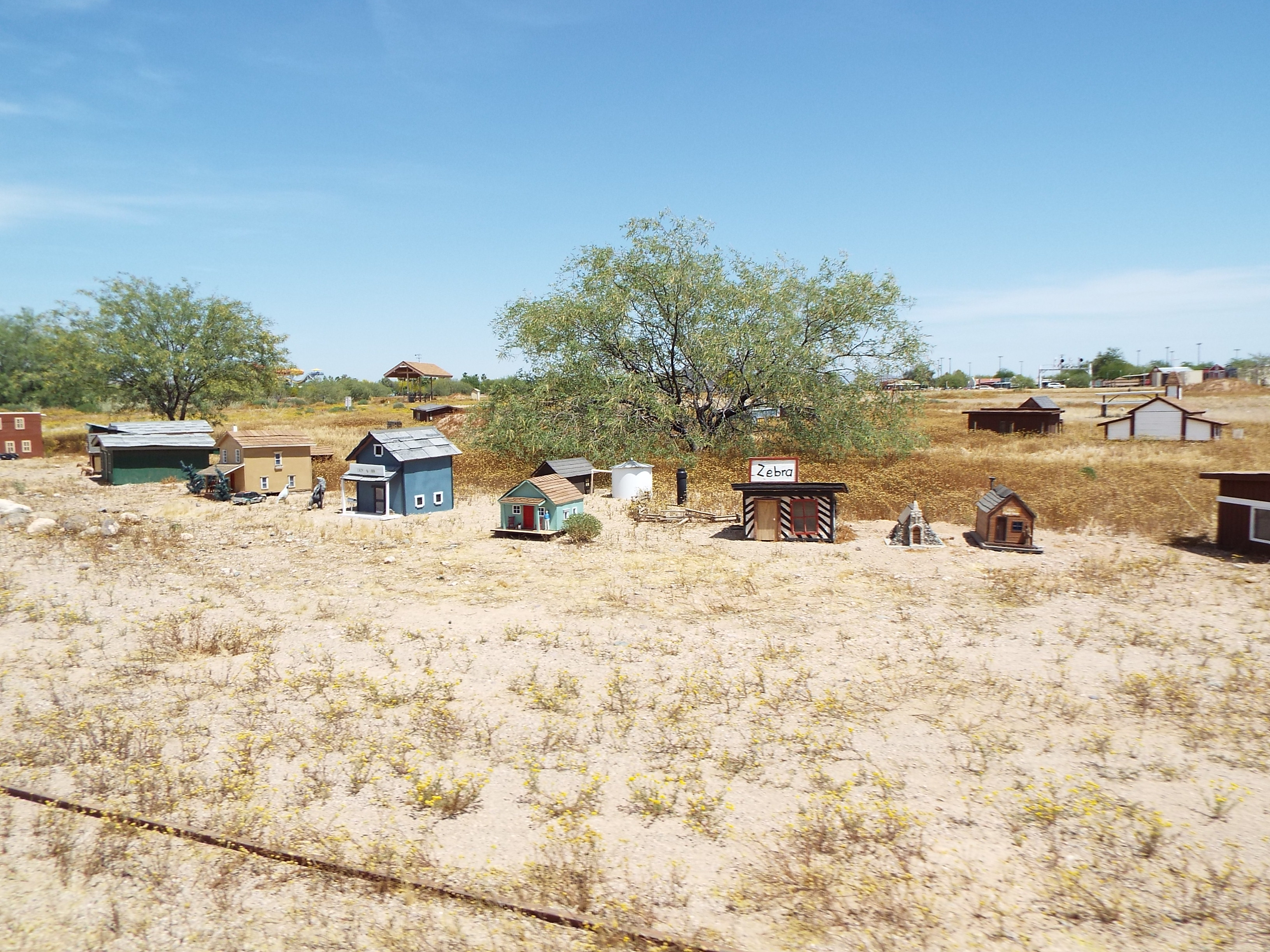
Little village layout.

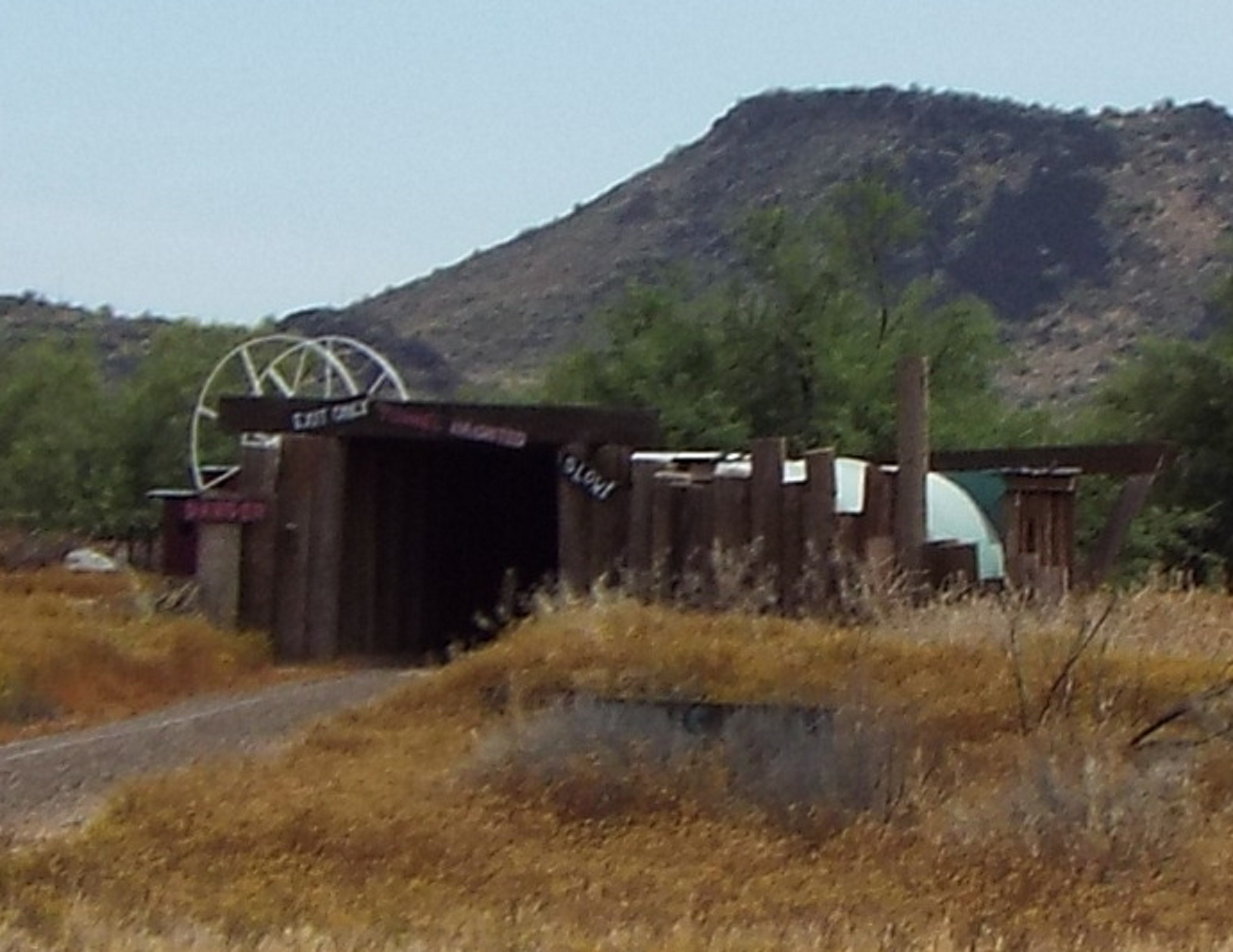
Tunnel.

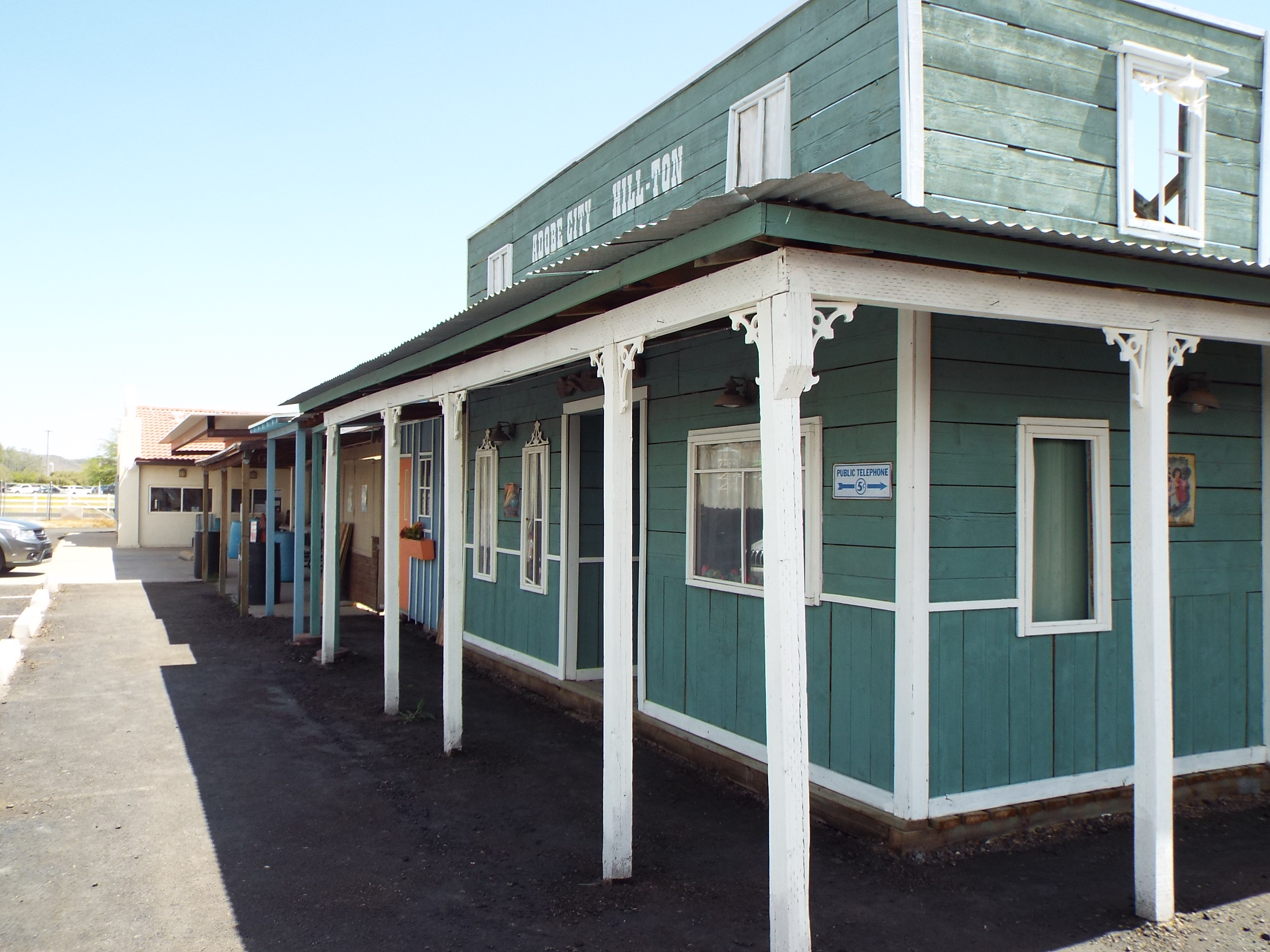
Western layout.

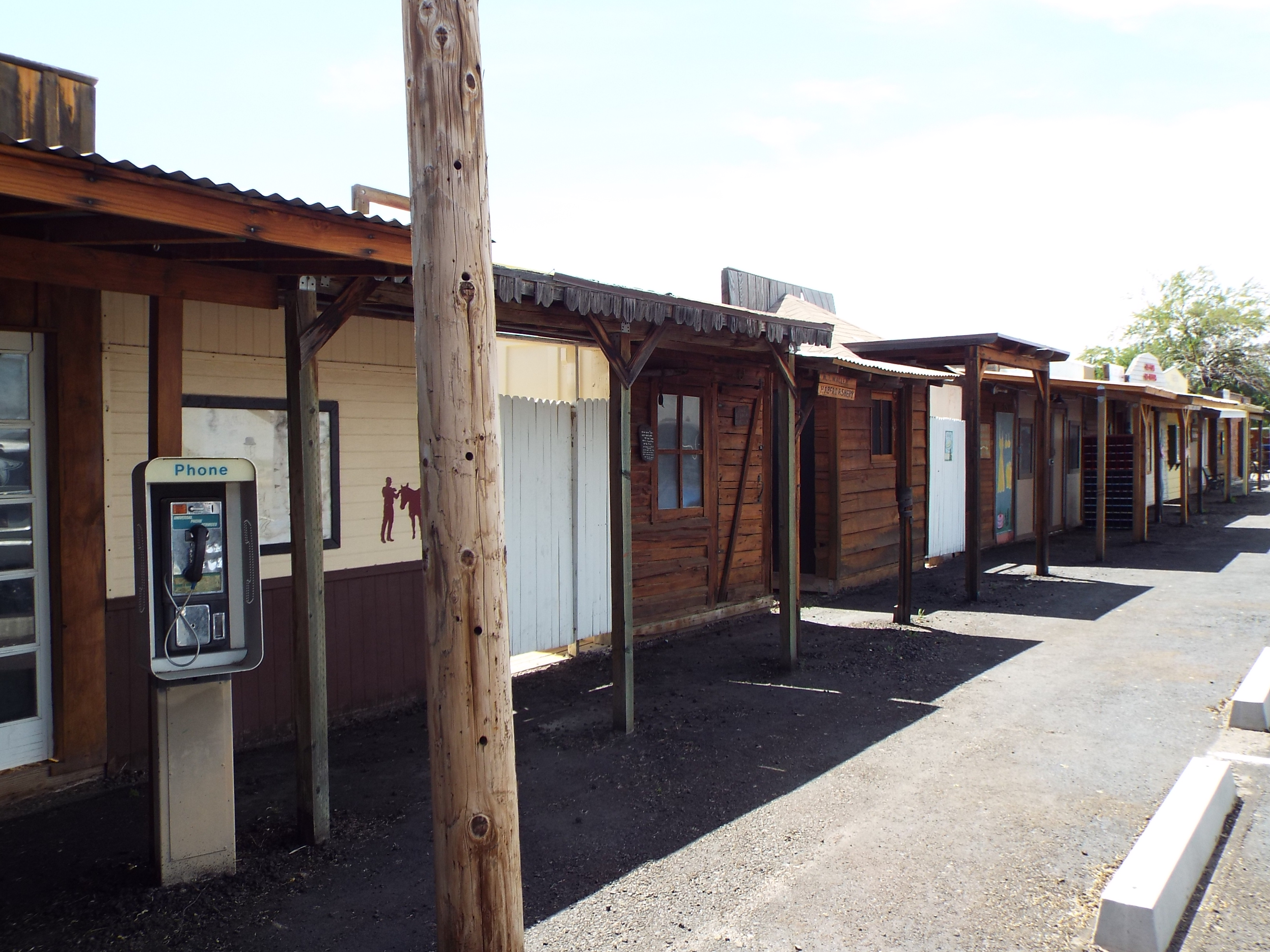
Western layout.

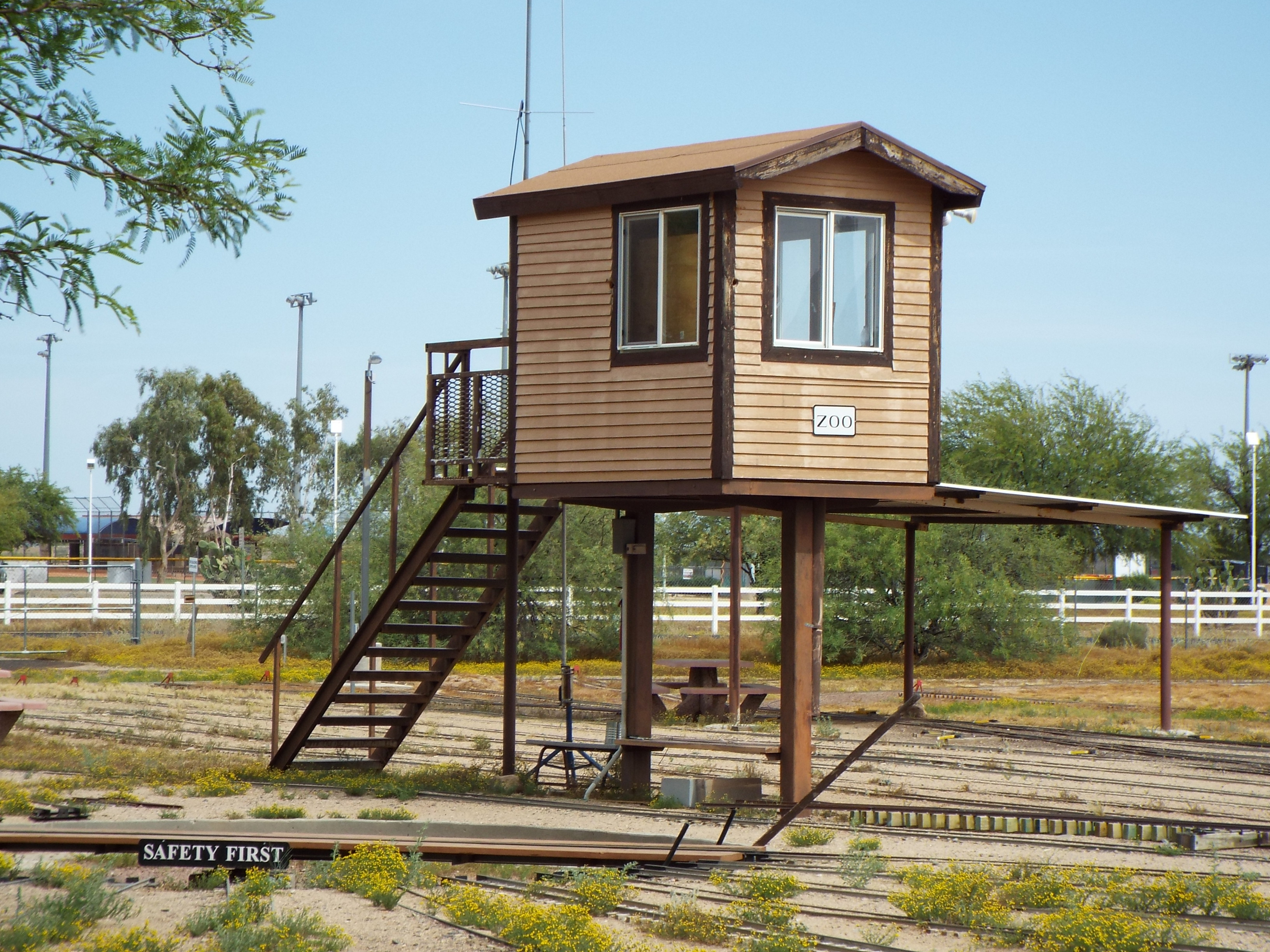
Former Adobe Mountain Park Ranger Tower as the main yard tower.

== See also ==
- McCormick-Stillman Railroad Park
- List of heritage railroads in the United States
- List of historic properties in Glendale, Arizona
- Catlin Court Historic District
- Manistee Ranch
- Sahuaro Ranch
- USS Arizona salvaged artifacts
