= Applicable margin reset =

Alternative to interest rate refinancing on collateralized loan obligation securities

Applicable margin reset (AMR) is a procedure developed to provide an alternative to refinance the interest rate on the outstanding rated classes of collateralized loan obligation (CLO) securities. AMR utilizes a modified Dutch auction procedure to set the new interest rate on each participating class of CLO securities.

== History ==
AMR was originally developed by Sancus Capital Management, an active investor in the CLO market not only as means to increase the efficiencies and reduce the costs of Traditional Refinancings, but also as a means for CLOs whose original issuance date predated the effective date of the U.S. risk retention rules to avoid being subject to the U.S. risk retention rules as a result of a Traditional Refinancing. In response to a request letter on behalf of Sancus Capital Management, the SEC confirmed in a Sept. 1, 2016, no-action letter that resetting the applicable margin of an AMR Class using AMR procedures would not constitute an “offer and sale of asset-backed securities by an issuing entity” and would therefore be unlikely to require compliance with the U.S. risk retention requirements.

The Atlas Senior Secured Loan Fund VIII, Ltd. CLO, managed by Crescent Capital Group L.P., was the first to incorporate the AMR mechanics in its CLO documents in July 2017. Since then, AMR has been incorporated in additional CLOs including transactions managed by Trimaran Advisors, LLC and Seix Investment Advisors LLC.

== AMR procedures ==
AMR affects the reset of the interest rate on each of the designated participating classes of CLO securities (each, an “AMR Class”) through a modified Dutch auction. Like Traditional Refinancings, the AMR procedures can be initiated at the direction of the holders of a majority of the Subordinated Notes of a CLO or by the Collateral Manager. In addition, the AMR procedures may also be initiated automatically, if certain specified objective conditions specified in the indenture for the related CLO have occurred.

Prior written notice of each AMR date, auction procedures, and other relevant information is distributed by the CLO trustee to the holders of each AMR Class and certain other transaction parties. An Auction Service Provider (the “ASP”) is appointed by the CLO issuer to facilitate the auction process. The ASP provides the platform for the submission of bids by participating member broker-dealers who are preapproved trading counterparties of the AMR settlement agent. These broker-dealers place confidential bids to purchase a specified principal balance of the AMR Classes at a spread (margin) to Libor not higher than a predetermined maximum margin. If sufficient bids are received by the ASP, the lowest margin at which such bids fully account for the aggregate principal balance of all securities (other than, if relevant, securities held by holders of risk retention interests), will become the “clearing rate” and the new applicable margin for the AMR Class. After the new applicable margin is established, the securities comprising each relevant AMR Class are mandatorily tendered pursuant to Depository Trust Company (DTC) protocols. If sufficient bids are not received to establish the clearing rate for any AMR Class, the auction for that specific AMR class fails and the applicable margin for the AMR class remains the same. A failed auction for one AMR Class does not impact the new clearing rate of any other AMR Class for which the auction was successful. On any subsequent AMR date, the auction may be repeated.

The period from the commencement of the AMR procedures by the delivery of an election notice by the majority of the Subordinated Notes or the Collateral Manager designating the relevant AMR Classes through the settlement date for purchases is approximately a 45-day period.

AMR can be utilized in addition to, and not in replacement of, Traditional Refinancings. The AMR provisions required to be incorporated into the standard CLO documentation are straightforward and limited. Such provisions have already been incorporated into the transaction documents for new issue CLOs and for previously issued CLOs in connection with the reset options.

== Transparency and risk retention compliance ==
The AMR auction results are made publicly available to promote transparency. In addition, access to AMR Classes being refinanced via the AMR auction process is intended to be democratic, providing access to investors who might otherwise be excluded from a Traditional Refinancing.

To the extent that an AMR Class contains risk retention securities under the European risk retention rules and/or the U.S. risk retention rules, such securities can be excluded from the AMR procedures, with the clearing rate being applied to such securities automatically.

== See also ==
- Collateralized debt obligation (CDO)
- Collateralized loan obligation (CLO)
- Refinancing
