= Ameri =

Ameri may refer to:

== People ==
- Ali Al-Ameri (born 1989), an Emirati footballer
- Goli Ameri (born 1956), an American diplomat and businesswoman
- Haddaf Al-Ameri (born 1992), known as Haddaf, an Emirati footballer
- Jaber Al-Ameri (born 1986), a Saudi Arabian footballer
- Juan Emilio Ameri (born 1973), Argentine politician
- Mirza Javad Khan Ameri (1891–1980), an Iranian politician
- Noor Al-Ameri (born 1994), an Iraqi female competitive shooter
- Zayed Al-Ameri (born 1997), an Emirati footballer

== Places ==
- Ameri, Deylam, Bushehr Province, Iran
- Ameri, Tangestan, Bushehr Province, Iran

== Other uses ==
- Āmeri House, a historic house in Kashan, Iran
- Ameri, a studio album by Argentine rapper Duki
  - Antes de Ameri

== See also ==
- Amer (disambiguation)
- Amari (disambiguation)
- American (disambiguation)
- Amri (disambiguation)
