= Amri Shirazi =

Amri Shirazi (Persian: امری شیرازی: died 1590 or 1591) was a poet and occultist in 16th-century Safavid Iran, who wrote his works in Persian, with only some of it surviving.

== Sources ==
- Losensky, Paul E. (2008). "Amrī Shīrāzī". In Fleet, Kate; Krämer, Gudrun; Matringe, Denis; Nawas, John; Rowson, Everett (eds.). Encyclopaedia of Islam (3rd ed.). Brill Online. doi:10.1163/1573-3912_ei3_COM_26342. ISSN 1873-9830.
