= Amr Sobhy =

Amr Sobhy عمرو صبحي
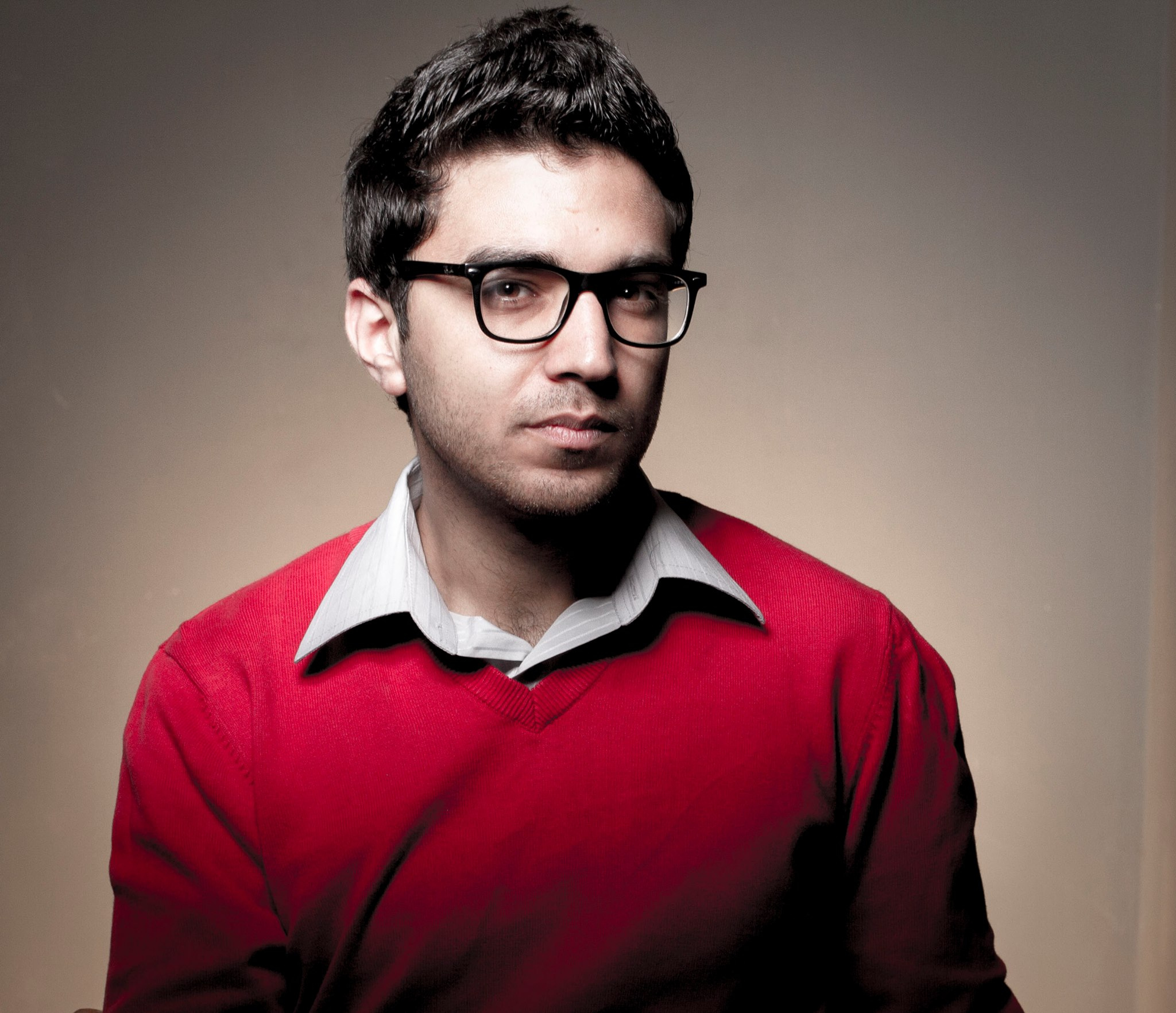
- Born: July 4, 1988 (age 38)
- Education: University of Tanta (BS); Birkbeck, University of London (MSc)

Amr Sobhy (Arabic: عمرو صبحي) is an Egyptian information activist, social and tech entrepreneur, published author and poet. He is best known as co-creator of MorsiMeter; a digital initiative and online platform to document and monitor the performance of Egyptian President, Mohamed Morsi, which has attracted a wide global attention. The initiative modeled after Obameter is considered to be the first in Egypt and the Middle East to hold a president accountable for his promises. His work gave rise to other political promise trackers including Iran's Rouhani Meter and Canada's TrudeauMeter.

== Awards ==
- 100 Most Influential Young Africans 2017.
- Forbes 30 Most Promising Young Entrepreneurs In Africa 2017
- Nominated for Data Journalism Award 2016 by Global Editors Network for Open Data category.
- World Summit Awards 2012
- Mastercard Foundation Anzisha Fellowship 2011
- World Summit Awards 2011
- Egypt's Award for Child Literature (Internet Applications, 2004)

== Literary works ==
- Zatul Redaa' al-Kormozeyy (The Lady in Scarlet - ذات الرداء القرمزي, 2012, Poetry)
- Yawmyat Kahl Sagheer al-Sen (Diary of a Timeworn Lad - يوميات كهل صغير السن, 2011, Prose)
- Addahshatul Ola (The First Marvel - الدهشة الأولى, 2008, Poetry)
