= Amplified magnetic resonance imaging =

Amplified magnetic resonance imaging (aMRI) is an MRI method that is coupled with video magnification processing methods to amplify the subtle spatial variations in MRI scans and to enable better visualization of tissue motion. aMRI can enable better visualization of tissue motion to aid the in vivo assessment of the biomechanical response in pathology. It is thought to have potential for helping with diagnosing and monitoring a range of clinical implications in the brain and other organs, including in Chiari Malformation, brain injury, hydrocephalus, other conditions associated with abnormal intracranial pressure, cerebrovascular, and neurodegenerative disease.

The aMRI method takes high temporal-resolution MRI data as input, applies a spatial decomposition, followed by temporal filtering and frequency-selective amplification of the MRI frames before synthesizing a motion-amplified MRI data set. This approach can reveal deformations of the brain parenchyma and displacements of arteries due to cardiac pulsatility and CSF flow. aMRI has thus far been demonstrated to amplify motion in brain tissue to a more visible scale, however, can in theory be applied to visualize motion induced by other endogenous or exogenous sources in other tissues.

aMRI uses video magnificent processing methods, which use Eulerian Video Magnification and phase-based motion processing, with the latter thought to be less prone to noise and less sensitive to nonmotion-induced, voxel-intensity changes. Both video-processing methods use a series of mathematical operations used in image processing known as steerable-pyramid wavelet transformation to amplify motion without the accompanying noise. The aMRI temporal data undergoes spatial decomposition, followed by temporal filtering and frequency-selective amplification – and can allow one to visualize in vivo tissue and vascular motion that is smaller than the image resolution.
