= Amer =

Amer may refer to:

== Places ==
- Amer (river), a river in the Dutch province of North Brabant
- Amer, Girona, a municipality in the province of Girona in Catalonia, Spain
- Amber, India (also known as Amer, India), former city of Rajasthan state
  - Amber Fort (also Amer Fort), India
- AMER, a country grouping that refers to America or the Americas

== People ==
- Amer (name)
- Beni-Amer people, a mixed ethnic group inhabiting Sudan and Eritrea

== Other uses ==
- Amer International Group, a Chinese company
- Amer Sports, a Finnish headquartered sporting goods company
- Amer (film), a 2009 Belgian-French thriller

== See also ==
- Ameri (disambiguation)
- Umerkot, a town in Sindh province of Pakistan
