= Omri Marcus =

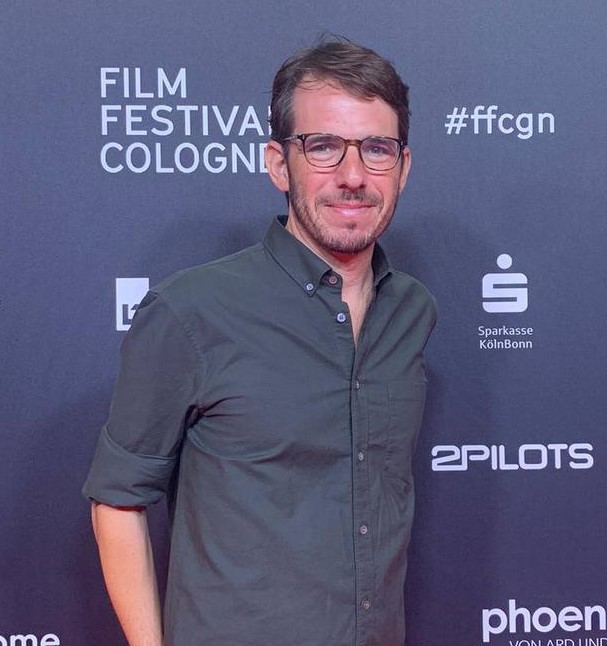
- Marcus in 2019
- Born: July 7, 1979 (age 46)
- Occupations: Content strategist and screenwriter

Omri Marcus (born July 7, 1979) is an Israeli television writer and content strategist. His work involves television format development and the application of artificial intelligence (AI) in media production.

== Television career ==
Marcus started his career writing for Israeli television programs, including the satirical show Eretz Nehederet.

He developed the dating show format Buzz Off, which was optioned internationally."Red Arrow aims for Israeli creative". C21 Media. April 8, 2010. Later, he worked as head of development at Channel 2 (Reshet) and joined Red Arrow Entertainment Group as a development partner.

== Technology and media projects ==
Marcus teaches a course on AI for screenwriters at the Sam Spiegel Film and Television School."First AI screenwriting course at Sam Spiegel School". The Jerusalem Post. December 30, 2025.Sam Spiegel Film Lab, "Session no. 2 of the Series Lab's 3rd Edition Concludes", August 1, 2024.

In 2023, he directed a civilian public diplomacy initiative at the Gitam-BBDO advertising agency, producing AI-generated videos regarding the Israeli hostages."Israeli comedy post-October 7: Humor amid war". The Jerusalem Post. November 11, 2024.

In 2014, he founded "Comedy for Change," a network for comedy writers. In 2024, this group launched "The Comedy Brigade," aiming to counter online antisemitism."Fighting Antisemitism with Punchlines". Jewish Online Review. May 31, 2024. He also started "The Finger Awards," an initiative recognizing comedy projects linked to social change.

Marcus co-founded a joint Israeli-Palestinian tech venture and volunteers as communications director for Eye from Zion, a medical NGO."Omri Marcus – SXSW 2019 Speaker Profile". SXSW. 2019.
