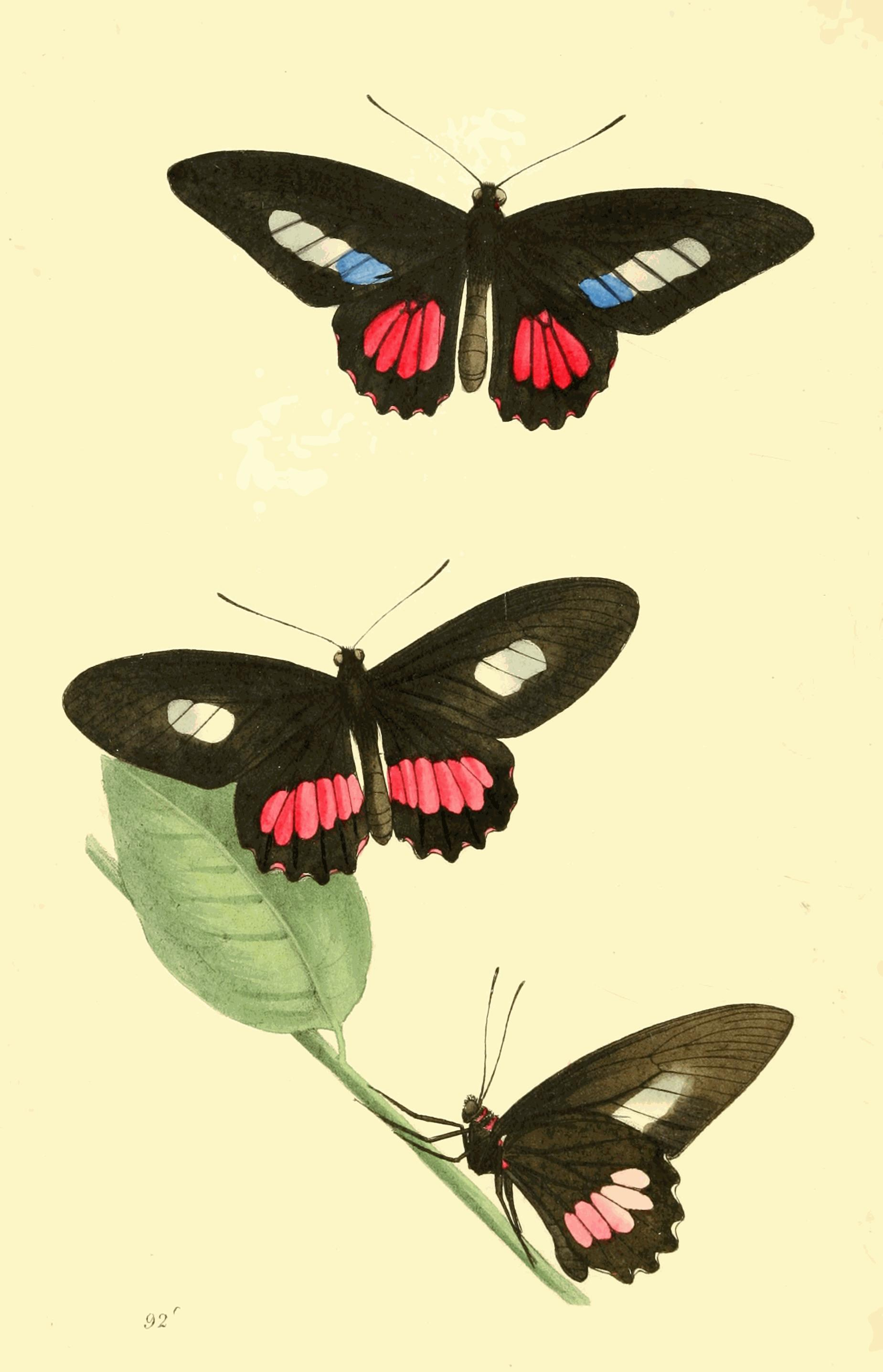

Scientific classification
- Kingdom: Animalia
- Phylum: Arthropoda
- Class: Insecta
- Order: Lepidoptera
- Family: Papilionidae
- Genus: Parides
- Species: P. zacynthus

Binomial name
- Parides zacynthus (Fabricius, 1793)

Synonyms
- Papilio zacynthus Fabricius, 1793; Papilio dimas Fabricius, 1793; Papilio polymetus Godart, 1819; Papilio orsillus Gray, [1853]

= Parides zacynthus =

Species of butterfly

Parides zacynthus is a species of butterfly in the family Papilionidae. It is found in the Neotropical realm where it is endemic to Eastern Brazil.

The larvae feed on Aristolochia species (including Aristolochia macroura, Aristolochia odora and Aristolochia ruminifolia).

== Subspecies ==
- Parides zacynthus zacynthus (Brazil: Rio de Janeiro, Espirito Santo, Santa Catarina, São Paulo, Paraná)
- Parides zacynthus polymetus (Godart, 1819) (Brazil: Pernambuco to Bahia)

== Description from Seitz ==
P. zacynthus. Band on the forewing in the male greenish blue. The spots on the under surface of the hindwing of the female paler than in P. neophilus. Brazil, from Rio de Janeiro northwards, in two geographical forms. Not rare in damp localities overgrown with bushes. The larva is grey-brown, with a yellow lateral stripe. — The form from the province of Rio de Janeiro, zacynthus F. (5b), occurs in the neighbourhood of the town of Rio, but is much rarer than P. nephalion. The forewing is not transparent at the apex; the female has a spot in the cell of the forewing. — The northern form, from Pernambuco, Bahia and Rio Tapajos, is polymetus Godt. (5 b). The forewing is transparent at the apex and the female has no spot in the cell, or only a very small one.

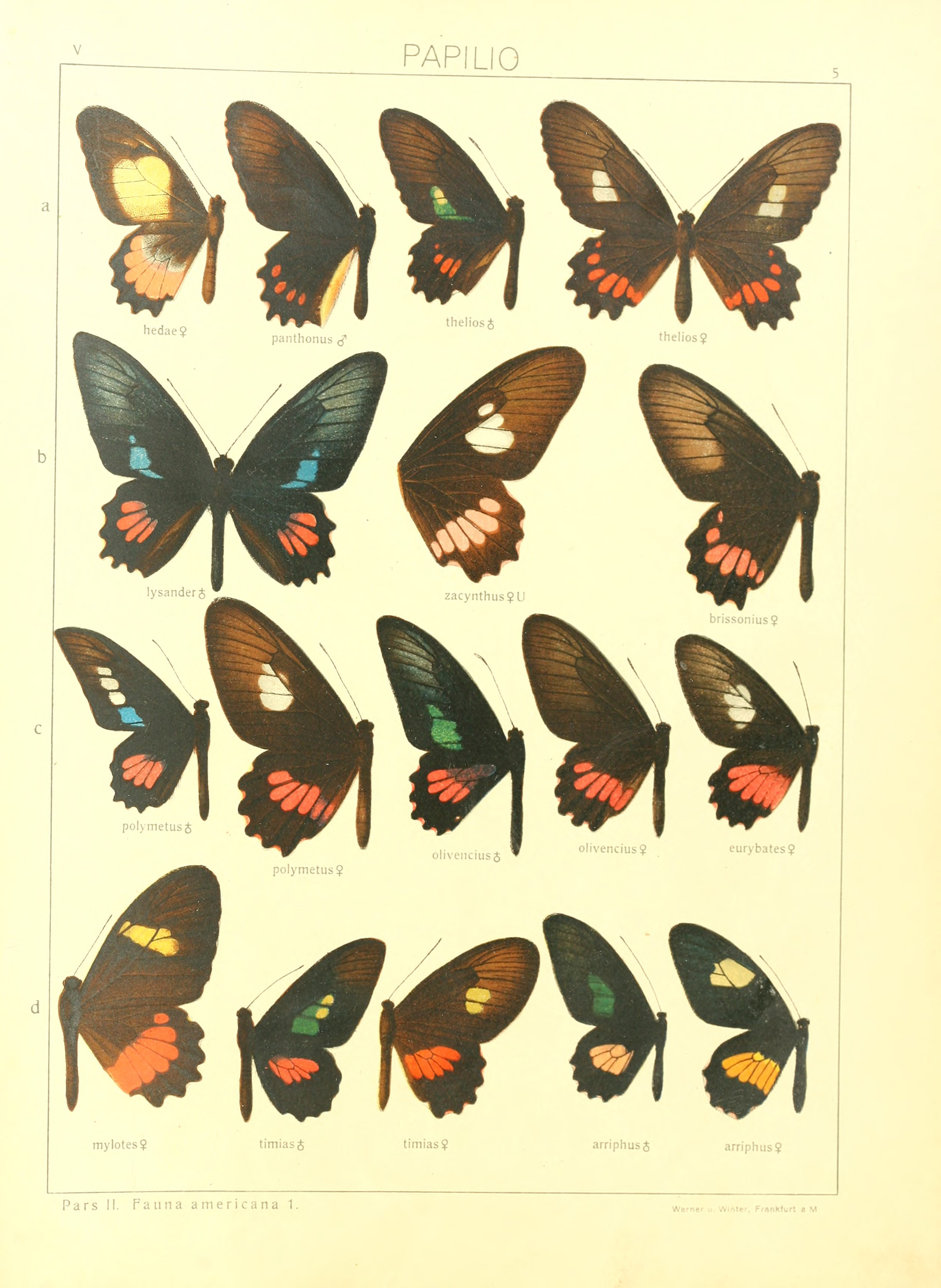
Seitz

== Description from Rothschild and Jordan(1906) ==
A full description is provided by Rothschild, W. and Jordan, K. (1906)

== Taxonomy ==
Parides zacynthus is a member of the aeneas species group.

The members are

- Parides aeneas
- Parides aglaope
- Parides burchellanus
- Parides echemon
- Parides eurimedes
- Parides lysander
- Parides neophilus
- Parides orellana
- Parides panthonus
- Parides tros
- Parides zacynthus
