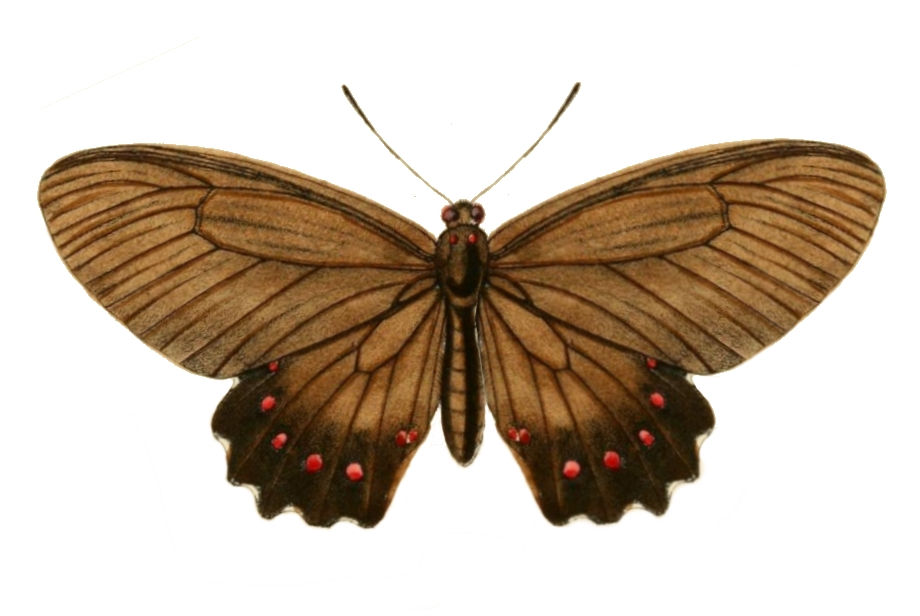

Conservation status
- Endangered (IUCN 3.1)
- CITES Appendix I

Scientific classification
- Kingdom: Animalia
- Phylum: Arthropoda
- Clade: Pancrustacea
- Class: Insecta
- Order: Lepidoptera
- Family: Papilionidae
- Genus: Parides
- Species: P. burchellanus

Binomial name
- Parides burchellanus (Westwood, 1872)

Synonyms
- Parides panthonus jaguarae (Foetterle, 1902: male)

= Parides burchellanus =

Species of butterfly

Parides burchellanus is a species of swallowtail butterfly (family Papilionidae). It is endemic to Brazil. It is one of only two butterflies on the IUCN's 100 Most Endangered Species in the World, the other being Actinote zikani.

== Description ==
Parides burchellanus is a large, velvet-black butterfly. The forewing is unmarked except for small, white marginal spots. The underside of the hindwing has small, red postdiscal spots. These are smaller and paler on the lower surface. The hindwing has a scalloped outer margin and a large androconial hair-pouch on the anal margin of the male. There are no tails. Apart from the hair-pouch, the sexes are alike. A full description is provided by Rothschild, W. and Jordan, K. (1906).

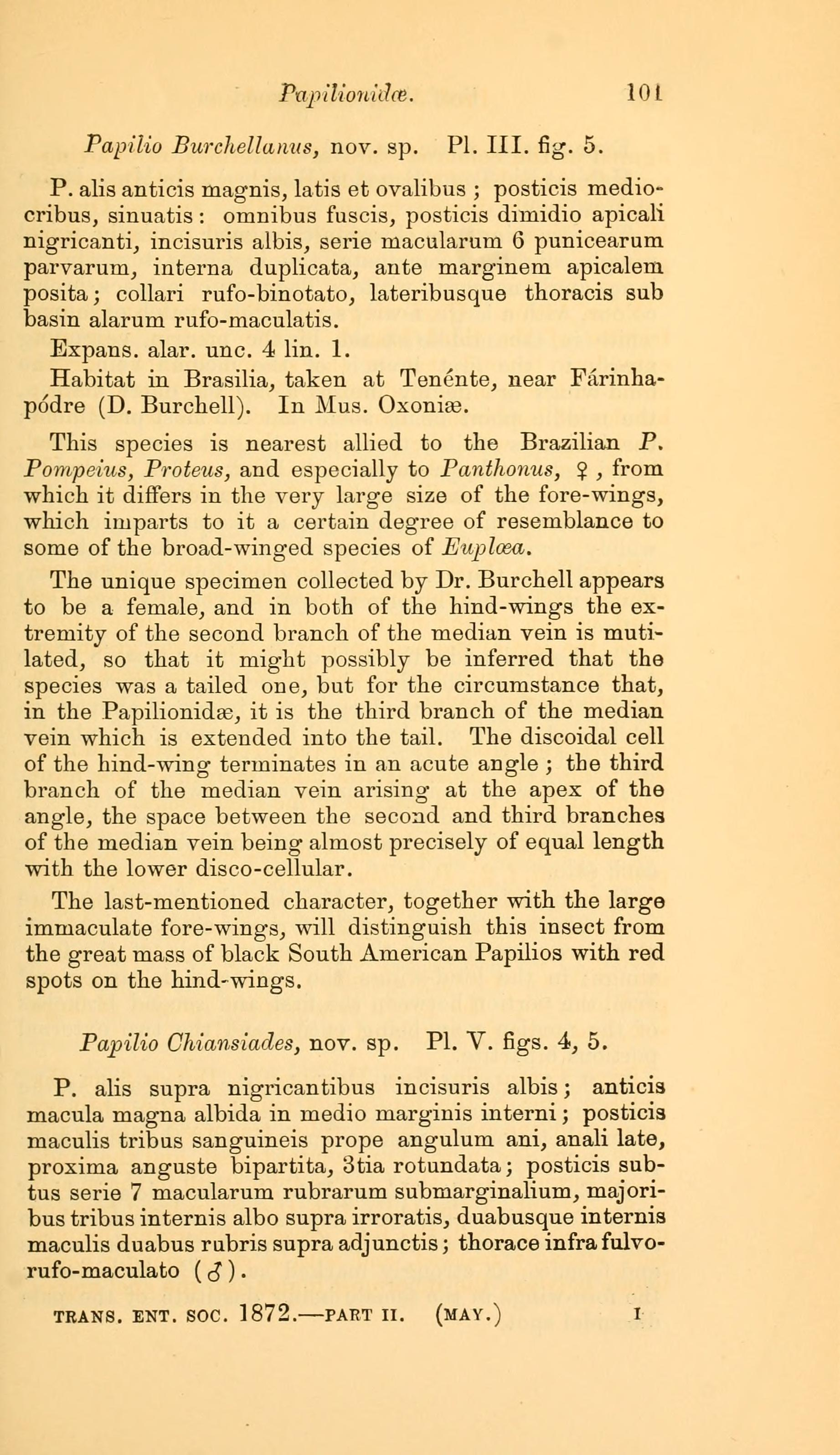
Original description

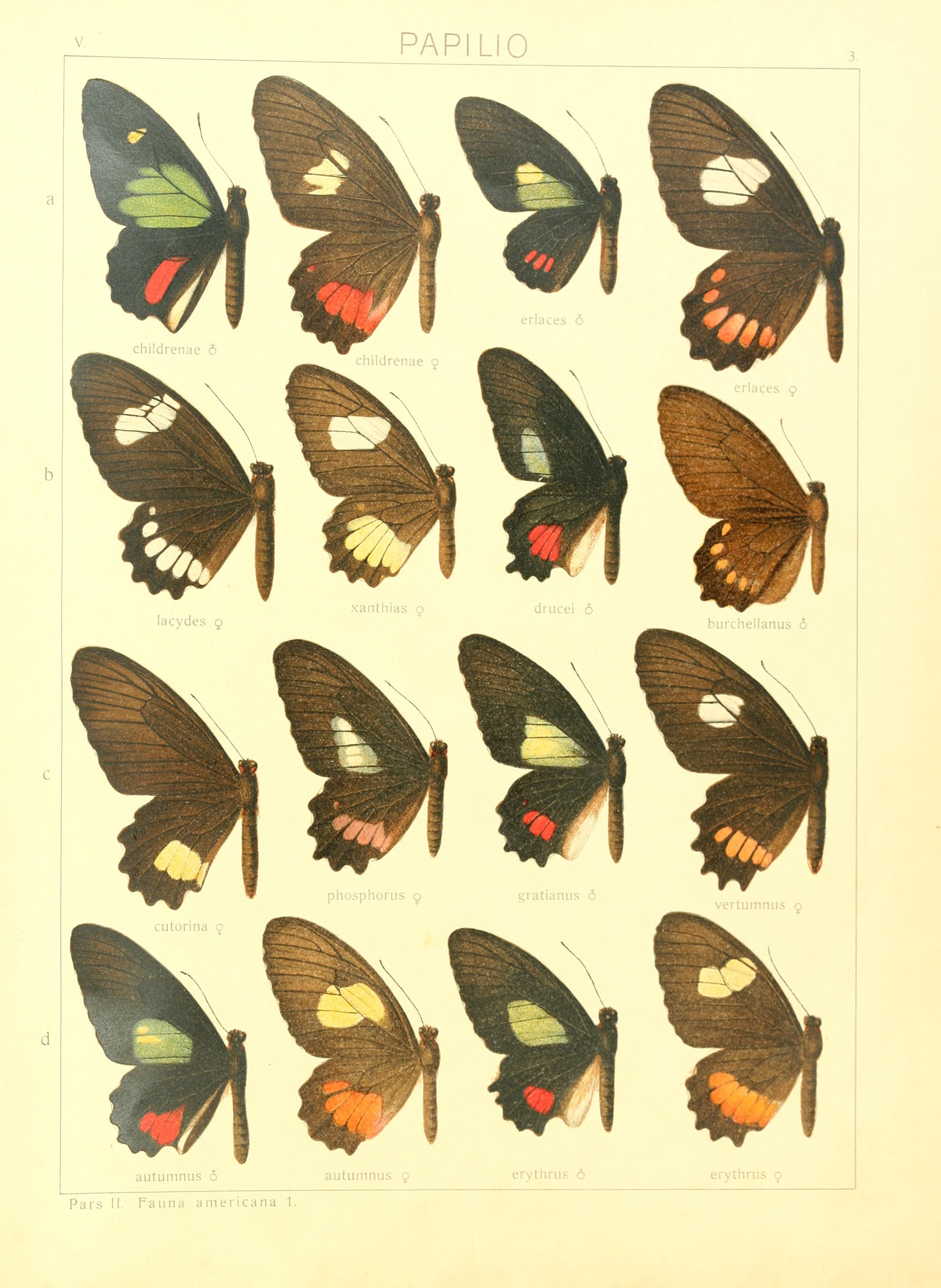
in Seitz

== Biology ==
The food plants of the larvae are Aristolochia chamissonia and A. melastoma.

== Taxonomy ==
Parides burchellanus is a member of the Parides aeneas species group and may be conspecific with Parides aeneas. A suggested intermediate is known.

The aeneas group members are

- Parides aeneas
- Parides aglaope
- Parides burchellanus
- Parides echemon
- Parides eurimedes
- Parides lysander
- Parides neophilus
- Parides orellana
- Parides panthonus
- Parides tros
- Parides zacynthus

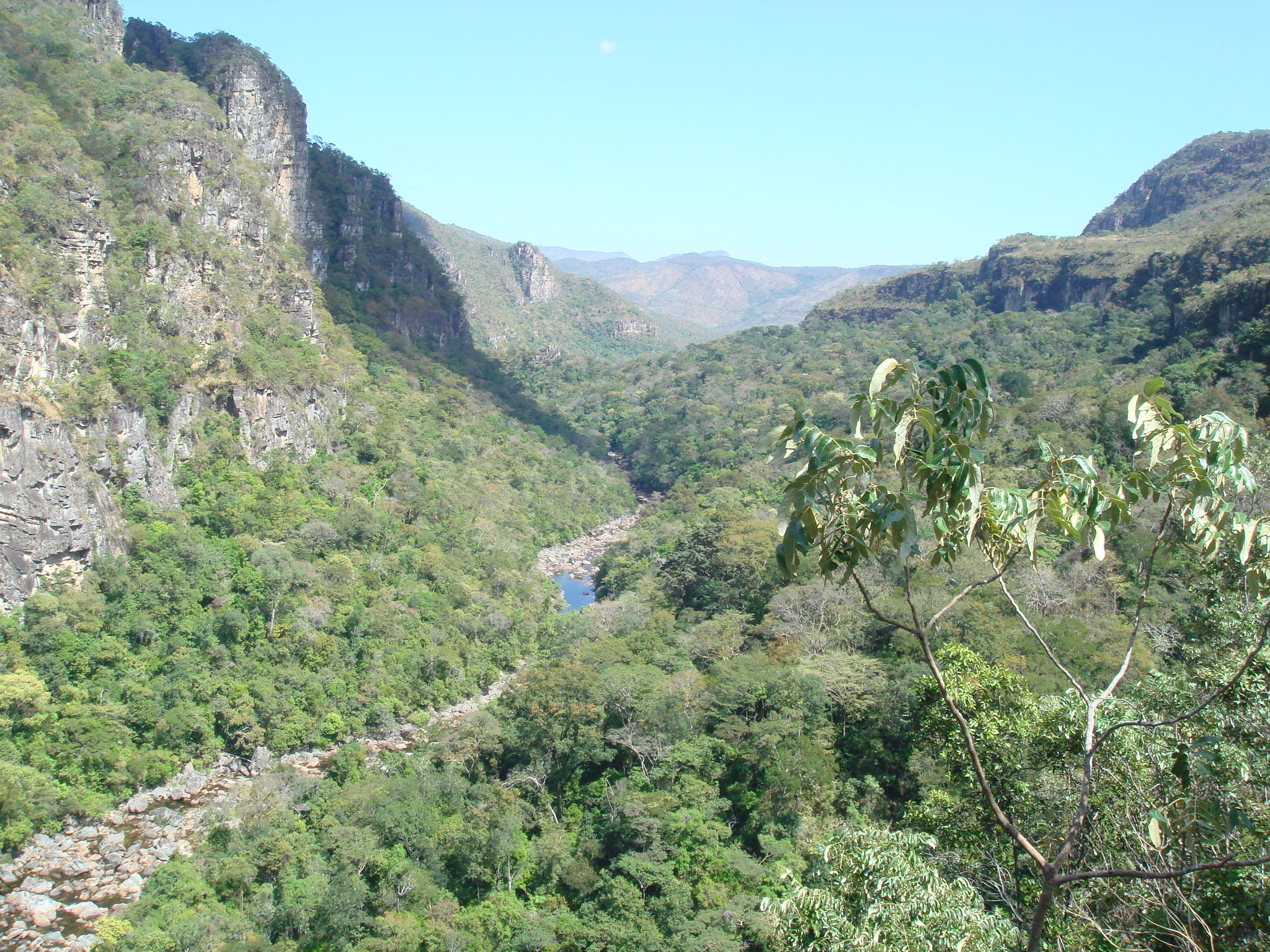
River vegetation in the Cerrado

== Habitat and threats ==
P. burchellanus is a rare species or, if it is a subspecies, an evolutionarily significant unit, of butterfly (Lepidoptera, Papilionoidea) that lives in a very few areas in central Brazil. Its close relation with a highly peculiar environment (gallery or riparian forest along rivers running through the cerrado landscape) restricts its occurrence to a few points. The frailty of its habitat, towards the increasing of loss of natural environments, makes it a target prone to elimination.

P. burchellanus is associated with riparian forests in Brazil, in which these rare butterflies tend to inhabit narrow streams among sectors in which the river is cut off by the forest canopy.

== Etymology ==
The name honours William John Burchell.
