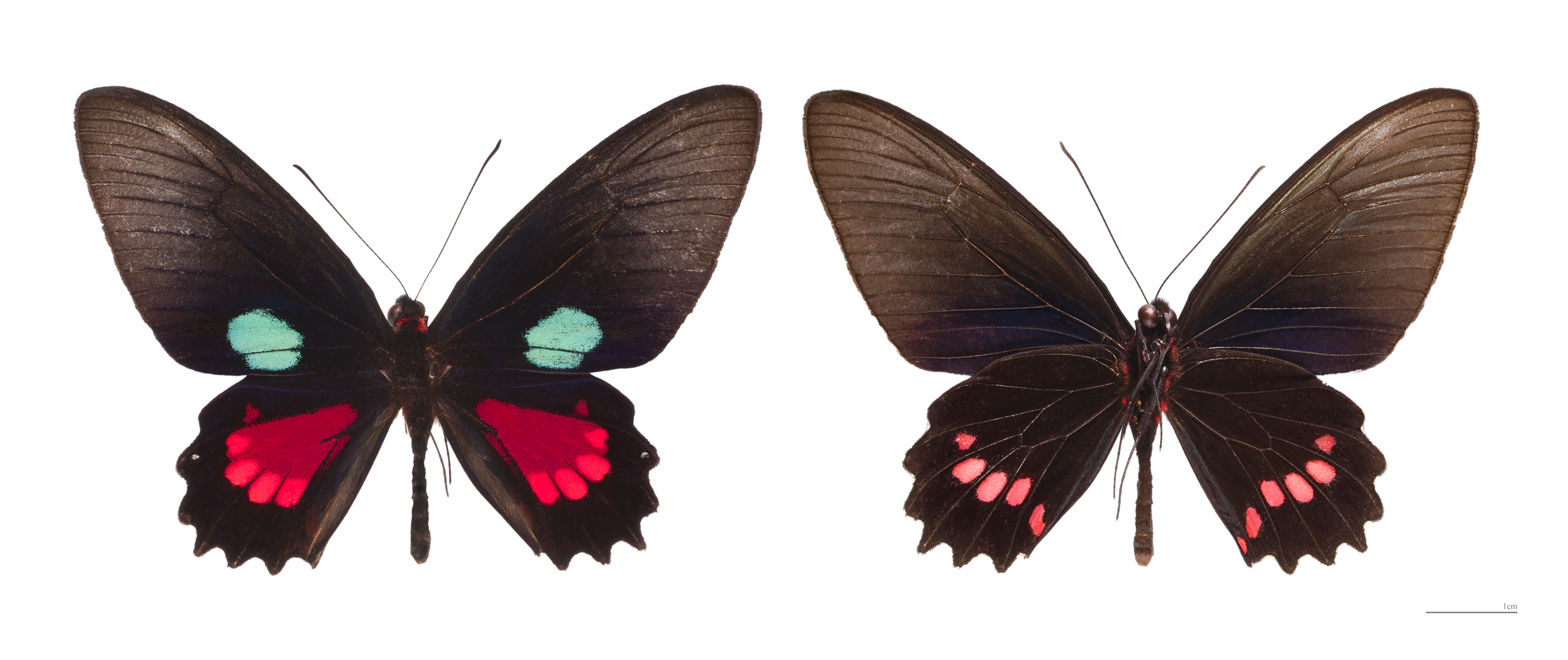
- Female, upperside (left) and underside (right)

Conservation status
- Least Concern (IUCN 3.1)

Scientific classification
- Kingdom: Animalia
- Phylum: Arthropoda
- Clade: Pancrustacea
- Class: Insecta
- Order: Lepidoptera
- Family: Papilionidae
- Genus: Parides
- Species: P. aeneas

Binomial name
- Parides aeneas (Linnaeus, 1758)

Synonyms
- Papilio aeneas Linnaeus, 1758; Papilio aeneides Esper, 1788; Parides gargasus Hübner, [1819]; Papilio aeneas aeneas ♀-f. specularis Rothschild & Jordan, 1906; Papilio bolivar Hewitson, 1850; Papilio aeneas foucheri Le Moult, 1926; Papilio aeneas foucheri ab. decellei Le Moult, 1926; Papilio aeneas foucheri ab. flavosquamosus Le Moult, 1926; Papilio aeneas ab. rubrofimbriatus Le Moult, 1926; Papilio aeneas f. bolivar ab. imperfecta Krüger, 1933; Papilio opalinus Butler, 1877; Papilio aeneas damis Rothschild & Jordan, 1906; Papilio aeneas damis ♀-f. pyromelas Rothschild & Jordan, 1906; Papilio aeneas locris Rothschild & Jordan, 1906; Papilio aeneas gabrielensis Bryk, 1953; Papilio aeneas damis ♀-f. eucharia Rothschild & Jordan, 1906; Papilio aeneas linus Rothschild & Jordan, 1906; Papilio bochus Lucas, 1852 (preocc. Stoll, 1782); Papilio aeneas aeneas ♀-f. dido Rothschild & Jordan, 1906

= Parides aeneas =

Species of butterfly

Parides aeneas is a species of butterfly in the family Papilionidae. It is found in the Neotropical realm.

The larva feeds on Aristolochia burchelli and A. barbata

== Subspecies ==
- P. a. aeneas Guianas, Surinam
- P. a. bolivar (Hewitson, 1850) Ecuador, NE.Peru, Colombia, Brazil (Amazonas)
- P. a. opalinus Butler, 1877 Brazil (Amazonas)
- P. a. damis (Rothschild & Jordan, 1906) Peru
- P. a. locris (Rothschild & Jordan, 1906) Bolivia
- P. a. gabrielensis (Bryk, 1953) Brazil (Amazonas)
- P. a. marcius (Hübner, [1816]) Brazil (Pará)
- P. a. huallaga Racheli, 1988 Peru
- P. a. lamasi Racheli, 1988 Peru
- P. a. tucha Racheli, 1988 Peru
- P. a. linoides Brown & Lamas, 1994 Brazil (Pará)
- P. a. lucasi Brown & Lamas, 1994 French Guiana
- P. a. didas Brown & Lamas, 1994 Guiana, Surinam, French Guiana

== Description from Seitz ==
P. aeneas. Palpi black, as in the preceding species. Abdomen in the female with a small red spot beneath before the tip. Sexes very different. Male with green spot on the forewing; hindwing with red nonopalescent central area, not extending further towards the base than to the middle of the cell. In the female the forewing is either entirely black, or bears one or more white obsolete spots on the margins. Guiana; Upper Orinoco; Amazon from Para upwards; eastern slopes of the Andes of Peru and Bolivia. Several geographical forms. A woodland species, about whose earlier stages nothing is known. — aeneas L. (= gargasus Hbn.; aeneides Esp).; bochus Luc.) (2 b) inhabits the three Guianas. The green spot of the male is removed from the cell, and is usually wider before than behind the submedian vein. The female occurs in two forms: female-f. specularis R. & J. has on the forewing a large white spot before the 1. median, and usually several smaller ones, of which one is in the cell. In the second form, female -f. dido R. & J., the forewing has no white spots. — marcius Hbn. (2 b) is the subspecies from the Lower Amazon. The male is similar to that of aeneas, but the last red spot but one on the under surface is larger. We know only one form of the female; in this the white spot of the forewing — linus R. & J. from the Middle Amazon (Santarem, Obidos, Massauary) was unknown to Bates. The red spots on the underside of the hindwing of the male are paler than in the last subspecies, and stand closer together and nearer to the cell. In the female the red spots are united into an uninterrupted band. — damis R. & J. inhabits East Peru. The green spot of the male is larger than in the preceding forms, and the spots on the under surface of the hindwing are reddish white. The female occurs in two forms: female-f pyromelas R. & J. (2b) has entirely black forewing; the red spots of the hindwing are confluent, forming a band. In female -f. eucharia R. & J. the forewing has a large white area with undefined margins. — locris R. & J. is in the male similar to the last subspecies, but the red spots on the hindwing are larger. The female has always a white area on the fore-wing; the red spots on the hindwing are separated from one another, the spot before the 1. median being the largest. Bolivia. — bolivar Hew. (2 a) inhabits the Upper Amazon and the Orinoco. The red area on the hindwing of the male is small, and is whitish yellow on the under surface. Forewing of the female black, with white spots on the fringes; hindwing with a whitish yellow area.

Seitz Plate 2

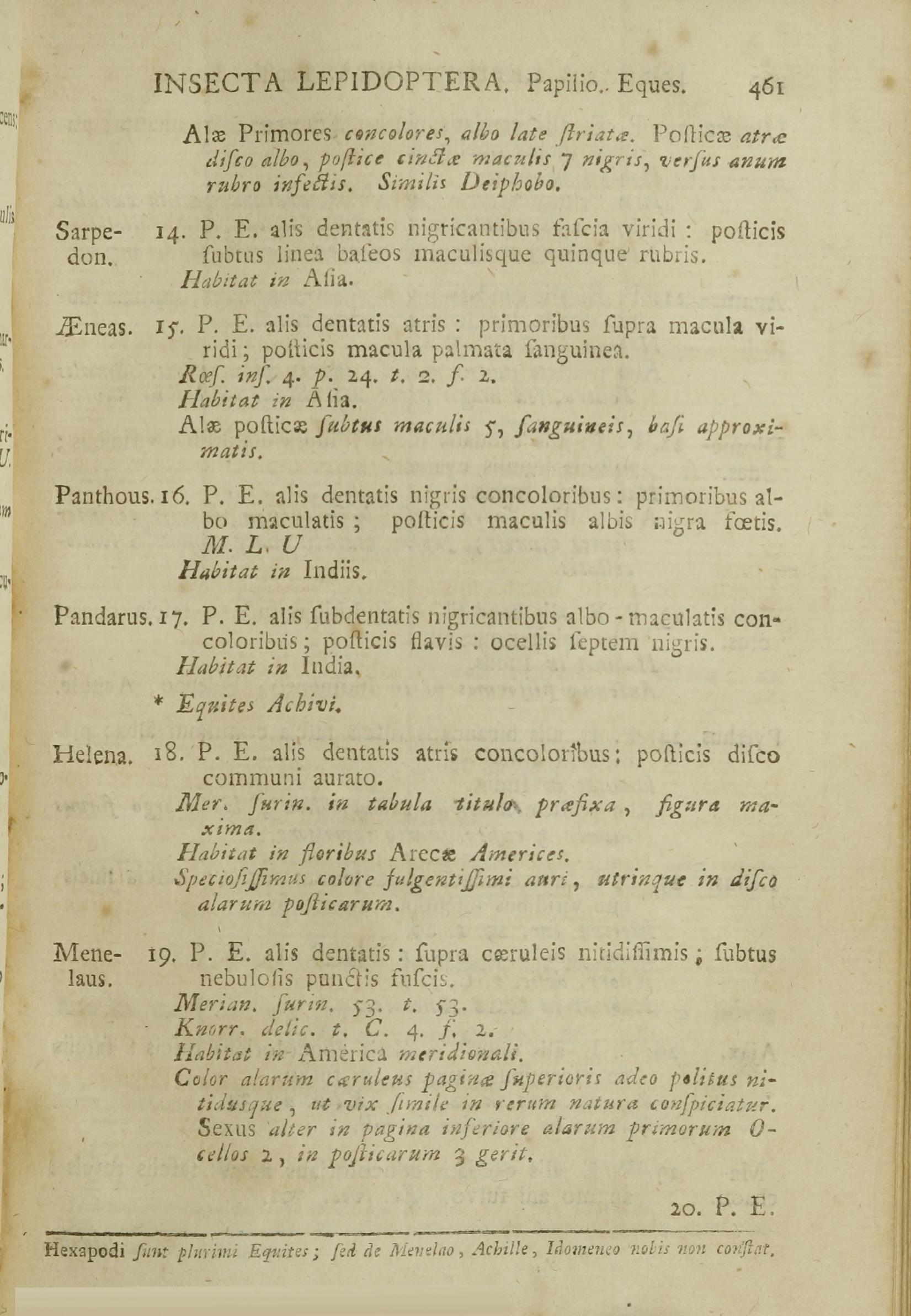
Original description

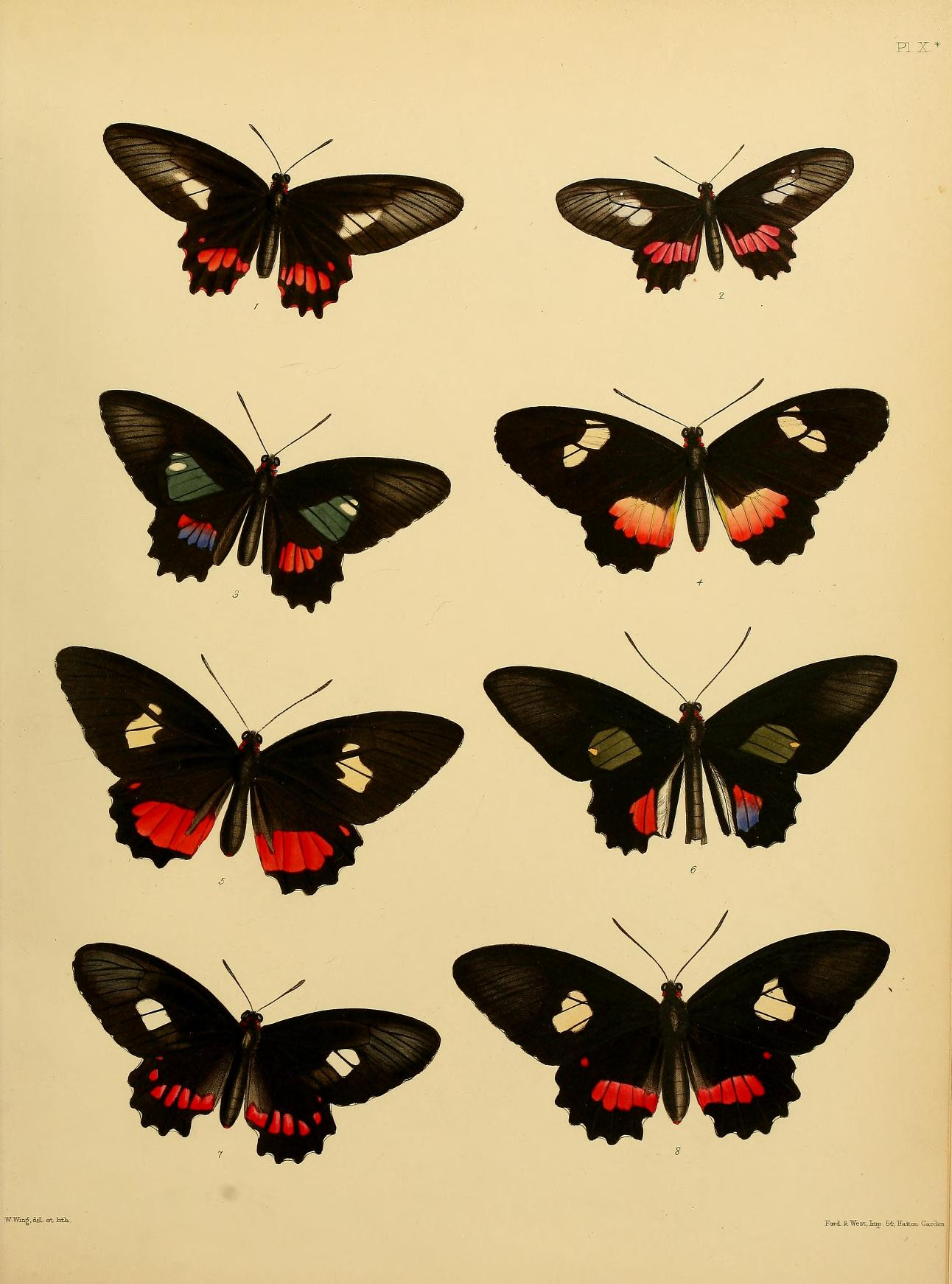
Gray Catalogue 1853

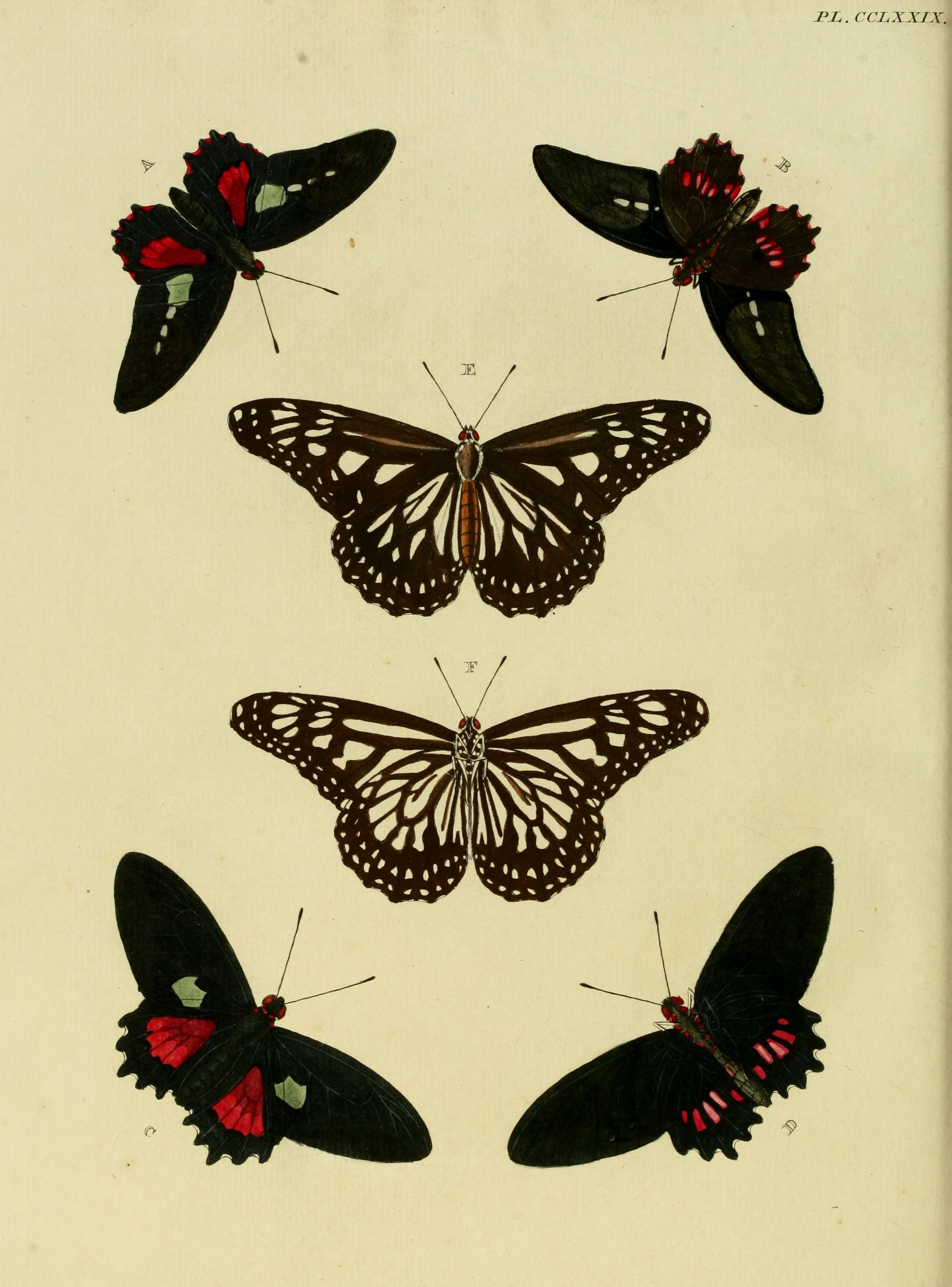
Uitlandsche Kapellen

== Status ==
Parides aeneas is common and not known to be threatened.

== Taxonomy ==
Parides aeneas is a member of the aeneas species group

The members are

- Parides aeneas
- Parides aglaope
- Parides burchellanus
- Parides echemon
- Parides eurimedes
- Parides lysander
- Parides neophilus
- Parides orellana
- Parides panthonus
- Parides tros
- Parides zacynthus
