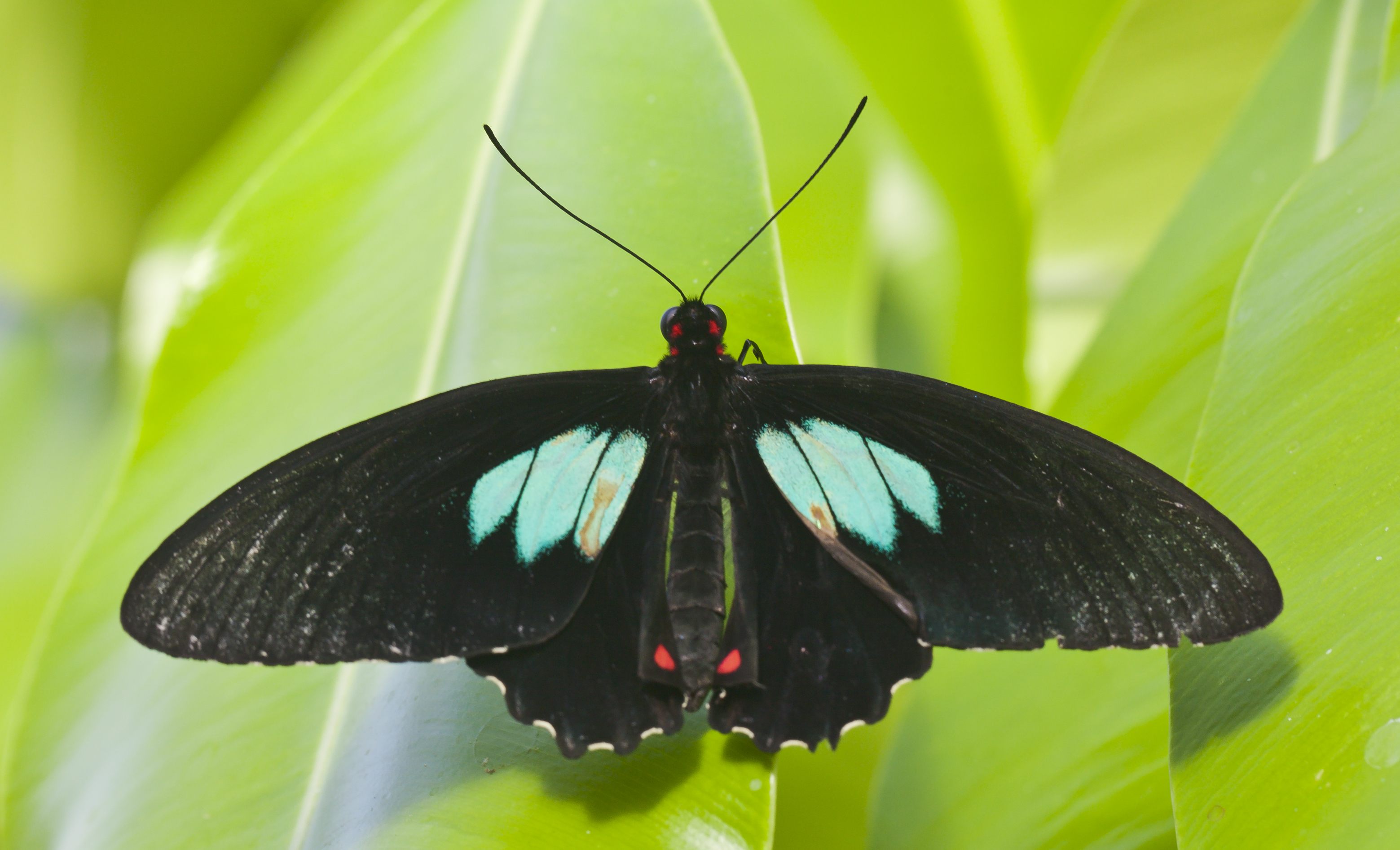
- Male
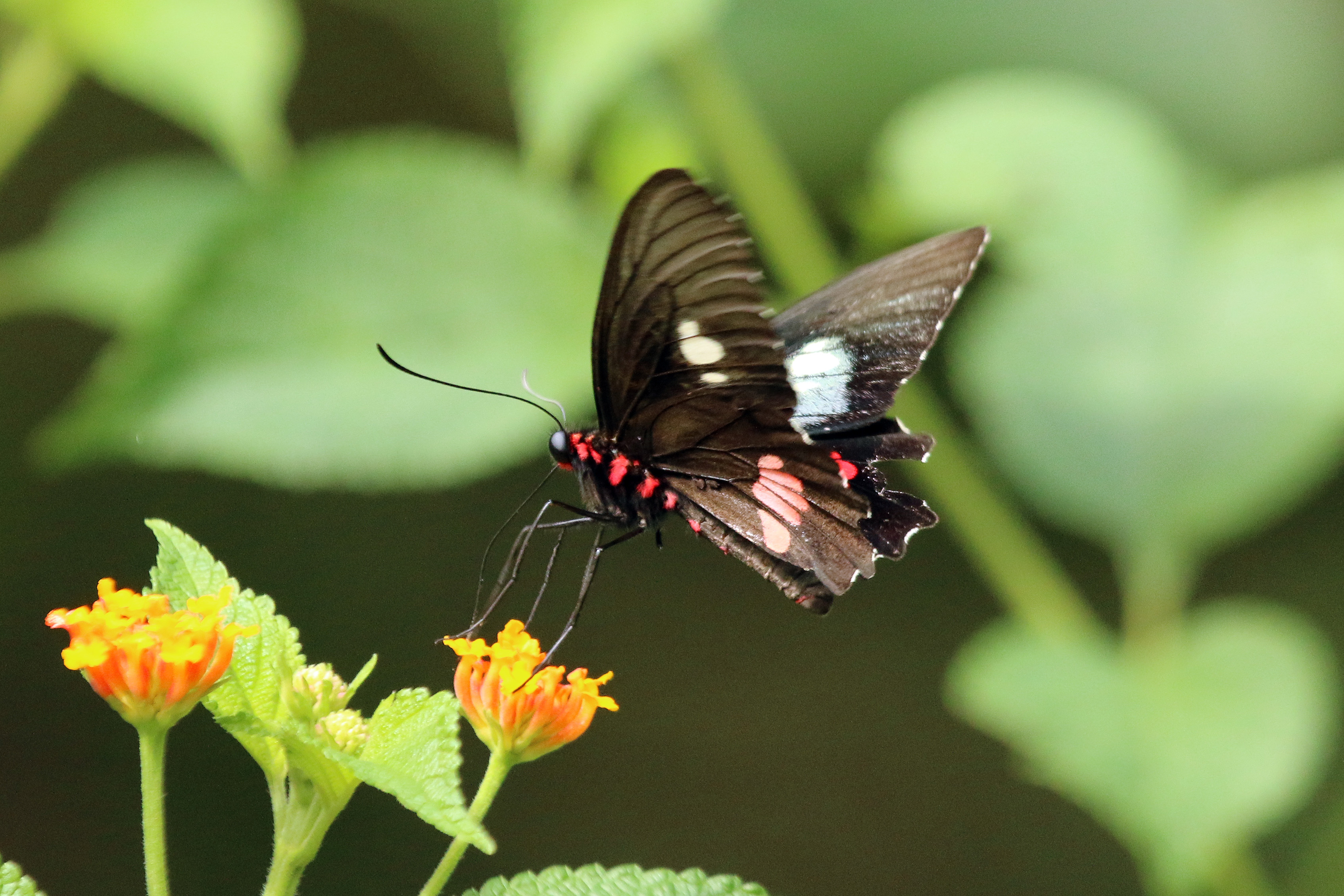
- Female P. n. parianus, Trinidad

Scientific classification
- Kingdom: Animalia
- Phylum: Arthropoda
- Class: Insecta
- Order: Lepidoptera
- Family: Papilionidae
- Genus: Parides
- Species: P. neophilus

Binomial name
- Parides neophilus (Geyer, 1837)

Synonyms
- Priamides neophilus Geyer, 1837; Papilio anaximenes C. & R. Felder, 1862; Papilio neophilus consus Rothschild & Jordan, 1906; Papilio neophilus ecbolius Rothschild & Jordan, 1906; Papilio eurybates Gray, [1853]; Papilio eupales Gray, [1853]; Papilio eurybates f. autumnalis Köhler, 1923; Papilio neophilus parianus Rothschild & Jordan, 1906; Papilio olivencius Bates, 1861; Papilio schuppi Röber, 1927; Battus (Parides) neophilus napoensis Varea, 1975

= Parides neophilus =

Species of butterfly

Parides neophilus, the spear-winged cattleheart, is a species of butterfly in the family Papilionidae. It is found in the Neotropical realm.

The larvae feed on Aristolochia trilobata and Aristolochia colombiana.

== Subspecies ==
- P. n. neophilus – Guianas, Surinam, southern Venezuela
- P. n. anaximenes (C. & R. Felder, 1862) – Peru
- P. n. consus (Rothschild & Jordan, 1906) – Bolivia
- P. n. ecbolius (Rothschild & Jordan, 1906) – Brazil (Pará, Amazonas)
- P. n. eurybates (Gray, [1853]) – Brazil (Mato Grosso, western São Paulo, Rio Grande do Sul), Paraguay, Argentina (Misiones)
- P. n. parianus (Rothschild & Jordan, 1906) – Trinidad, Venezuela
- P. n. olivencius (Bates, 1861) – Colombia, Peru, Brazil (Amazonas)
- P. n. napoensis Varea, 1975 – eastern Ecuador

== Description from Seitz ==
P. neophilus. In the male the cell of the hindwing on the upper surface is red nearly to the base. In both sexes the 2. median of the hindwing arises at the same height as the subcostal. Colombia to Paraguay and South Brazil, but not from Rio de Janeiro to Pernambuco, where P. zacynthus occurs. — eurybates Gray (= euphales Gray) (5c), male with large white spots on the forewing; the red spots on the hindwing not blackish towards the base, with the exception of the first and last, the middle ones touching the cell on the under surface. Female with 2 white spots between the 3. radial and 2. median, rarely with the spots merely indicated, the red band on the hindwing broad. Sao Paulo and Matto Grosso; Paraguay (transition to the next form). — consus R.& J. male : the green area between the 2. median longer than broad, the white spot before the 2. median rounded, usually smaller than the preceding spot; on the hindwing the cell-spot and the part of the discal spot next to the cell are blackish red; the spots on the underside smaller than in eurybates. In the female the white spots are large; the band on the hindwing is usually -separate from the cell. East Bolivia. — olivencius Bates (5 c). White spots on the forewing in both sexes small or indistinct; the red spots on the hindwing in the male long on the upper surface, short on the under. In the female-ab. anaximenes Fldr. the spots of the hindwing are very long. East Peru to the Cordillera of Bogota, and on the Amazon downwards to the Rio Negro. - ecbolius R.& J.: the green spot behind the 2. median of the forewing about as long as broad, the white spot before this vein distinct and transverse as the preceding spot; the red spots on the hindwing shorter than in olivencius. In the female the forewing has a large white spot before the 2. median and another before the 1. median, the outer margin of these spots almost parallel with the outer margin of the wing. Lower Amazon, upwards to Obidos. — neophilus Hbn. (= gargasus Hbn. [partim], aeneides Esp. [partim]), the first described form, inhabits the Guianas. Male : the green area is broader and the red spots on the underside of the hindwing smaller than in the male of ecbolius. In the female there are no white spots on the forewing, or they are small, rarely are they large; the third spot on the hindwing longer than the others, the spots on the upper surfacefurther from the margin than in olivencius. — parianus R.& J. from Trinidad, Gumana and the Orinoco. The green area of the male behind the 2. median longer than it is broad, enclosing three white spots; the spots on the under surface of the hindwing paler than in the Bolivian form, to which parianus comes near, the spot before the 2. median placed close to the cell. In the female the band of the hindwing is somewhat more curved than in the other subspecies; the narrow middle spots are placed close to the cell on both surfaces.

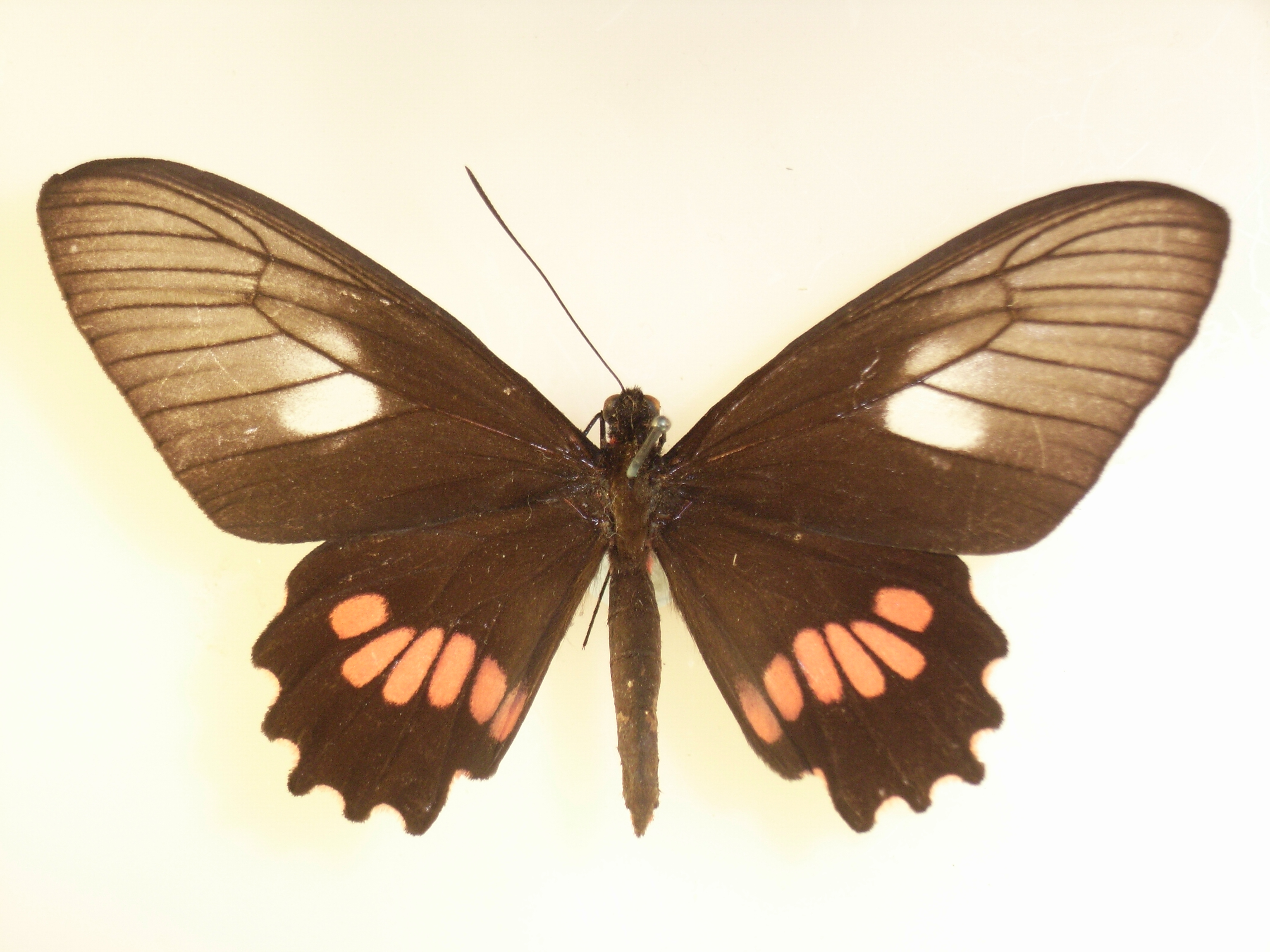

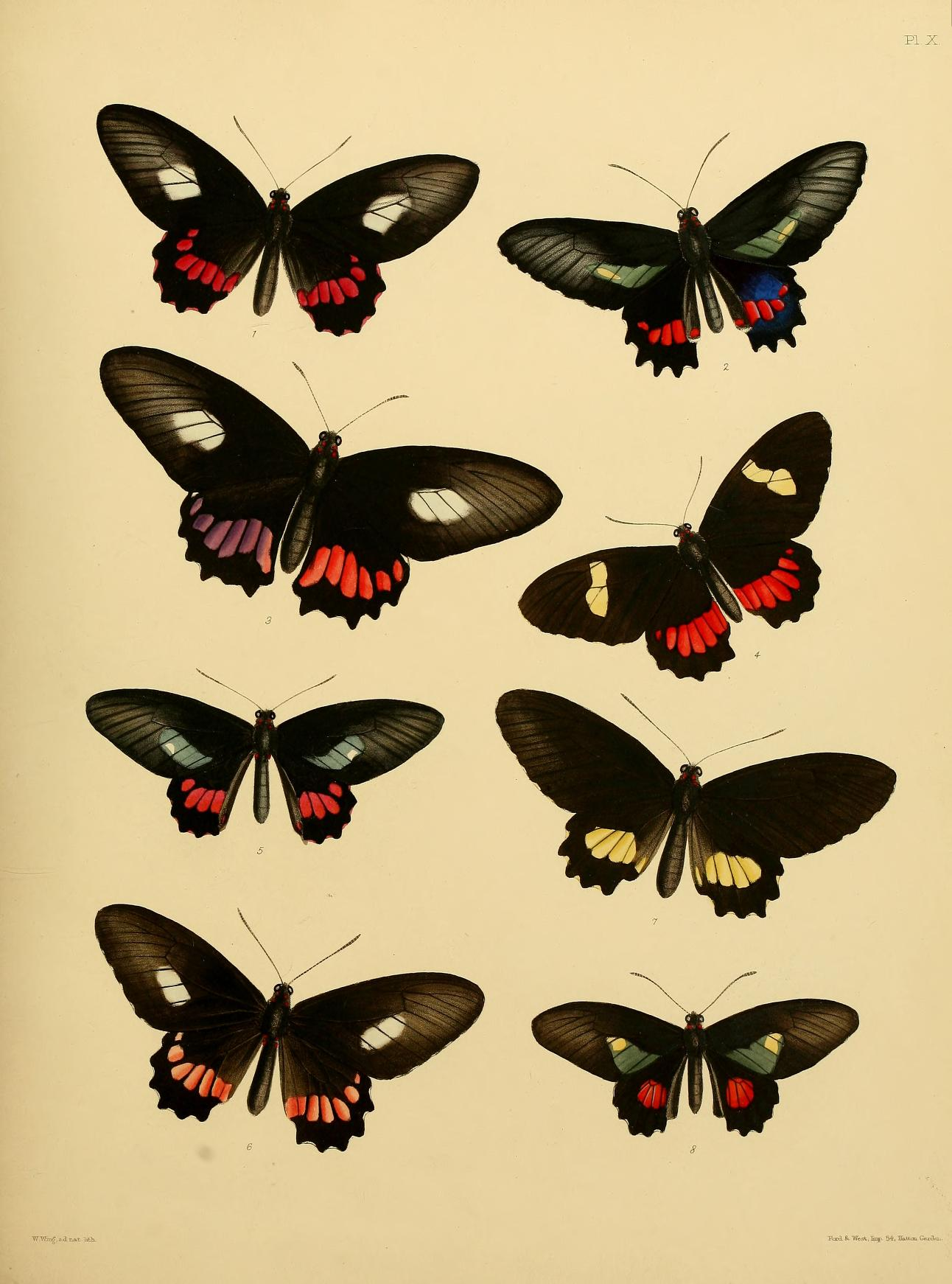

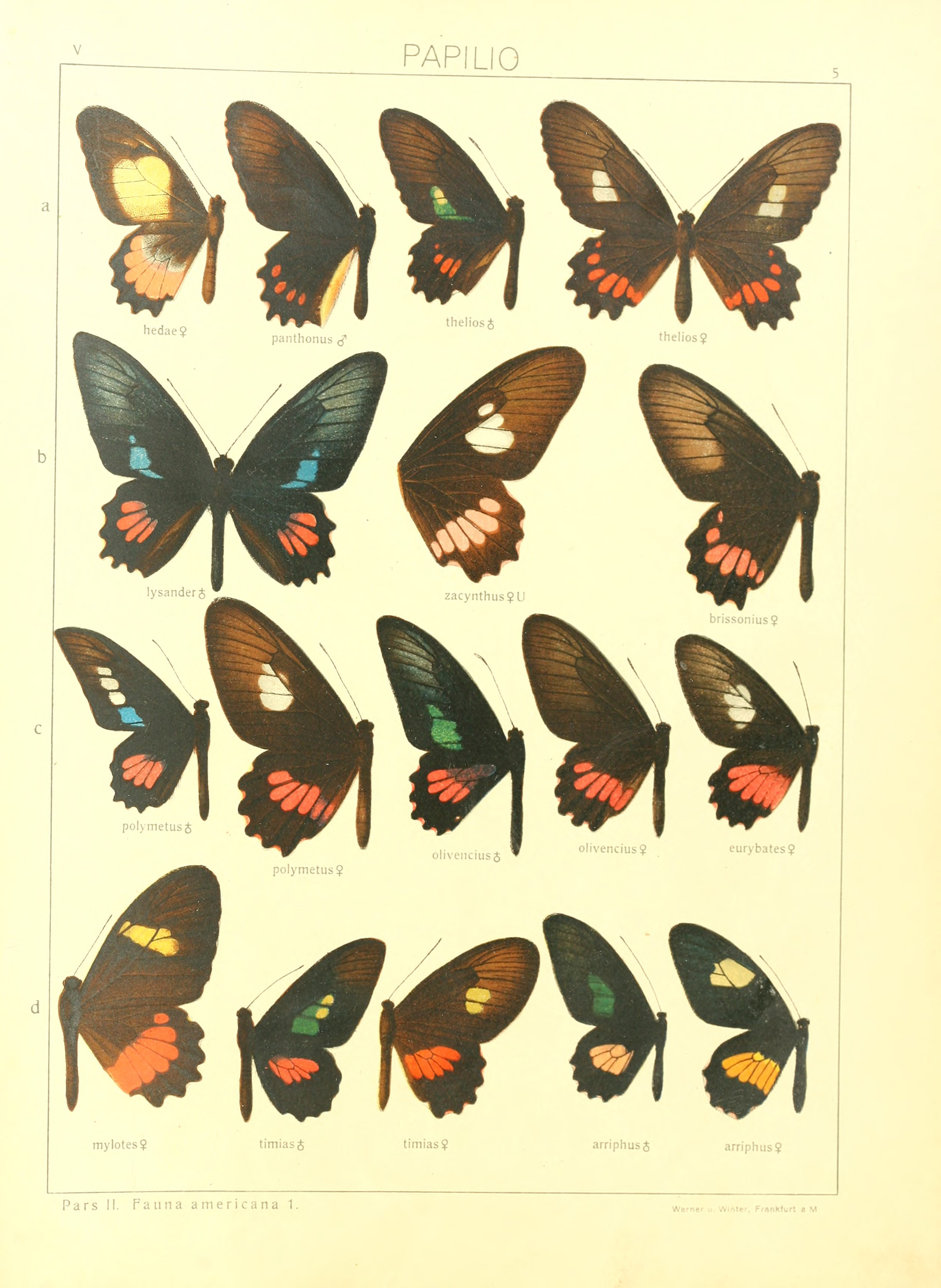

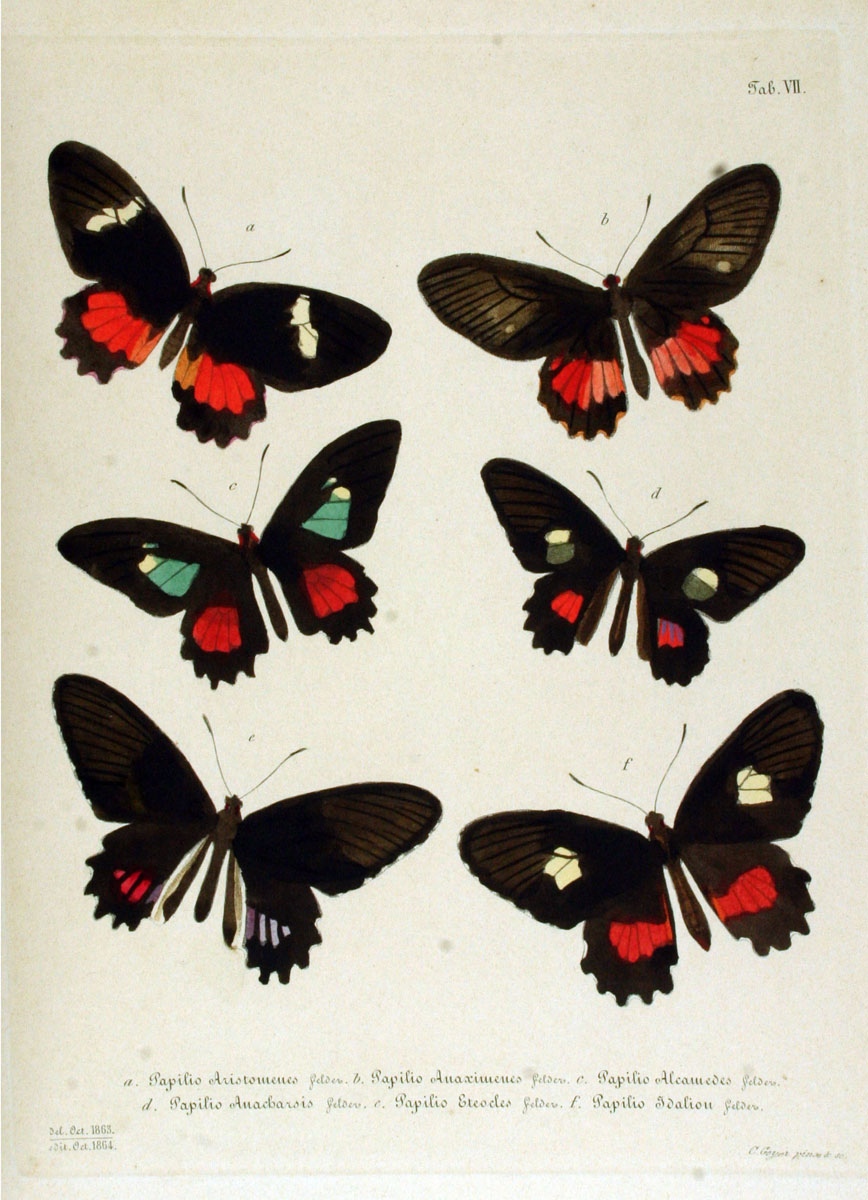

== Description from Rothschild and Jordan(1906) ==
A full description is provided by Rothschild, W. and Jordan, K. (1906)

== Taxonomy ==
Parides neophilus is a member of the aeneas species group

The members are

- Parides aeneas
- Parides aglaope
- Parides burchellanus
- Parides echemon
- Parides eurimedes
- Parides lysander
- Parides neophilus
- Parides orellana
- Parides panthonus
- Parides tros
- Parides zacynthus
