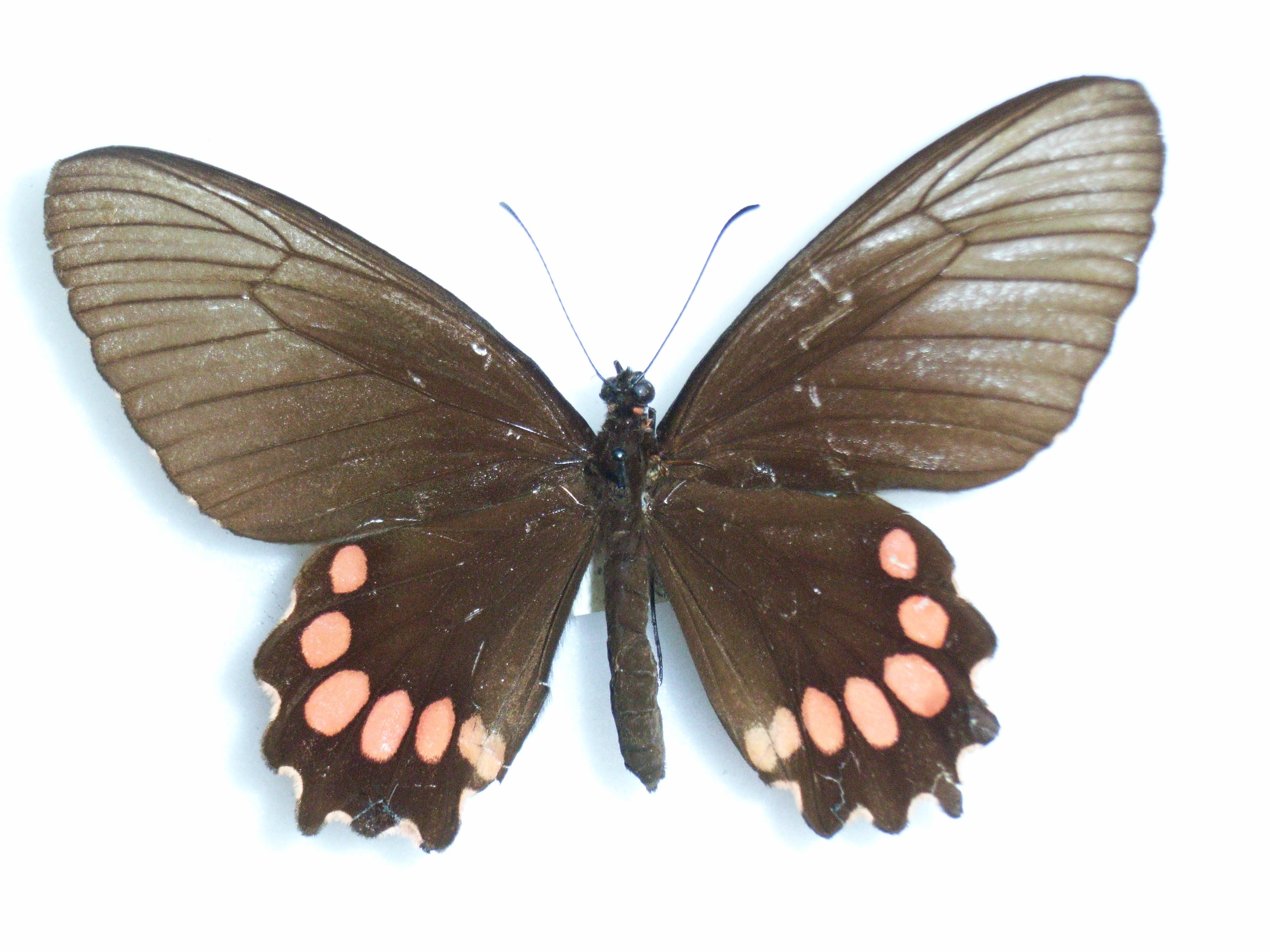
- Female
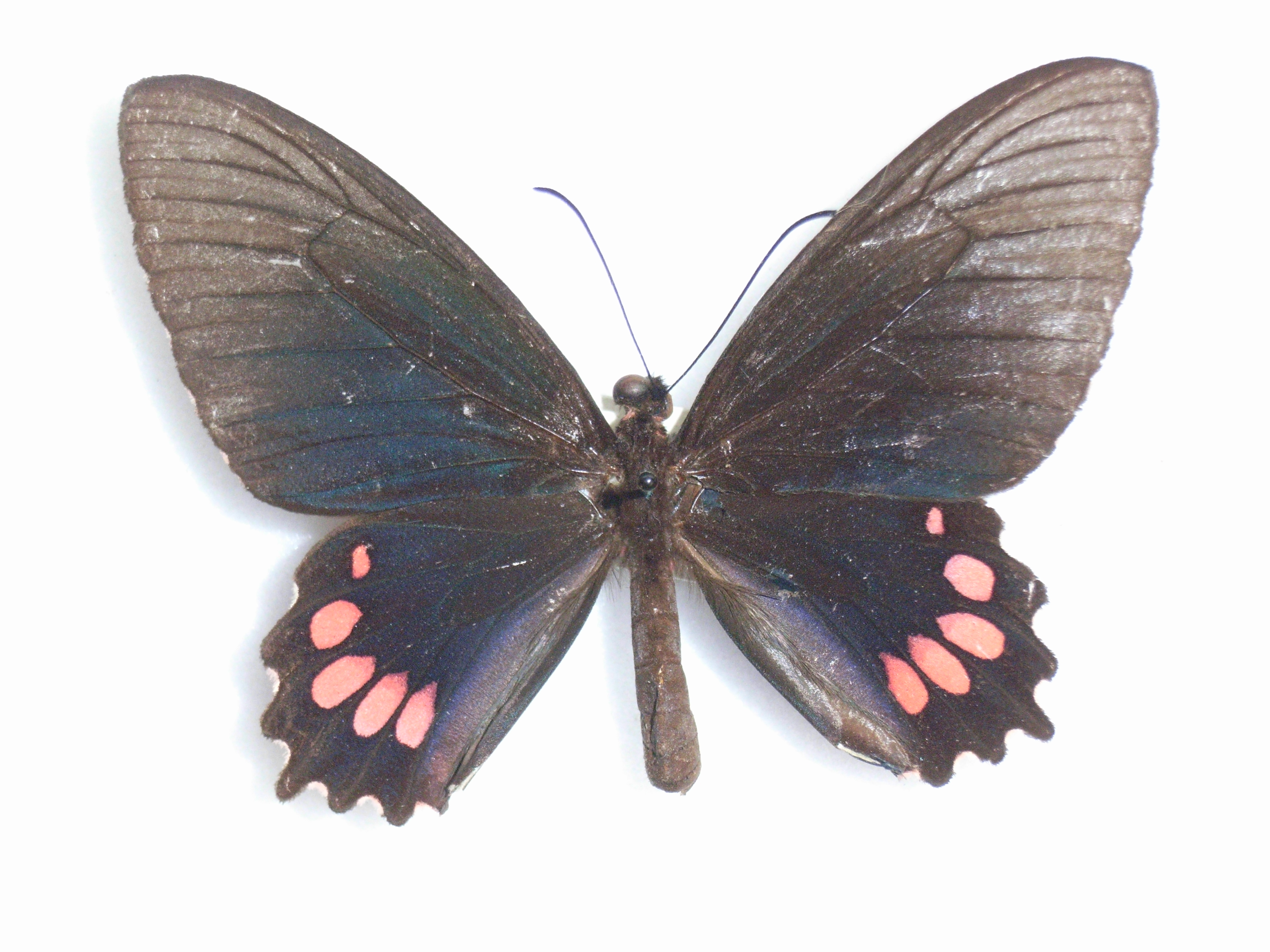
- Male

Scientific classification
- Kingdom: Animalia
- Phylum: Arthropoda
- Class: Insecta
- Order: Lepidoptera
- Family: Papilionidae
- Genus: Parides
- Species: P. panthonus

Binomial name
- Parides panthonus (Cramer, 1780)

Synonyms
- Papilio panthonus Cramer, 1780; Papilio pompeius Fabricius, [1782]

= Parides panthonus =

Species of butterfly

Parides panthonus, the panthonus cattleheart, is a butterfly of the family Papilionidae. It is found in the Guianas and Suriname.

== Subspecies ==
- P. p. panthonus (Suriname, the Guianas)
- P. p. barbotini Brévignon, 1998 (eastern French Guiana)
- P. p. phylarchus (Hopffer, 1865) (French Guiana)

== Description from Seitz ==
[Red instead of white marginal spots. The hind tibiae of the males are always dilated and with fine hairs.The red spots on the hindwing have no opalescent gloss] P. panthonus. Forewing in both sexes black, with reddish marginal spots; hindwing with a regularly curved row of separated red spots. Scent-wool white. Guiana and [following text refers to Parides burchellanus (Westwood, 1872) Brazil, in two subspecies. —numa Boisd. (= jaguarae Foett), from Brazil (São Paulo and Minas Geraes), has small, widely separated spots. — In panthonus Cr. (3 b, 5 a), from the three Guianas, the spots on the hindwing are somewhat larger. This form most probably occurs also on the north side of the Lower Amazon]

== Description from Rothschild and Jordan(1906) ==
A full description is provided by Rothschild, W. and Jordan, K. (1906) Note Papilio numa Boisduval, 1836 is Parides burchellanus jaguarae (Foetterle, 1902).

== Taxonomy ==
Parides panthonus is a member of the aeneas species group

The members are

- Parides aeneas
- Parides aglaope
- Parides burchellanus
- Parides echemon
- Parides eurimedes
- Parides lysander
- Parides neophilus
- Parides orellana
- Parides panthonus
- Parides tros
- Parides zacynthus
