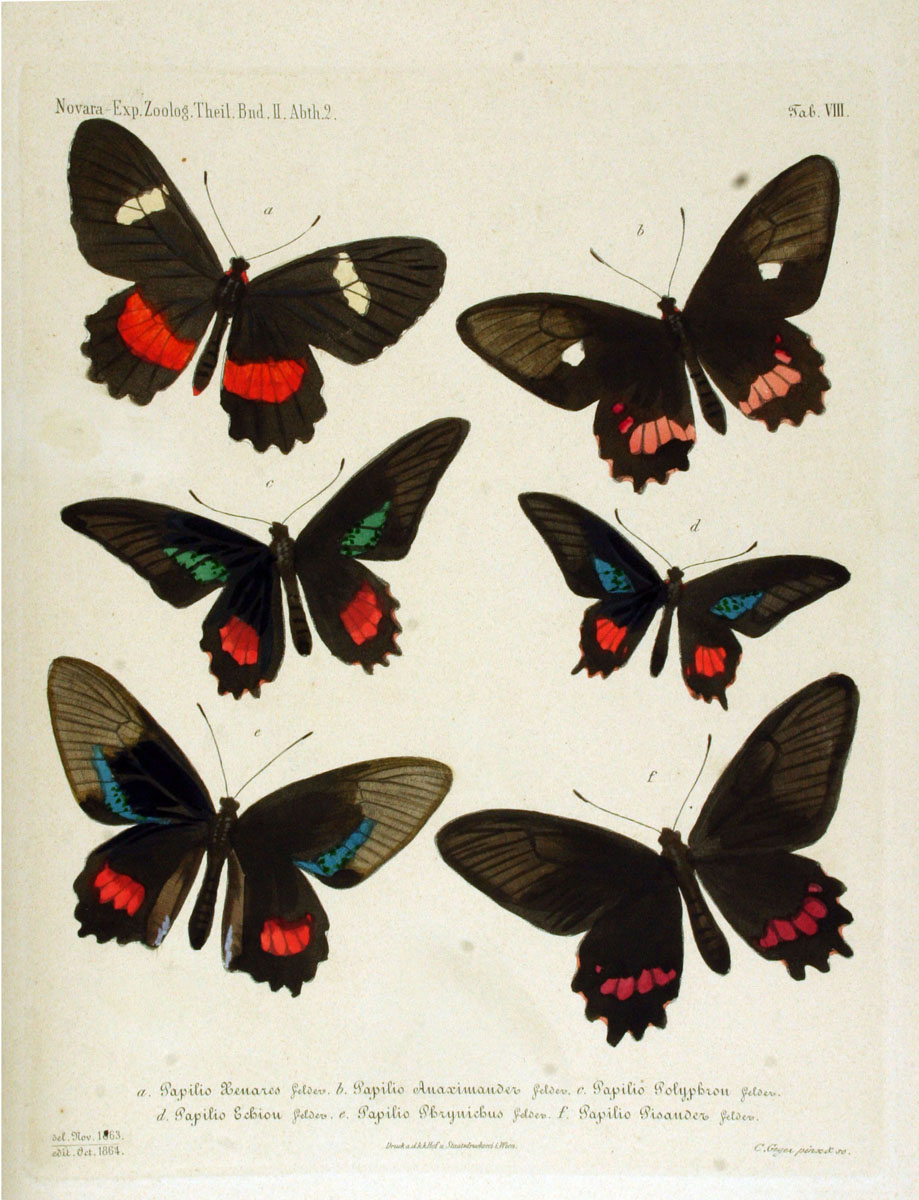
- Parides echemon as Papilio echion C. & R. Felder, 1865 and Papilio pisander C. & R. Felder, 1865

Scientific classification
- Kingdom: Animalia
- Phylum: Arthropoda
- Class: Insecta
- Order: Lepidoptera
- Family: Papilionidae
- Genus: Parides
- Species: P. echemon

Binomial name
- Parides echemon (Hübner, [1813])

Synonyms
- Princeps echemon Hübner, [1813]; Princeps echelus Hübner, [1815]; Papilio spartacus Doubleday, 1846; Papilio echelus var. spartacus Gray, [1853]; Papilio ergeteles Gray, [1853]; Papilio echelus var. echephron Bates, 1861; Papilio polyphron C. & R. Felder, 1865; Papilio echion C. & R. Felder, 1865; Papilio pisander C. & R. Felder, 1865

= Parides echemon =

Species of butterfly

Parides echemon is a species of butterfly in the family Papilionidae. It is found in the Neotropical realm.

It is common and not threatened.

== Subspecies ==
- P. e. echemon Brazil (Pará)
- P. e. ergeteles (Gray, [1853]) Guianas, French Guiana, Surinam, Brazil (Pará)
- P. e. empistocles Küppers, 1975 southeastern Peru
- P. e. pisander (C. & R. Felder, 1865) French Guiana

== Description from Seitz ==
P. echemon resembles the preceding species [lysander]; but the forewing is narrower, the outer margin being incurved in the male, straight in the female, the cell of the forewing is narrower at its extremity, the 3. radial of the hindwing is usually much nearer to the 2. radial than to the 1. median, and the fold of the hindwing in the male has no white wool. On the Lower and Middle Amazon and in the Guianas. Two subspecies. — Hubner's figures agree with the form from the Amazon: in the male echemon Hbn. (= echelus Hbn.) the blue-green band of the forewing is narrow and placed, like the white band of the female, separate from the cell. From Para to Santarem. — ergeteles Gray (= echephron Bates, echion Bates, polyphron Fldr.) has in the male a broader blue-green band, and in the female the white spot before the 2. median is contiguous to the cell, or the forewing is without spots.- female f. ergeteles Gray is the form of the female with a white area; in the female-f. pisander Fldr. the white spots are only indicated by a few white scales. From Obidos to the Rio Negro, north side of the Amazon; Guiana. — Whilst P. lysander is a swamp species and flies heavily over the wettest places in the shade of the woods, P. echemon prefers drier localities in the woods, and is often found on the flowers which hang down from the trees over the narrow paths in the forests.

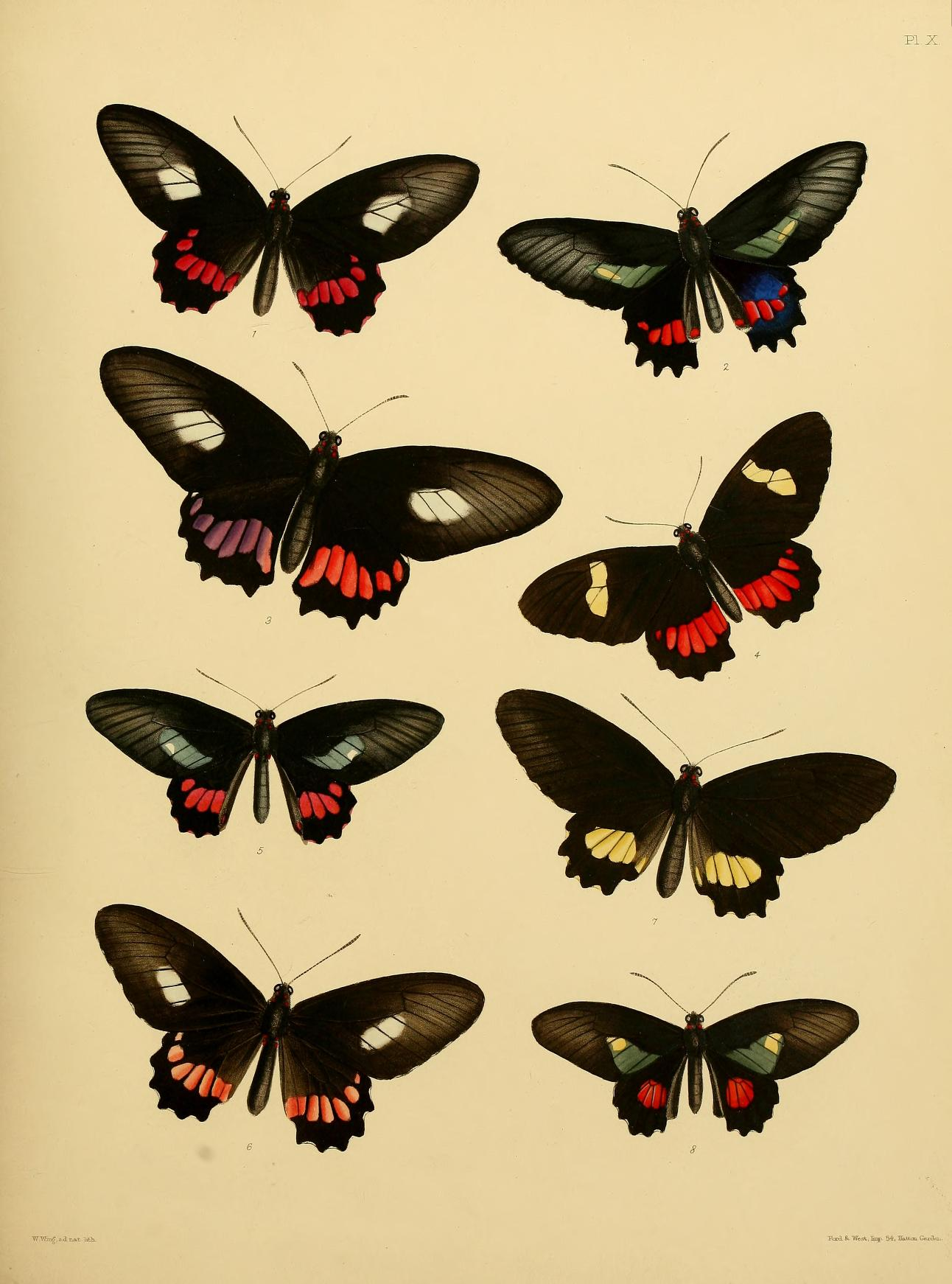
in Gray 1853 (figure 1)

== Description from Rothschild and Jordan (1906) ==
A full description is provided by Rothschild, W. and Jordan, K. (1906)

== Taxonomy ==
Parides echemon is a member of the aeneas species group

The members are

- Parides aeneas
- Parides aglaope
- Parides burchellanus
- Parides echemon
- Parides eurimedes
- Parides lysander
- Parides neophilus
- Parides orellana
- Parides panthonus
- Parides tros
- Parides zacynthus
