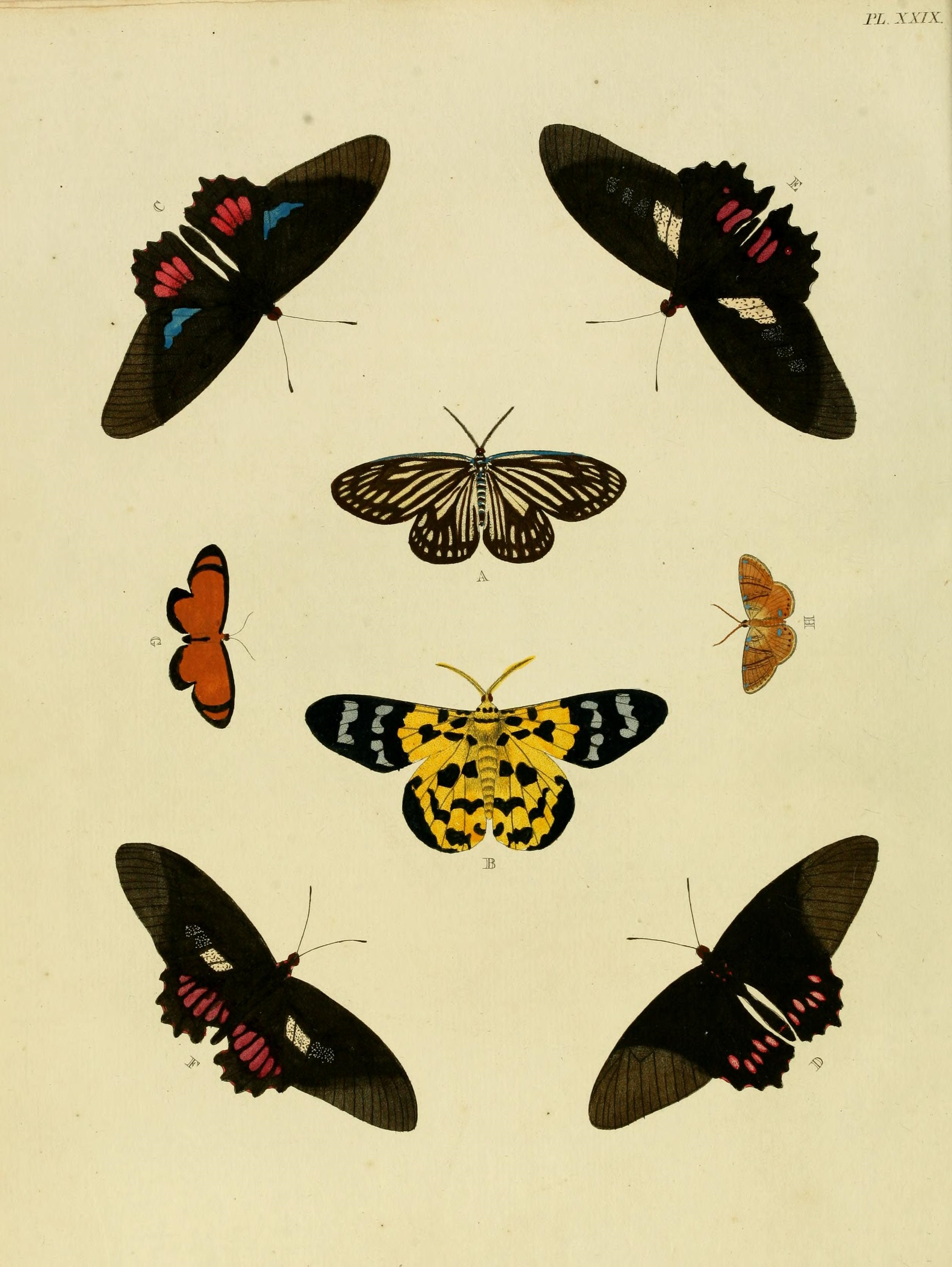
- Plate accompanying the original description in Cramer and Stoll's Uitlandsche Kapellen, P. lysander top left and bottom right

Scientific classification
- Kingdom: Animalia
- Phylum: Arthropoda
- Class: Insecta
- Order: Lepidoptera
- Family: Papilionidae
- Genus: Parides
- Species: P. lysander

Binomial name
- Parides lysander (Cramer, 1775)

Synonyms
- Papilio lysander Cramer, [1775]; Papilio euristeus Cramer, 1775; Papilio arbates Stoll, [1782]; Papilio meleander Jablonsky, 1784; Papilio eurymas Godart, 1819; Papilio anaximander C. & R. Felder, 1865; Papilio lysander var. bari Oberthür, 1879; Papilio horracki Lathy, 1916; Papilio citrulli Fabricius, 1938; Papilio scaevola Fabricius, 1938; Papilio parsodes Gray, [1853]; Papilio sonoria Gray, [1853]; Priamides brissonius Hübner, [1819]; Papilio phrynichus C. & R. Felder, 1864; Papilio lysander f. stramineus Biedermann, 1938; Papilio lysander isanae Rousseau-Decelle, 1943; Papilio lysander f. extensa Rousseau-Decelle, 1943; Papilio lysander f. reducta Rousseau-Decelle, 1943; Papilio lysander mattogrossensis Talbot, 1928; Papilio lysander ab. antalcidas Krüger, 1933

= Parides lysander =

Lysander cattleheart

Species of butterfly

Parides lysander, the Lysander cattleheart, is a species of butterfly in the family Papilionidae. It is found in the Neotropical realm.

The larvae feed on Aristolochia species including A. huberiana, A. sprucei, A. littoralis, A. ruiziana, and A. leuconeura.

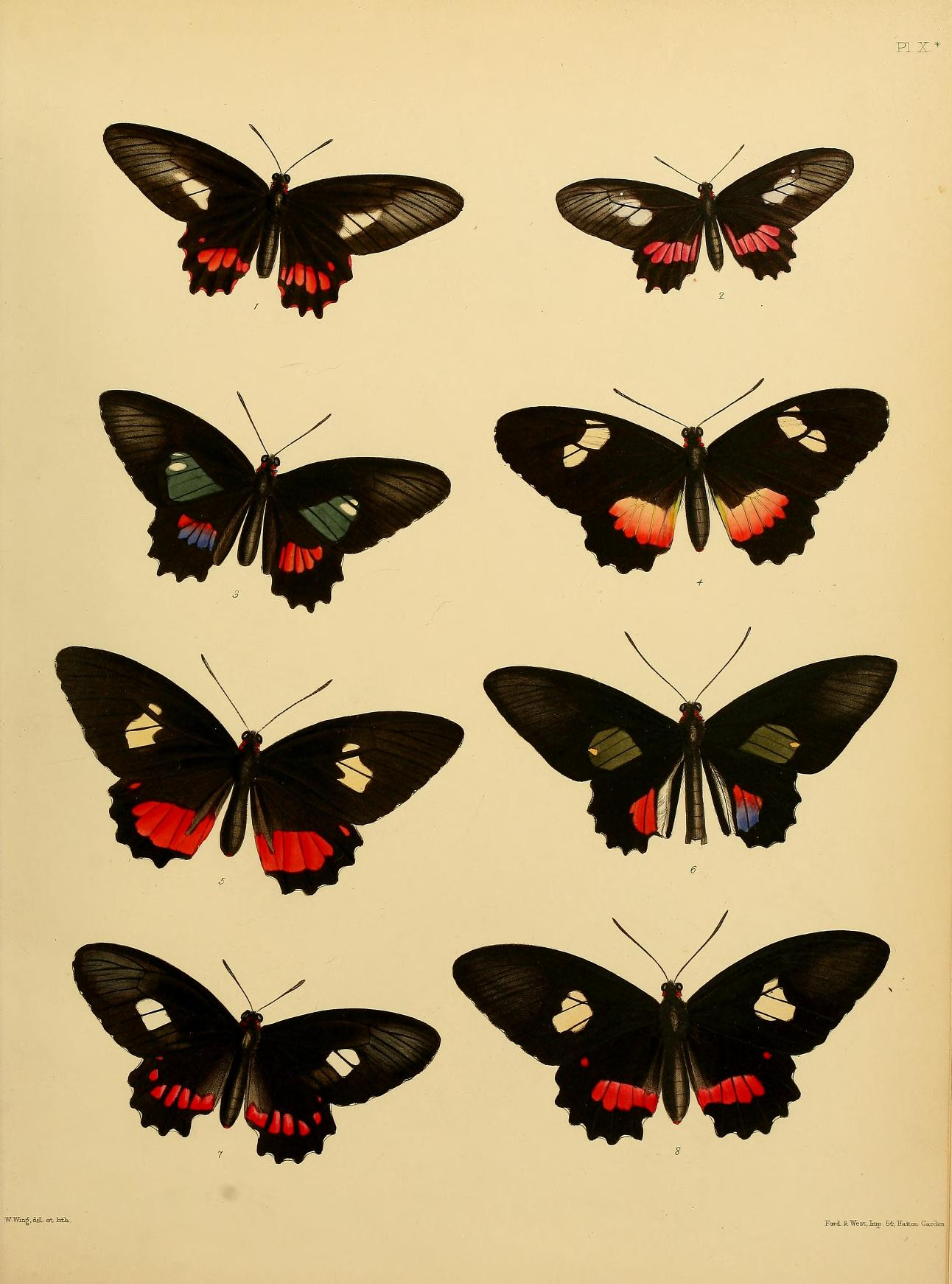
Top left is P. lysander

== Subspecies ==
- P. l. lysander Guianas
- P. l. parsodes (Gray, [1853]) Brazil (Pará)
- P. l. brissonius (Hübner, [1819]) Venezuela, Colombia, Ecuador, S.Peru, Brazil (Amazonas)
- P. l. mattogrossensis (Talbot, 1928) Brazil (Mato Grosso)
- P. l. antalcidas Tyler, Brown & Wilson, 1994 Brazil (Pará)
- P. l. orinocoensis Constantino, Le Crom & Salazar, 2002 Colombia

== Description from Seitz ==
P. lysander Cr. (= phrynichus Fldr.). Male with white scent-wool in the fold of the hindwing. Outer margin of the forewing in the female rounded; the last two red spots on the hindwing separated, standing obliquely one under the other; female-f. parsodes Gray (= sonoria Gray) has a large white area on the forewing, composed of several spots: in the female -f. arbates Stoll (= anaximenes Fldr.) the forewing has only one white spot; whilst in the female-f. brissonius Gray (5b) the forewing has no white spot at all. A male with yellow instead of red spots on the forewing has been described as ab. bari Oberth. — This species is known from the whole of the Amazon, East Peru and East Ecuador, as well as from the Guianas and Bogota; it has not hitherto been found in Bolivia nor in Brazil proper. It is a swamp species and flies heavily over the wettest places in the shade of the woods.

== Description from Rothschild and Jordan (1906) ==
A full description is provided by Rothschild, W. and Jordan, K. (1906)

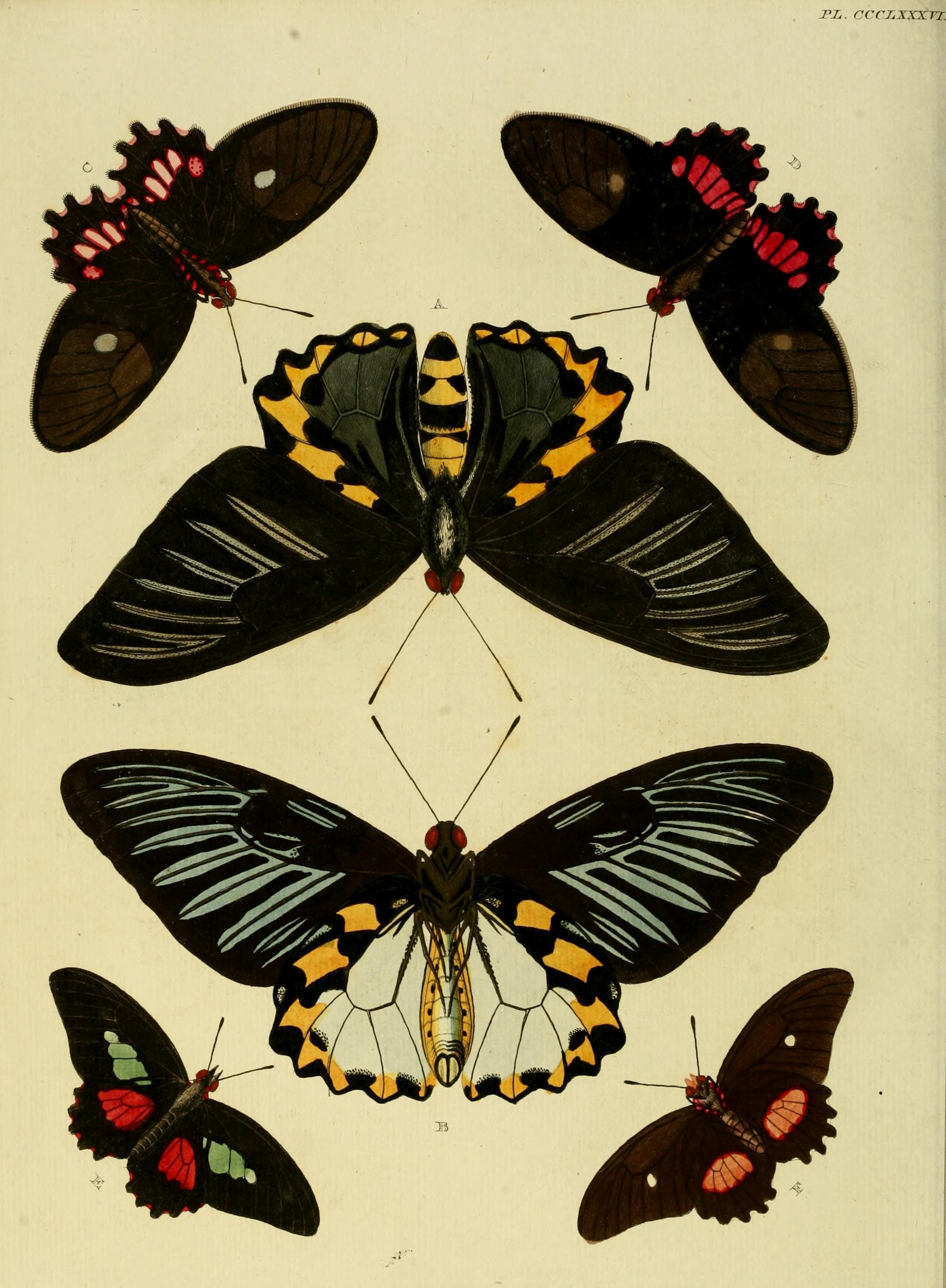

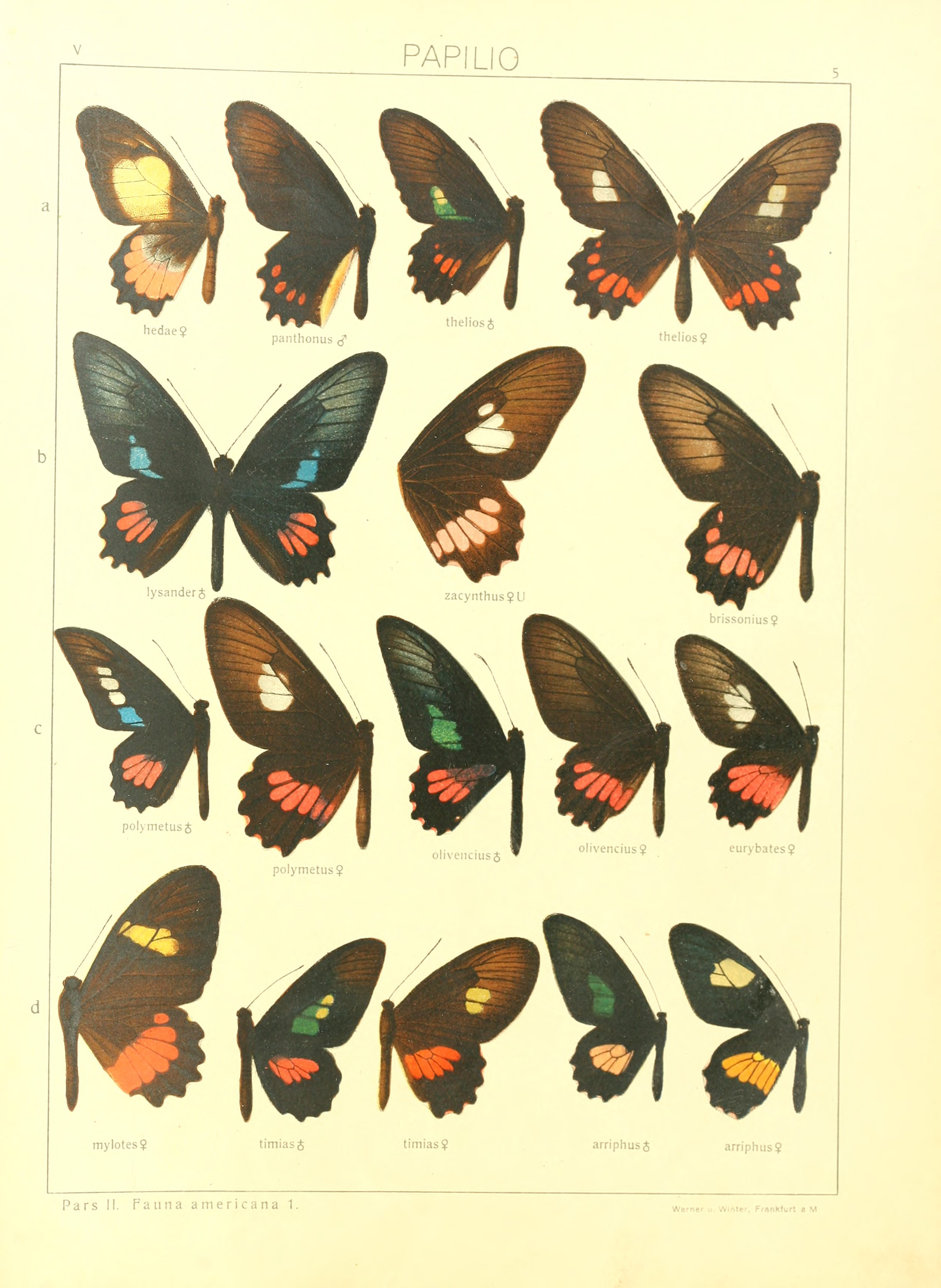

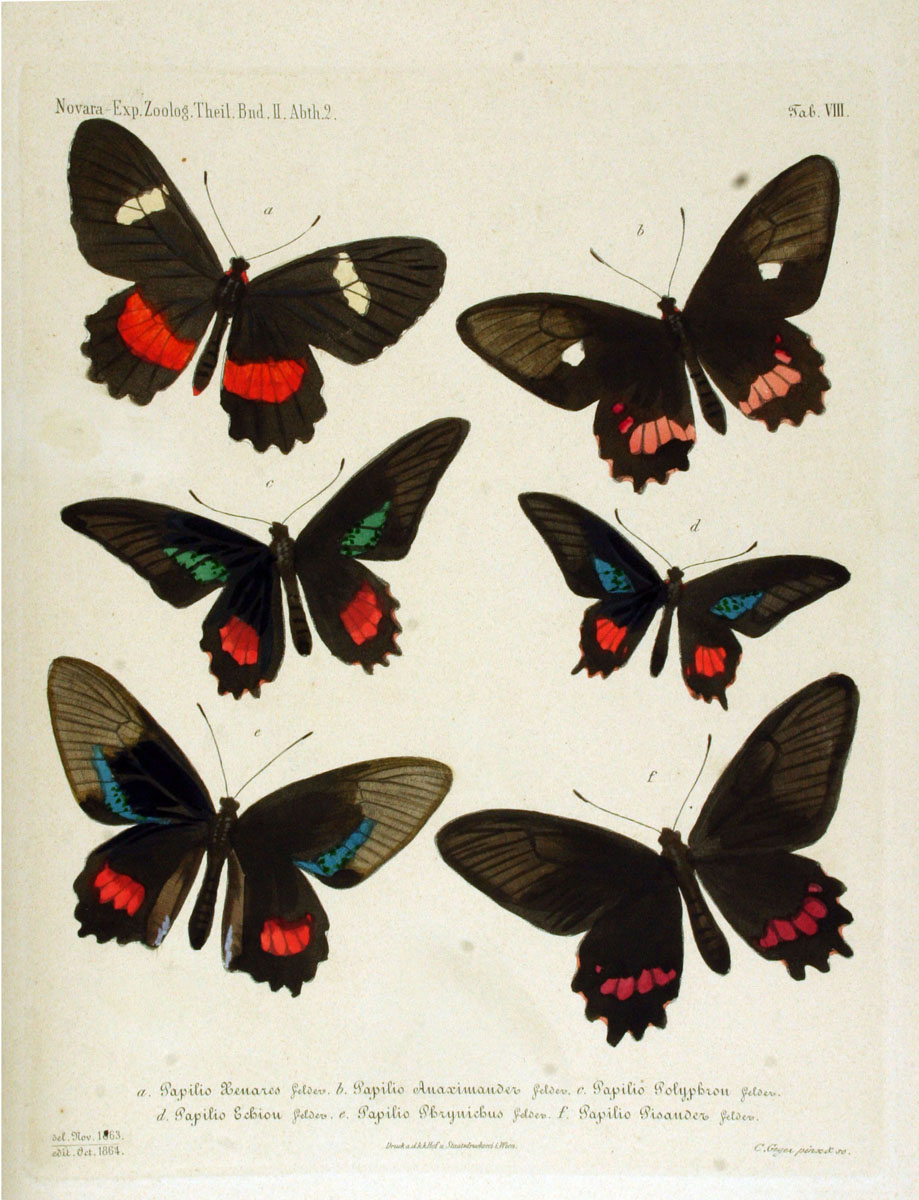

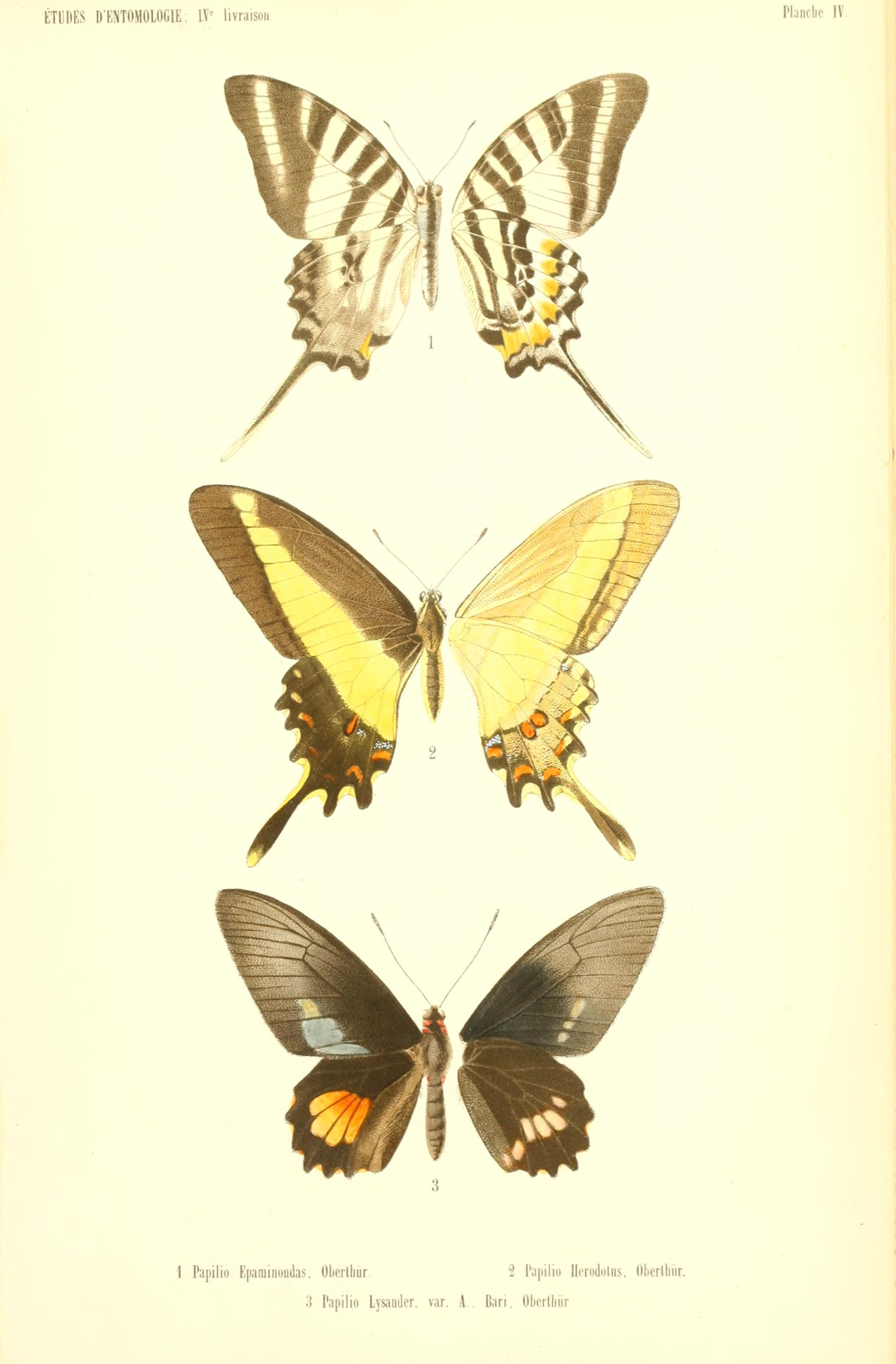

== Taxonomy ==
Parides lysander is a member of the aeneas species group:

The members are

- Parides aeneas
- Parides aglaope
- Parides burchellanus
- Parides echemon
- Parides eurimedes – mylotes cattleheart, Arcas cattleheart, pink-checked cattleheart, or true cattleheart
- Parides lysander
- Parides neophilus – spear-winged cattleheart
- Parides orellana
- Parides panthonus – panthonus cattleheart
- Parides tros
- Parides zacynthus
