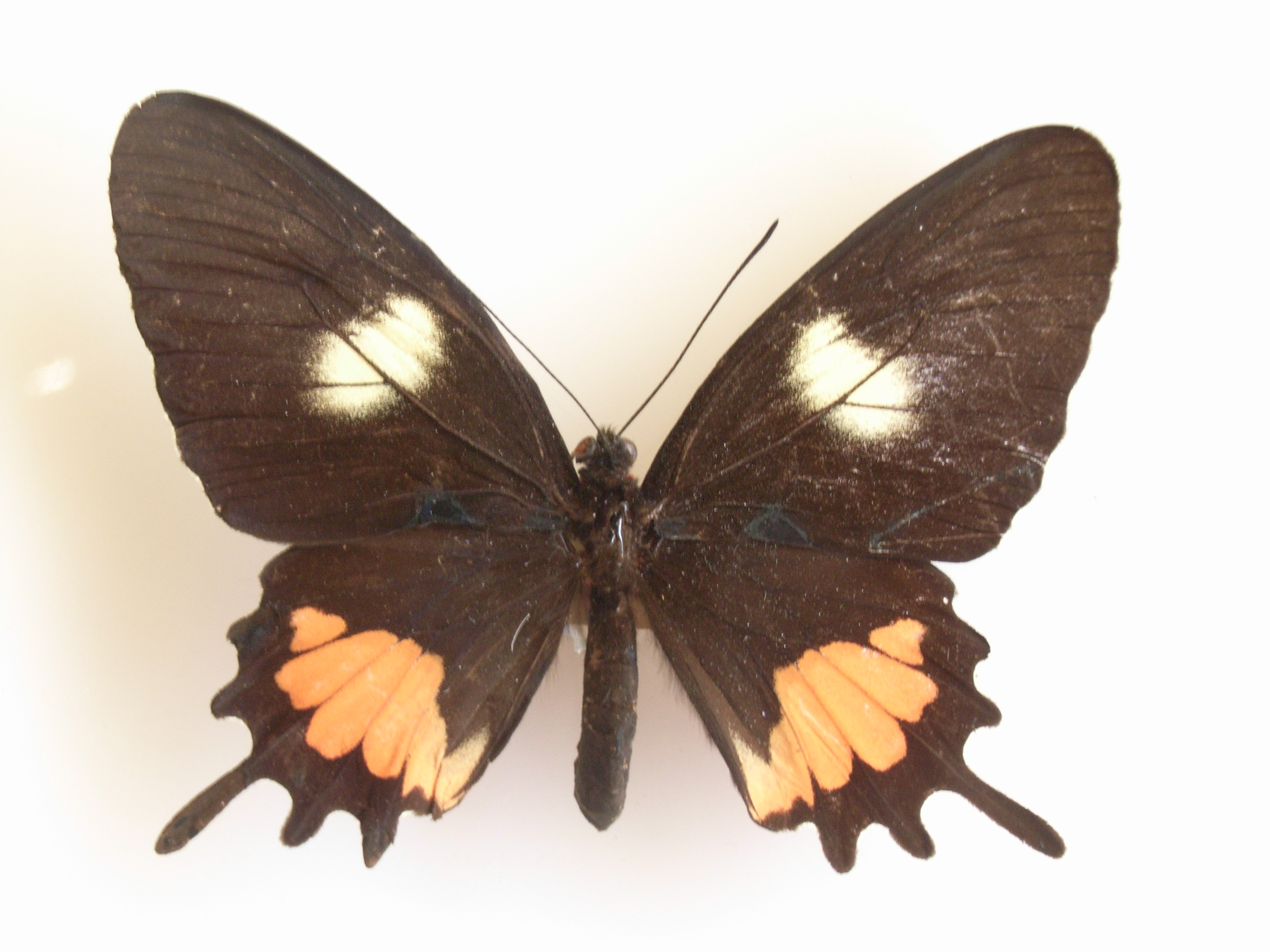
- Mounted female specimen

Scientific classification
- Kingdom: Animalia
- Phylum: Arthropoda
- Clade: Pancrustacea
- Class: Insecta
- Order: Lepidoptera
- Family: Papilionidae
- Genus: Parides
- Species: P. tros

Binomial name
- Parides tros (Fabricius, 1793)

Synonyms
- Papilio tros Fabricius, 1793; Papilio dardanus Fabricius, 1793 (preocc. Brown, 1776); Papilio opleus Godart, 1819

= Parides tros =

Species of butterfly

Parides tros is a species of butterfly in the family Papilionidae. It is found in the Neotropical realm where it is endemic to Brazil.

The larva feeds on Aristolochia species including A. rumicifolia, A. cynanchifolia (P. t. tros), A. triangularis (P. t. danunciae).

== Subspecies ==
- Parides tros tros (Brazil: Espirito Santo, Rio de Janeiro, São Paulo)
- Parides tros danunciae Mielke, Casagrande & Mielke, 2000 (Brazil: Paraná, Santa Catarina)

== Description from Seitz ==
P. dardanus Fabr. (= tros Fabr. = opleus Godt) (2 c). Tailed. Forewing in the male with a green spot before the hindmargin; the red area of the hindwing not opalescent. Female with a white area on the forewing, with obsolete margins. — An exclusively Brazilian species, which hitherto is only known from the province of Rio de Janeiro.

Seitz Plate 2

== Description from Rothschild and Jordan(1906) ==
A full description is provided by Rothschild, W. and Jordan, K. (1906) as dardanus Fabr.

== Taxonomy ==
Parides tros is a member of the aeneas species group

The members are

- Parides aeneas
- Parides aglaope
- Parides burchellanus
- Parides echemon
- Parides eurimedes
- Parides lysander
- Parides neophilus
- Parides orellana
- Parides panthonus
- Parides tros
- Parides zacynthus
