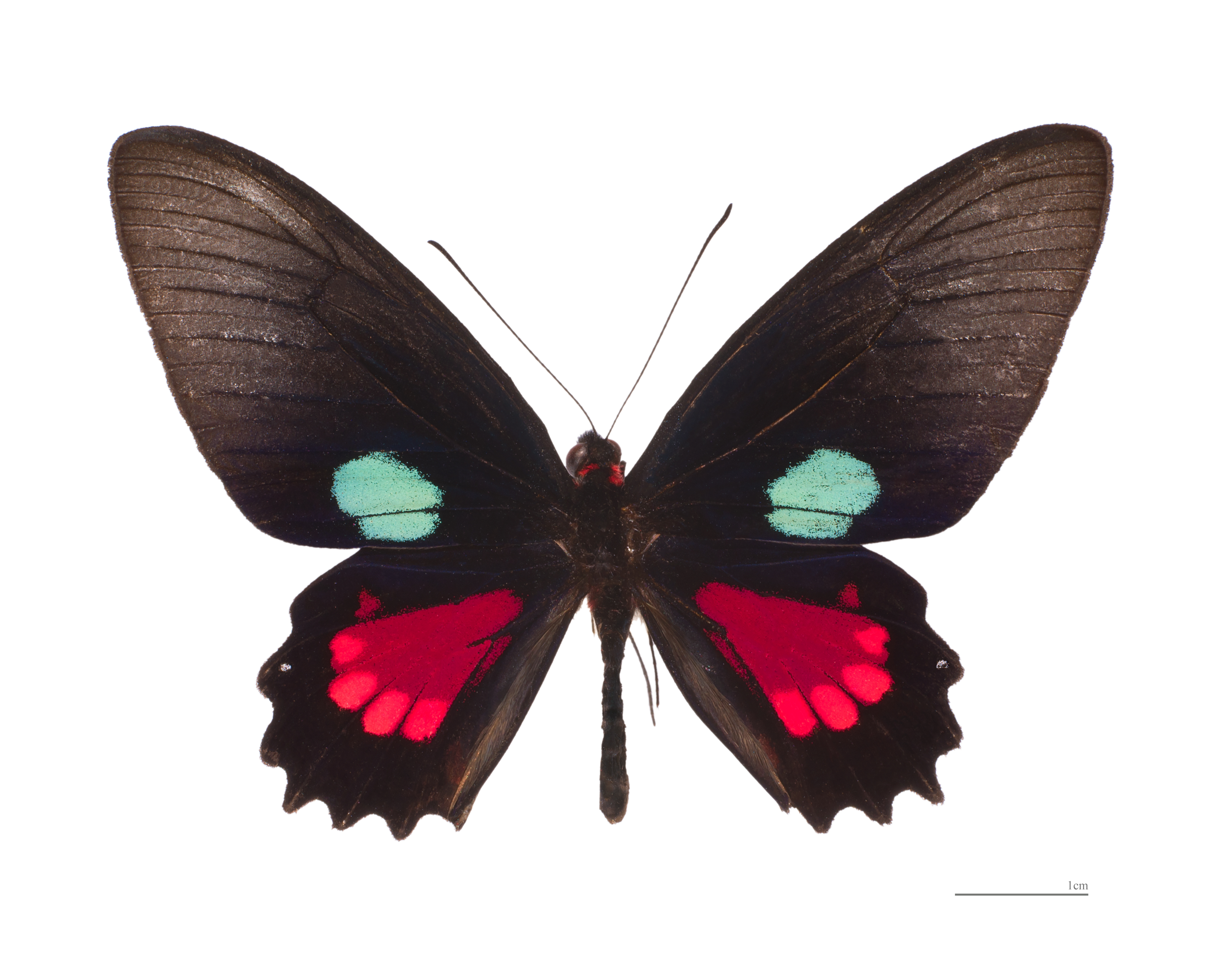
- Parides aeneas

Scientific classification
- Kingdom: Animalia
- Phylum: Arthropoda
- Clade: Pancrustacea
- Class: Insecta
- Order: Lepidoptera
- Family: Papilionidae
- Subfamily: Papilioninae
- Tribe: Troidini
- Genus: Parides; Hübner, [1819]

Species
- Numerous, see text

Synonyms
- Hectorides Hübner, 1821; Endopogon Lacordaire, 1833; Ascanides Geyer, 1837; Blakea Grote, 1875

= Parides =

Genus of butterflies

Parides, commonly called cattlehearts, is a genus of swallowtail butterflies in the family Papilionidae. They are found in the Americas (Neotropical realm). The host plants of their caterpillars are Aristolochia. The genus includes medium-sized butterflies. The wings are predominantly silky black or dark brown, with bright green, red, or yellow spots (usually green on the forewings and red on the hindwings).Females have white and bright pink spots, the size and number of which vary greatly. Almost all species do not have tails on their hindwings, with the exception of Parides gundlachianus from Cuba. In some species, the inner edge of the hindwing is expanded like an extra, pale lobe.

Like those of many other swallowtails, the caterpillars live on the pipevine genus Aristolochia,(the pipevine family). The caterpillars absorb toxins from these poisonous plants, ensuring that both the caterpillars and adult butterflies are well protected by the toxin. The characteristic colours signal this to birds. This has led to the species being somewhat very similar to each other (and to some other butterflies) in appearance and difficult or impossible to distinguish in the field.

== Species ==
Listed alphabetically within groups according to Möhn et al., with annotations according to Wilts et al. (2014):

species group: ascanius (disputed: basal/plesiomorphic?)

- Parides agavus (Drury, 1782)
- Parides alopius (Godman & Salvin, [1890]) – white-dotted cattleheart
- Parides ascanius (Cramer, [1775]) – Fluminense swallowtail
- Parides bunichus (Hübner, [1821])
- Parides gundlachianus (C. & R. Felder, 1864) – Cuban cattleheart (anchises group?)
- Parides montezuma (Westwood, 1842) – Montezuma's cattleheart (possibly new panthonus group)
- Parides phalaecus (Hewitson, 1869)
- Parides photinus (Doubleday, 1844) – pink-spotted cattleheart (basal in anchises group?)
- Parides proneus (Hübner, [1831])

species group: klagesi (incertae sedis)

- Parides klagesi (Ehrmann, 1904)

species group: chabrias

- Parides chabrias (Hewitson, 1852)
- Parides hahneli (Staudinger, 1882) – Hahnel's Amazonian swallowtail
- Parides mithras (Grose-Smith, 1902)
- Parides pizarro (Staudinger, 1884) – formerly P. steinbachi (ascanius group/incertae sedis?)
- Parides quadratus (Staudinger, 1890)
- Parides vercingetorix (Oberthür, 1888) – formerly P. coelus (ascanius group/incertae sedis?)

species group: aeneas

- Parides aeneas (Linnaeus, 1758)
- Parides aglaope (Gray, [1853]) (ascanius group/incertae sedis?)
- Parides burchellanus (Westwood, 1872) (possibly new panthonus group)
- Parides echemon (Hübner, [1813])
- Parides eurimedes (Stoll, [1782]) – pink-checked cattleheart or mylotes cattleheart
- Parides lysander (Cramer, [1775]) – Lysander cattleheart (possibly basalmost living species of group)
- Parides neophilus (Geyer, 1837) – neophilus cattleheart
- Parides orellana (Hewitson, 1852) (tentatively placed here)
- Parides panthonus (Cramer, [1780]) – panthonus cattleheart (possibly new panthonus group)
- Parides tros (Fabricius, 1793)
- Parides zacynthus (Fabricius, 1793)

species group: sesostris (sister to aeneas and/or anchises group/s?)

- Parides childrenae (Gray, 1832) – green-celled cattleheart
- Parides sesostris (Cramer, [1779]) – emerald-patched cattleheart

species group: anchises

- Parides anchises (Linnaeus, 1758) – Anchises cattleheart
- Parides cutorina (Staudinger, 1898) (ascanius group/incertae sedis?)
- Parides erithalion (Boisduval, 1836) – variable cattleheart
- Parides iphidamas (Fabricius, 1793) – Transandean cattleheart
- Parides panares (Gray, [1853]) – wedge-spotted cattleheart
- Parides phosphorus (H.W. Bates, 1861) (ascanius group/incertae sedis?)
- Parides vertumnus (Cramer, [1779])
