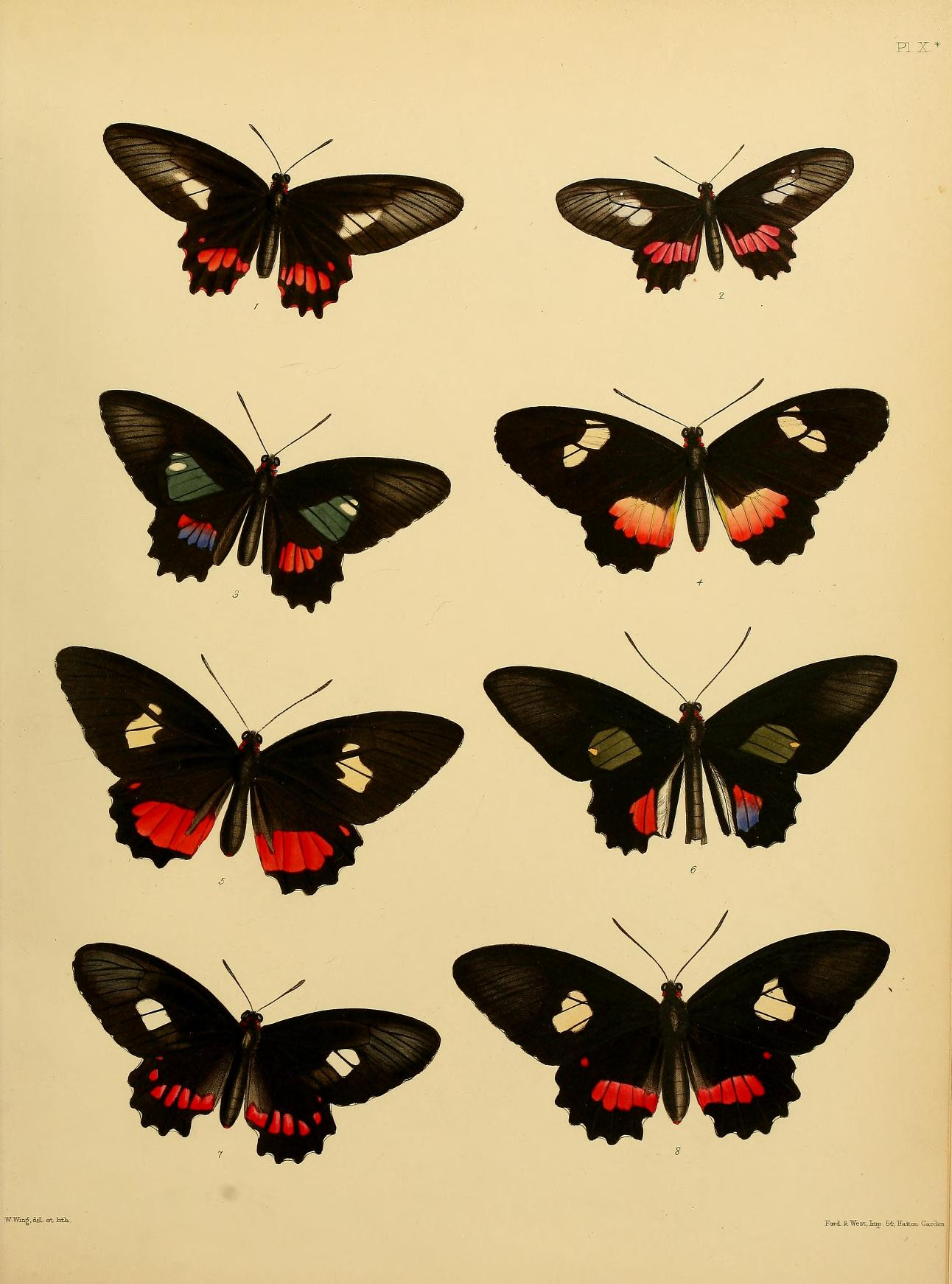
- Figures 5 and 6 accompanying Gray's original description

Scientific classification
- Kingdom: Animalia
- Phylum: Arthropoda
- Class: Insecta
- Order: Lepidoptera
- Family: Papilionidae
- Genus: Parides
- Species: P. aglaope

Binomial name
- Parides aglaope (Gray, [1853])

Synonyms
- Papilio aglaope Gray, [1853]; Papilio lysimachus Honrath, 1888; Papilio aglaope ecaudatus Joicey & Talbot, 1924; Papilio callicles Bates, 1861

= Parides aglaope =

Species of butterfly

Parides aglaope is a species of butterfly in the family Papilionidae. It is found in Brazil and Bolivia.

== Original description ==
Male. Plate X figure 5.—The primary wings deep bluish black, with the summits clearer; a greyish blue oblique band commences about the middle of the inner margam and extends to the median nervure between the first and second median nervules; this band has on its outer side, between the second and third median nervules, a quadrate white spot. The secondary wings are entirely bluish black, with the outer margin between the dentations narrowly bordered with scarlet; a transverse curved band of four longitudinal scarlet spots, with the anterior part more obscure, runs across the wing; the three first from the inner margin are of an equal size, but the fourth is smaller and somewhat quadrate. The under surface of the primary wings is black, with the summits clearer, and with two white spots between the first and third nerrales, nearer the median nervure than the outer margin. The under surface of the secondary wings is black, having a transverse curved band of five rather small pink spots, with the third and fourth larger than the others.

Female. Plate X figure 6.—The primary wings brownish black, with the summits clearer, and the outer margin ornamented with minute white spots; an oblique band of four unequal white spots, which are situated between the second discoidal nervule and the submedian nervure; viz. one above the first median nervule and the one below the third median nervule are very small, while the two others in between these are large and subquadrate. The secondary wings are brownish black, with the outer margin between the dentations white; a transverse curved band of seven spots of pale pmk; viz. two spots at the anal angle are united together and subquadrate, the third and fourth are large and oblong, while the others gradually decrease in size to the seventh, which is very small. The under surface of the primary wings is like the upperside, both in colour and marking. The under surface of the secondary wings is similar to the upperside, but the spots are pinkish white, with the posterior portion of each, and the one at the anal angle entirely, rose colour. In Collection (Brit. Mus.) from Para.

== Subspecies ==
- P. a. aglaope Brazil (Pará)
- P. a. lysimachus (Honrath, 1888) Brazil (Pará)
- P. a. ecaudatus (Joicey & Talbot, 1924) Brazil (Mato Grosso)
- P. a. castilhoi d'Almeida, 1967 Brazil (São Paulo)
- P. a. callicles (Bates, 1861) north Bolivia

== Threats ==
This species is uncommon, but far from rare and not threatened.
