= Parides orellana =

- Parides orellana with other Parides in Adalbert Seitz's Macrolepidoptera of the World

Scientific classification
- Kingdom: Animalia
- Phylum: Arthropoda
- Clade: Pancrustacea
- Class: Insecta
- Order: Lepidoptera
- Family: Papilionidae
- Genus: Parides
- Species: P. orellana

Binomial name
- Parides orellana (Hewitson, 1852)

Synonyms
- Papilio orellana Hewitson, 1852

Species of butterfly

Parides orellana is a species of butterfly in the family Papilionidae. It is found in the Neotropical realm. (Colombia, Ecuador, Venezuela, Peru, Brazil (Amazonas)).

The larvae possibly feed on Aristolochia barbata.

== Description from Seitz ==
P. orellana Hew. (2 c). The most beautiful species of the aeneas-group. Forewing in both sexes black, bluish in a side-view, with white spots on the fringes. Hindwing in the male with a very large red area, not opalescent; in the female with a broad red band. — Upper Amazon, from Ega to Iquitos.

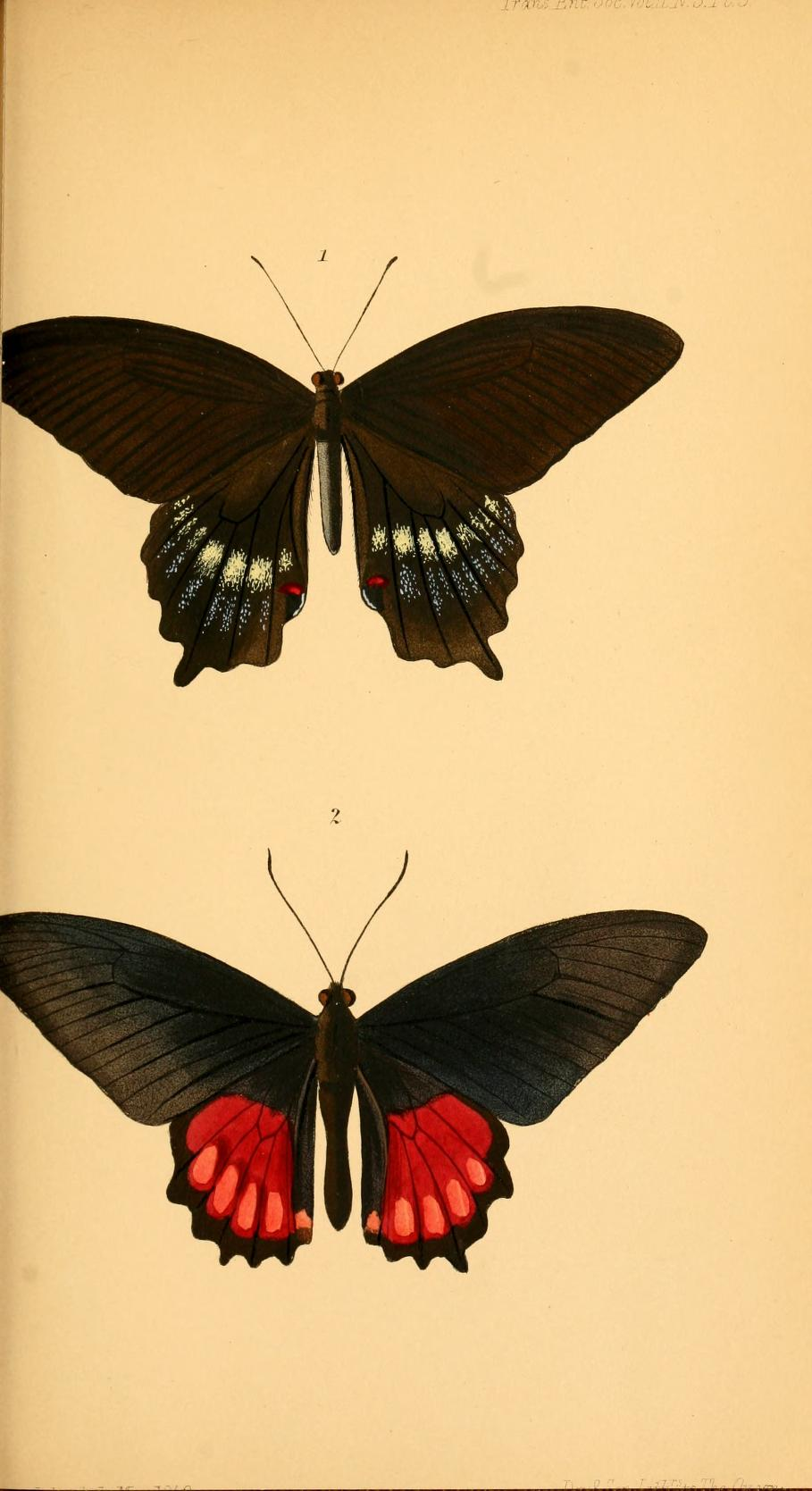
Hewitson, W. C. (1852) Plate 5

== Description from Rothschild and Jordan(1906) ==
A full description is provided by Rothschild, W. and Jordan, K. (1906)

== Taxonomy ==
Parides orellana is a member of the aeneas species group
