= Imari =

Imari may refer to:

- Imari, Saga, a city on the island of Kyushu, Japan
  - Imari porcelain, Arita ware exported from the city's port
  - Imari Station, a train station located in Imari City

== People ==
- Imari Obadele, a black nationalist, advocate for reparations, and president of the Republic of New Afrika
- Imari Samuels, an English footballer who plays for the academy of Brighton & Hove Albion

== See also ==
- Amari (disambiguation)
- Imai (disambiguation)
- Imani (disambiguation)
- Imar (disambiguation)
- Imara (disambiguation)
- Imri (disambiguation)
- Inari (disambiguation)
