= Amari =

Amari may refer to:

== Places ==
- Amari Province, Greece
- Amari Valley and town in Crete, Greece
  - Amari (municipality) in Crete, Greece
- Amari, Nepal
- Ämari, Estonia
  - Ämari Air Base, military airfield near the village

== People ==
- Mikhail Tsetlin, Russian poet and editor, writing under the pseudonym Amari
- Amari (name)

== Media ==
- Amari (group), an R&B group
- "Amari" (song), a song by J. Cole
- Amari (The Morning Show), an episode of the American television series The Morning Show

== Other uses ==
- Amari Hotels and Resorts
- Plural of amaro, a liqueur

== See also ==
- Amare (disambiguation)
- Ameri (disambiguation)
- Amri (disambiguation)
- Imari (disambiguation)
- Amharic, an Ethio-Semitic language
