= Amari (name) =

Amari is both a surname and given name. Notable people with the name include:

== Surname ==
- Akira Amari (甘利 明; born 1949), Japanese politician
- Amari Masatada (甘利 昌忠; 1543–1564), Japanese samurai of the Sengoku period
- Amari Torayasu (甘利 虎泰; 1498–1548), Japanese samurai of the Sengoku period
- Carl Amari (born 1963), American actor, director, producer and nationally syndicated radio host
- John Amari (born 1948), American politician and judge
- Michele Amari (1806–1889), Italian patriot and historian
- Raja Amari (born 1971), Tunisian film director
- Samai Amari (born 1980), Indonesian professional racing cyclist
- Shun'ichi Amari (甘利 俊一; born 1936), Japanese scholar

== Given name ==
- Amari Allen (born 2006), American basketball player
- Amari Bailey (born 2004), American basketball player
- Amari'i Bell (born 1994), professional footballer
- Amari Burney (born 2000), American football player
- Amari Cheatom, American actor
- Amari Cooper (born 1994), American football player
- Amari Gainer (born 2000), American football player
- Amari Henderson (born 1997), American football player
- Amari McNeill (born 2003), American football player
- Amari Middleton (born 2003), American rapper also known as OsamaSon
- Amari Morgan-Smith (born 1989), English footballer
- Amari Saifi (born 1968), leader of the Islamist militia
- Amari Spievey (born 1988), American football safety
- Amari Williams (born 2002), British basketball player

== See also ==
- Amara (disambiguation) § People
- Amare (disambiguation) § People
