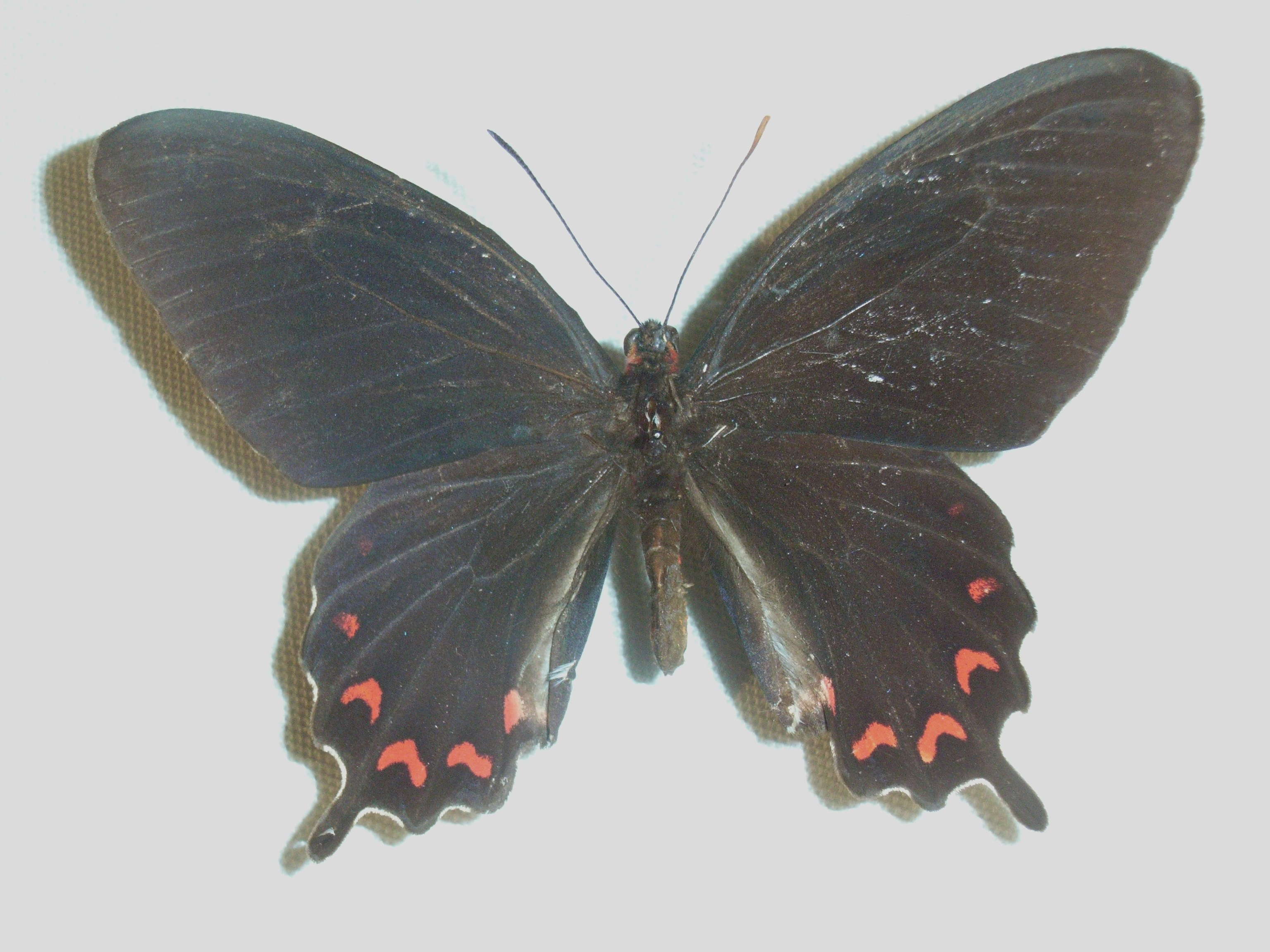

Scientific classification
- Kingdom: Animalia
- Phylum: Arthropoda
- Clade: Pancrustacea
- Class: Insecta
- Order: Lepidoptera
- Family: Papilionidae
- Genus: Parides
- Species: P. montezuma

Binomial name
- Parides montezuma (Westwood, 1842)

= Parides montezuma =

Montezuma's cattleheart

Species of butterfly

Parides montezuma, the Montezuma's cattleheart, is a butterfly in the family Papilionidae. It is native to the Americas.

== Description ==
The upperside of the wings is black, without a band and with one row of red crescents along the hindwing margin. The underside of the wings is almost the same as the upperside. A full description is provided by Rothschild, W. and Jordan, K. (1906)

== Distribution and habitat ==
P. montezuma is found in dry forests from Mexico to Costa Rica, occurring from sea level to 700 m (2,300 ft). It is rare in Costa Rica, being more common northward. It is not threatened.

== Host plants ==
- Aristolochia acanthophylla
- Aristolochia foetida – Jalisco Dutchman's pipe
- Aristolochia grandiflora – pelican flower
- Aristolochia micrantha
- Aristolochia orbicularis

Parides montezuma is a member of the ascanius species group ("Fringe-spots white. Hindwing with submarginal spots and usnally also diseal spots or dots, or a discal band; mostly with tail") A quadrate whitish spot in space 2 of the forewings is quite peculiar of the ascanius group

The members are

- Parides agavus (Drury, 1782)
- Parides alopius (Godman & Salvin, [1890])
- Parides ascanius (Cramer, [1775])
- Parides bunichus (Hübner, [1821])
- Parides gundlachianus (C. & R. Felder, 1864)
- Parides montezuma (Westwood, 1842)
- Parides phalaecus (Hewitson, 1869)
- Parides photinus (Doubleday, 1844)
- Parides proneus (Hübner, [1831])

== Etymology ==
The specific epithet honours the Aztec king Montezuma.
