= Aregawi =

Aregawi is a surname. Notable people with the surname include:

- Abeba Aregawi (born 1990), Ethiopian-born Swedish middle-distance runner
- Berihu Aregawi Ethiopian long-distance runner
- Abuna Aregawi, Ethiopian saint
- Amare Aregawi, Ethiopian journalist
- Sebhat Aregawi (?–1914), Ethiopian Ras
