= The Reporter (Ethiopia) =

Ethiopian weekly newspaper

- Free Press, Free Speech, Free Spirit
- Type: Weekly newspaper
- Format: Tabloid
- Owner(s): Media and Communications Center
- Editor-in-chief: Ashenafi Endale
- General manager: Amare Aregawi
- Founded: 1995; 31 years ago
- Language: English & Amharic
- Headquarters: House No. New, Kebele 03/05, Bole, Addis Ababa
- Website: thereporterethiopia.com (in English) ethiopianreporter.com (in Amharic)

The Reporter (Amharic: ሪፖርተር, romanized: Rīporiteri), also known as The Ethiopian Reporter, is a private newspaper published in Addis Ababa, Ethiopia. It appears in both English and Amharic, and is owned by the Media and Communications Center. The general manager and founder of the newspaper is Amare Aregawi.

== History ==
The Reporter was founded in 1995 by the Media and Communications Center. As of 2010, its editor and owner was Amare Aregawi.

On 2 November 2026, the Ethiopian Media Council released a statement accusing The Reporter's English and Amharic editions of repeatedly publishing reports that undermined national interests, damaged Ethiopia's image, threatened national security, and violated journalistic ethics. It announced it was suspending the registration certificate of the Media and Communications Center. The suspension occurred two days after The Reporter published an editorial titled "Press Freedom Is Not A Luxury!" that criticised Ethiopian authorities for treating independent journalism as a "national security threat", and called for the release of all imprisoned journalists in the country.

== Products ==
- Print newspaper
- Website
- Mobile
- English version
- Amharic version

== Staff ==
Yacob Wolde-Mariam, a renowned journalist, has been a senior editor with the newspaper since its inception. Yibekal Getahun is the chief graphic designer of the newspaper.

== Controversies ==
On 22 August 2008, police arrested the editor of The Reporter, Amare Aregawi, in Gondar, in connection with an article that criticised Dashen Brewery's, a local beer brand, labour practices. He was held in custody for six days after a defamation lawsuit was filed against the newspaper by the brewery in a Gondar court.
