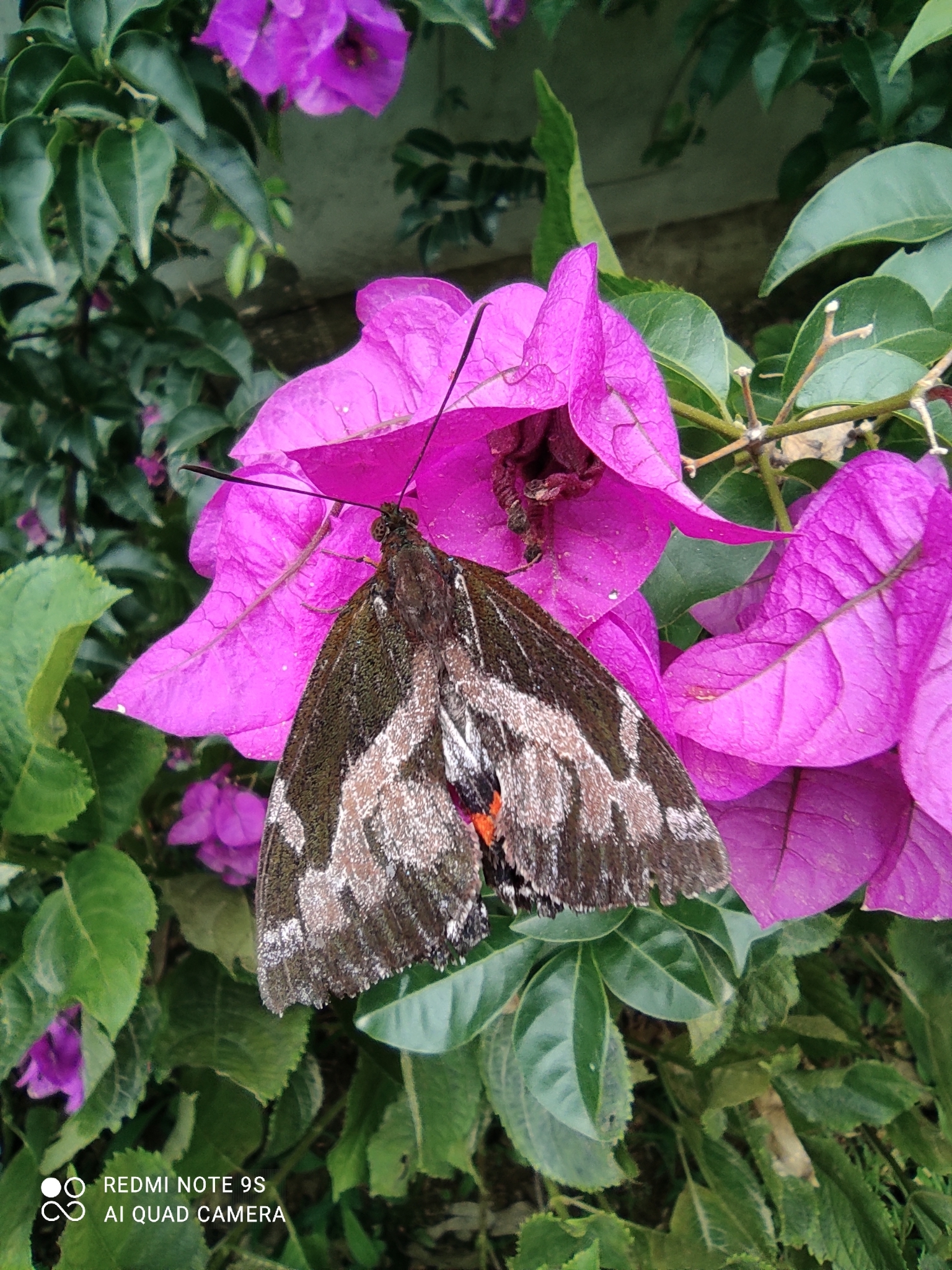

Scientific classification
- Domain: Eukaryota
- Kingdom: Animalia
- Phylum: Arthropoda
- Class: Insecta
- Order: Lepidoptera
- Family: Castniidae
- Genus: Imara
- Species: I. pallasia

Binomial name
- Imara pallasia (Eschscholtz, 1821)

Synonyms
- Castnia pallasia Eschscholtz, 1821; Castnia brecourt Godart, [1824]; Castnia ardalus Dalman, 1824; Castnia f. lativittata Strand, 1913; Castnia f. umbratula Strand, 1913; Castnia var. nigrescens Houlbert, 1918

= Imara pallasia =

Species of moth

Imara pallasia is a moth in the Castniidae family. It is found in south-eastern Brazil. It is found along cloud forests.

Adults have been observed hill-topping with several Morpho and Nymphalidae species. It is thought to be a mimic of Parides ascanius.
