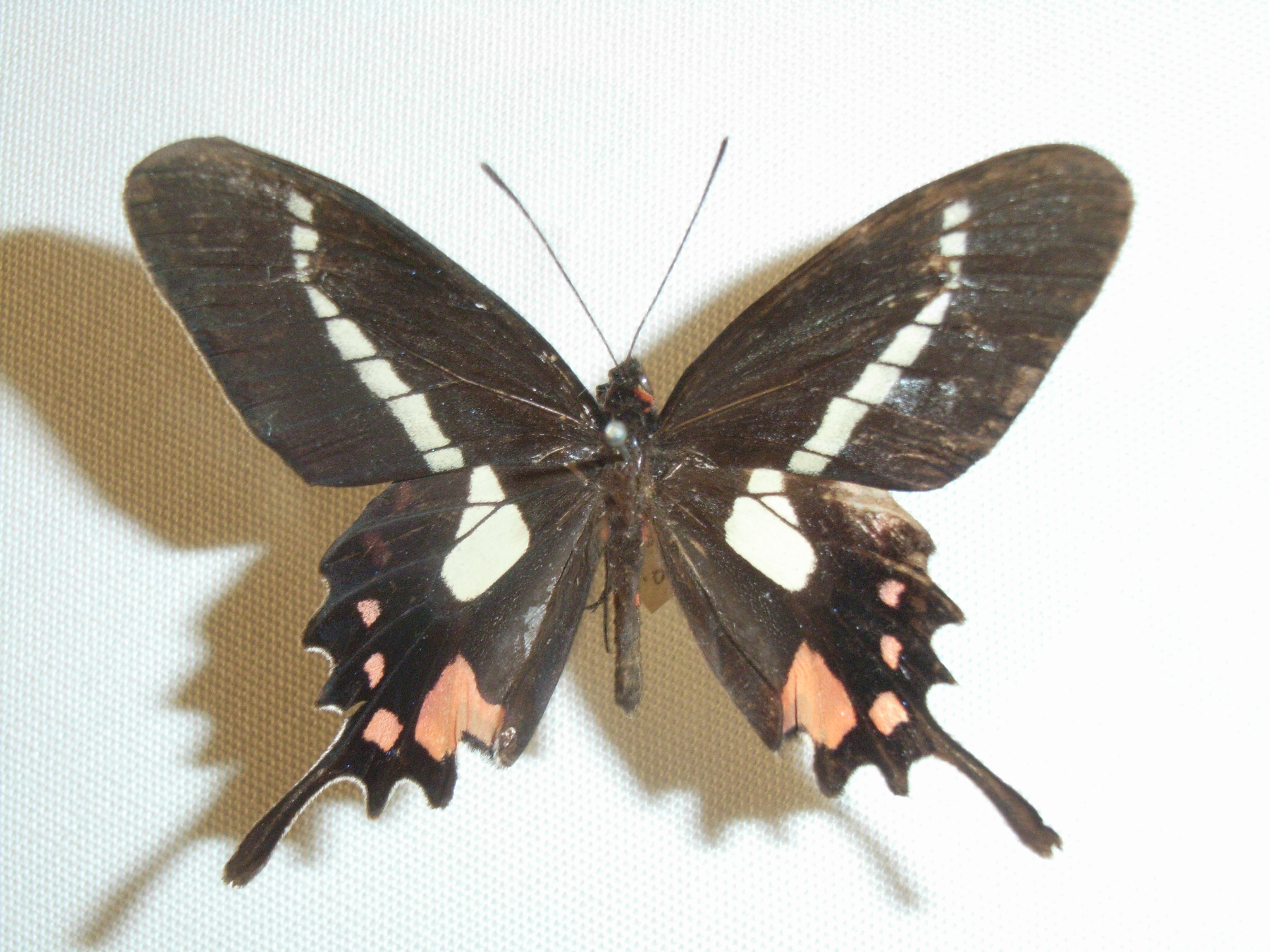

Scientific classification
- Kingdom: Animalia
- Phylum: Arthropoda
- Class: Insecta
- Order: Lepidoptera
- Family: Papilionidae
- Genus: Parides
- Species: P. agavus

Binomial name
- Parides agavus (Drury, 1782)

Synonyms
- Papilio agavus Drury, 1782; Papilio agavus ab. aurimaculatus Clerat, 1922; Papilio agavus ab. furvescens d'Almeida, 1928

= Parides agavus =

Species of butterfly

Parides agavus, the Agavus Cattleheart, is a species of butterfly in the family Papilionidae. It is found in Brazil, Paraguay, and north Argentina.

The red anal spot of the hindwing very large and z-shaped. The abbreviated white band of the hindwing is somewhat variable. A full description is provided by Rothschild, W. and Jordan, K. (1906) The sexes are similar.

It is not uncommon, even in gardens. Adults frequent flowers. It is not thought to be threatened. Parides agavus is ranched in Brazil.

The larvae feed on Aristolochia triangularis and Aristolochia fimbriata.

== Description from Seitz ==
P. agavus Drury (lb). The red anal spot of the hindwing very large, Z-shaped. The abbreviated white band of the hindwing is somewhat variable. Although the species is quite common even in gardens in the neighbourhood of Rio, especially in damp, shady places, we are still ignorant of its early stages. The insect frequents flowers, and is easy to catch. — Minas Geraes southwards to Rio Grande do Sul, westwards to Paraguay and the adjoining parts of Argentina; not extending to the foot of the Andes.

== Taxonomy ==
Parides agavus is a member of the ascanius species group ("Fringe-spots white. Hindwing with submarginal spots and usnally also discal spots or dots, or a discal band; mostly with tail"). A quadrate whitish spot in space 2 of the forewings is quite peculiar of the ascanius group

The members are

- Parides agavus (Drury, 1782)
- Parides alopius (Godman & Salvin, [1890])
- Parides ascanius (Cramer, [1775])
- Parides bunichus (Hübner, [1821])
- Parides gundlachianus (C. & R. Felder, 1864)
- Parides montezuma (Westwood, 1842)
- Parides phalaecus (Hewitson, 1869)
- Parides photinus (Doubleday, 1844)
- Parides proneus (Hübner, [1831])

== Etymology ==
It is named in the classical tradition. In Greek mythology Agave was a Nereid.
