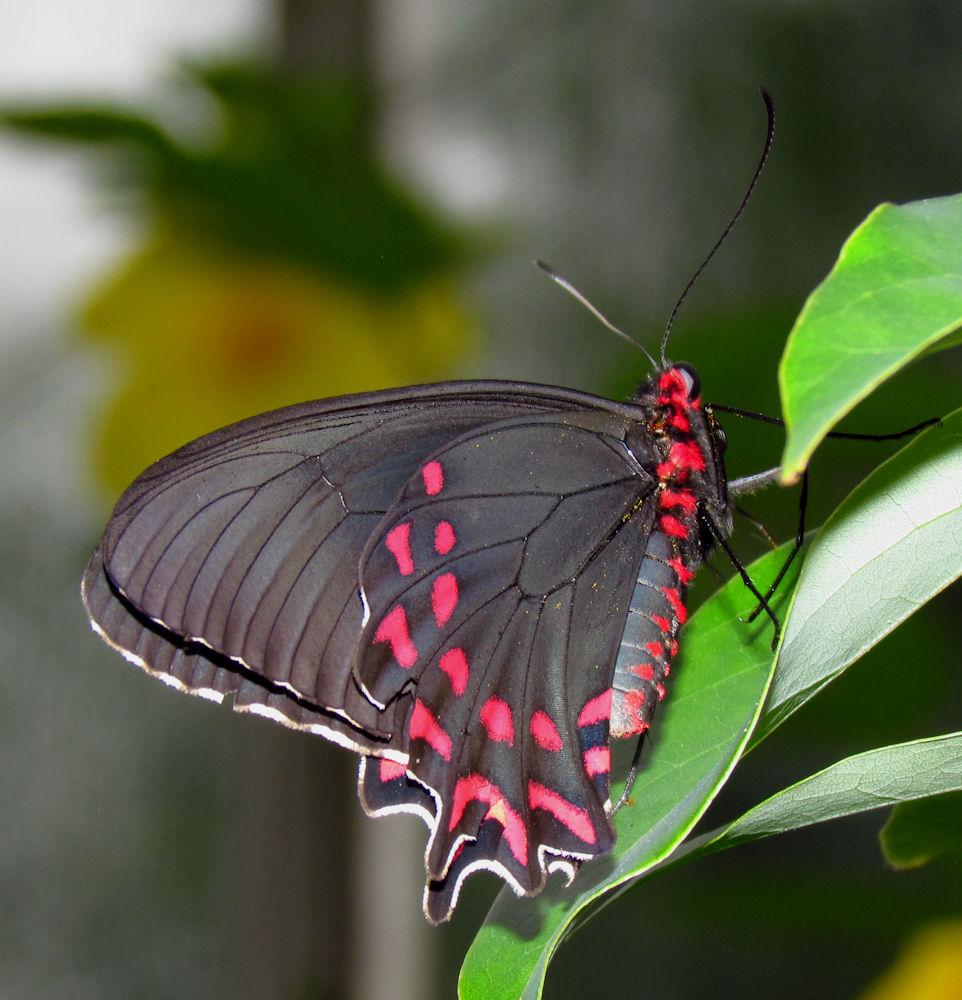
- Ventral view
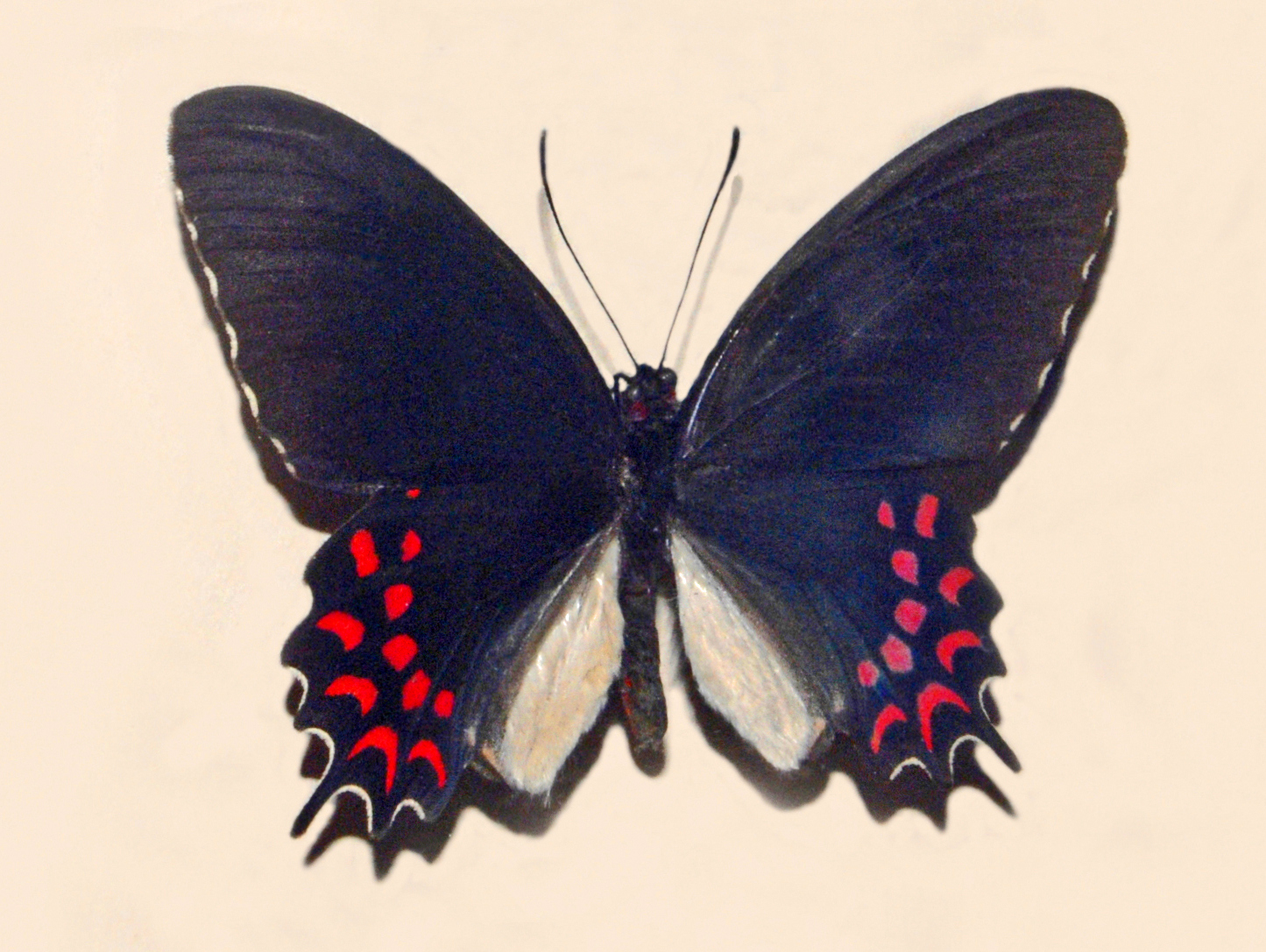
- Mounted specimen on display at Museo di Scienze Naturali Enrico Caffi, Bergamo. Dorsal view

Scientific classification
- Kingdom: Animalia
- Phylum: Arthropoda
- Clade: Pancrustacea
- Class: Insecta
- Order: Lepidoptera
- Family: Papilionidae
- Genus: Parides
- Species: P. photinus

Binomial name
- Parides photinus (Doubleday, 1844)

Synonyms
- Papilio photinus (Doubleday, 1844); Papilio dares (Hewitson, 1867); Papilio thylodilus (Ehrmann, 1921); Papilio photinus f. escalantei (C. C. Hoffman, 1940)

= Parides photinus =

Pink-spotted cattleheart

Species of butterfly

Parides photinus, the pink-spotted cattleheart, is a species of butterfly in the family Papilionidae. It was first described by Edward Doubleday in 1844.

== Description ==
Parides photinus has a wingspan reaching 90–100 millimetres (3.5–3.9 in). Adults are black with the hindwing having a blue-green metallic sheen, especially in the male. There are no wing bands. Two rows of red spots are found along the hindwing margin. The submarginal spots are strongly arched except for the upper two or three and the anal one; the latter is distinct on the upperside only in the female. The hindwings have short tails. The undersides are similar to the upsides. The larvae feed on Aristolochia grandiflora and A. asclepiadifolia. A full description is provided by Rothschild, W. and Jordan, K. (1906)

== Distribution and habitat ==
This species can be found from Mexico to Costa Rica, in Nicaragua and in Honduras. It lives in forests, where it is common to abundant. Its range extends from the sea level to 5000 feet (1500 metres).

== Gallery ==
Parides photinus from The Macrolepidoptera of the World, Jordan, K., in Seitz, A. (1907)

Parides photinus from New Species of Exotic Butterflies (1869). Plate: Papilio XI

== Taxonomy ==
Parides photinus is a member of the ascanius species group ("Fringe-spots white. Hindwing with submarginal spots and unusually also discal spots or dots, or a discal band; mostly with tail").A quadrate whitish spot in space 2 of the forewings is quite peculiar of the ascanius group

The members are:

- Parides agavus (Drury, 1782) – Agavus cattleheart
- Parides alopius (Godman & Salvin, [1890]) – white-dotted cattleheart
- Parides ascanius (Cramer, [1775]) – Fluminense swallowtail
- Parides bunichus (Hübner, [1821])
- Parides gundlachianus (C. & R. Felder, 1864) – Cuban cattleheart
- Parides montezuma (Westwood, 1842) – Montezuma's cattleheart
- Parides phalaecus (Hewitson, 1869)
- Parides photinus (Doubleday, 1844)
- Parides proneus (Hübner, [1831])
