= Amare =

Amare means "to love" in Latin. It may refer to:

== Music ==
- "Amare" (Adrijana song)
- "Amare" (Mino Vergnaghi song)
- "Amare" (La Rappresentante di Lista song)

== People ==
- Amare Adams (born 2006), American football player
- Amare Aregawi, Ethiopian journalist
- Amaré Barno (born 1999), American football player
- Amare Campbell (born 2005), American football player
- Amare Ferrell (born 2005), American football player
- Amar'e Stoudemire (born 1982), American-Israeli basketball player
- Amare Thomas (born 2005), American football player
- Girmaw Amare (born 1987), Israeli Olympic runner
- Hailemariyam Amare (born 1997), Ethiopian runner

== See also ==
- Te Amaré (disambiguation)
- Amari (disambiguation)
