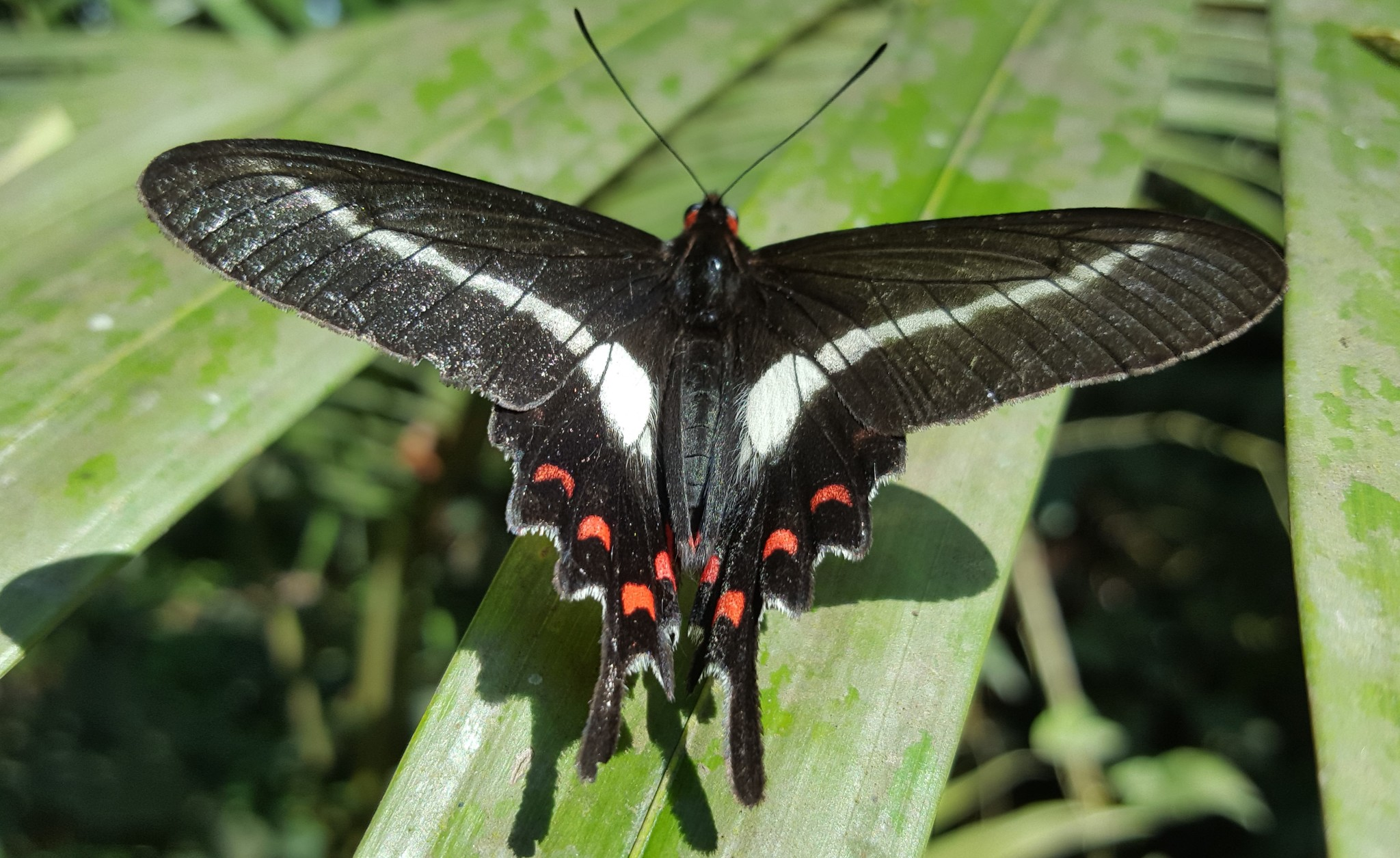
- Parides proneus observed in Brazil
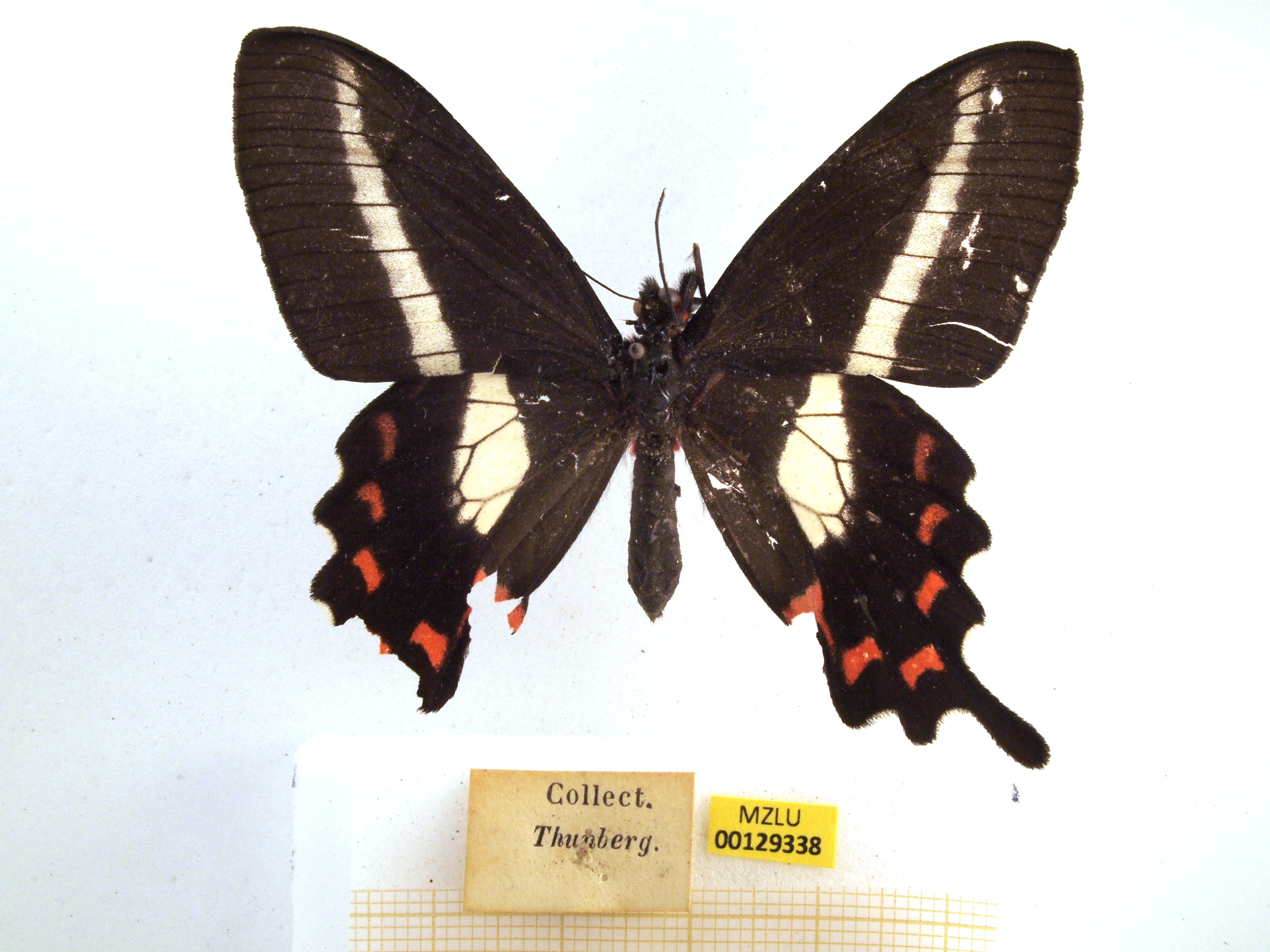
- Parides proneus MZLU

Scientific classification
- Kingdom: Animalia
- Phylum: Arthropoda
- Class: Insecta
- Order: Lepidoptera
- Family: Papilionidae
- Genus: Parides
- Species: P. proneus

Binomial name
- Parides proneus (Hübner, [1831])

Synonyms
- Hectorides proneus Hübner, [1831]; Papilio phryneus Lucas, 1852; Papilio fallax Röber, 1925

= Parides proneus =

Species of butterfly

Parides proneus is a species of butterfly in the family Papilionidae. It is found in Brazil and Paraguay.

== Description ==
Males and females:both wings with narrow white band, the red submarginal spots of the hindwing straight or slightly curved; anal spot not v-shaped. No discal spot proximal of the anal submarginal one. Width of central band and the number of spots composing it on hindwing variable. A full description is provided by Rothschild, W. and Jordan, K. (1906).

== Life cycle ==
The larva feeds on Aristolochia melastoma.

== Taxonomy ==
Parides phalaecus is a member of the ascanius species group ("Fringe-spots white. Hindwing with submarginal spots and usnally also discal spots or dots, or a discal band; a quadrate whitish spot in space 2 of the forewing; mostly with tail). A quadrate whitish spot in space 2 of the forewings is quite peculiar of the ascanius group

The members are

- Parides agavus (Drury, 1782)
- Parides alopius (Godman & Salvin, [1890])
- Parides ascanius (Cramer, [1775])
- Parides bunichus (Hübner, [1821])
- Parides gundlachianus (C. & R. Felder, 1864)
- Parides montezuma (Westwood, 1842)
- Parides phalaecus (Hewitson, 1869)
- Parides photinus (Doubleday, 1844)
- Parides proneus (Hübner, [1831])

== Status ==
A common species and not known to be threatened.
