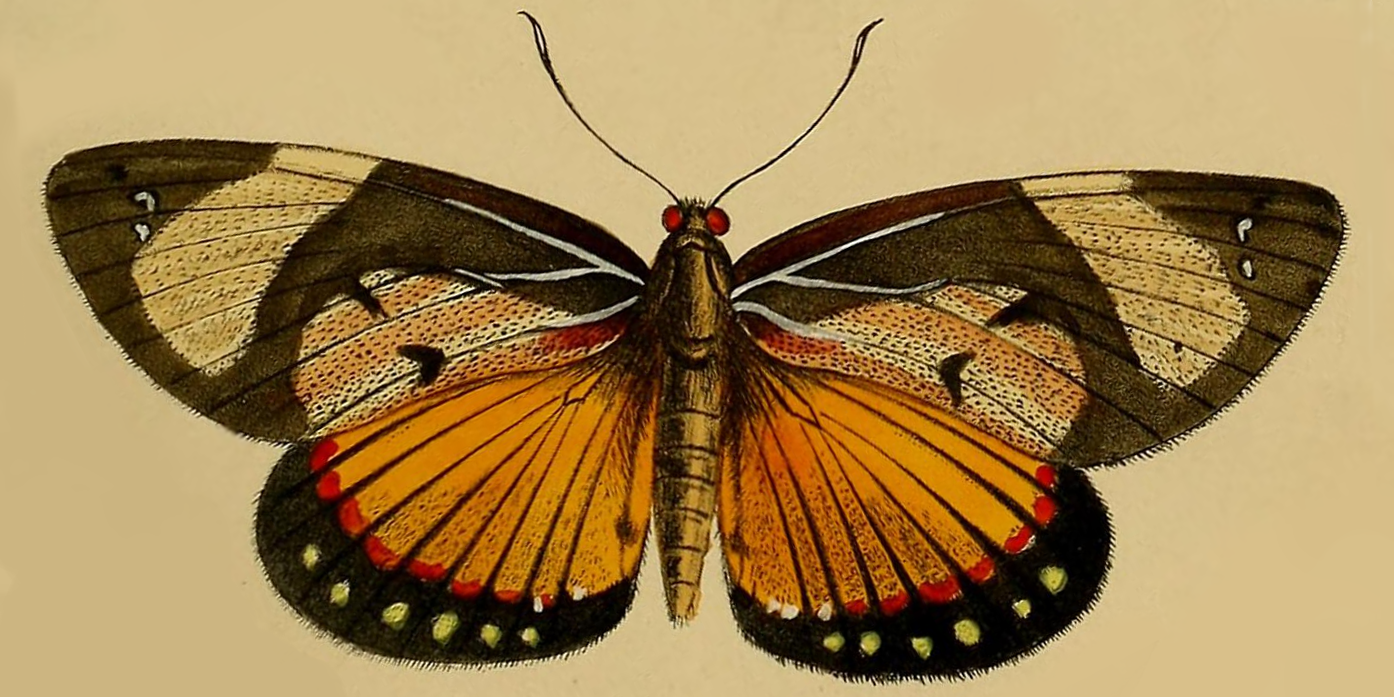

Scientific classification
- Domain: Eukaryota
- Kingdom: Animalia
- Phylum: Arthropoda
- Class: Insecta
- Order: Lepidoptera
- Family: Castniidae
- Genus: Imara
- Species: I. satrapes

Binomial name
- Imara satrapes (Kollar, 1839)

Synonyms
- Castnia satrapes Kollar, 1839; Castnia catharina Preiss, 1899; Castnia satrapes f. aberrans Strand, 1913; Castnia satrapes f. rufimaculata Strand, 1913; Castnia satrapes f. sapucaya Jörgensen, 1930; Castnia satrapes insolita Schweizer & Kay, 1941; Imara satrapes catharina (Preiss, 1899)

= Imara satrapes =

Species of moth

Imara satrapes is a moth in the Castniidae family. It is found in Brazil, Paraguay and Uruguay.

The wingspan is about 75 mm.

== Subspecies ==
Imara satrapes catharina (Preiss, 1899) from Brazil, Paraguay and Uruguay was formerly considered a distinct subspecies, but was placed as a synonym of Imara satrapes in 2011.
