= Imri =

Imri or Imry may refer to:

== In the Hebrew Bible ==
- Imri (biblical figure), two individuals mentioned in the Old Testament

== Other ==
- Imri Ganiel (born 1992), Israeli swimmer
- Imri Kalmann (born 1986), Israeli social activist and former co-chairperson of the Israeli LGBT Association
- Imri Ziv, also known as IMRI, Israeli singer and voice actor. After winning HaKokhav HaBa, he represented Israel in the Eurovision Song Contest 2017 in Kiev
- Yoseph Imry (1939–2018), Israeli physicist

== See also ==
- IMRIS
