= Imara analibiae =

Scientific classification
- Kingdom: Animalia
- Phylum: Arthropoda
- Clade: Pancrustacea
- Class: Insecta
- Order: Lepidoptera
- Family: Castniidae
- Genus: Imara
- Species: I. analibiae

Binomial name
- Imara analibiae Espinoza & González, 2005

Species of moth

Imara analibiae is a moth in the Castniidae family. It is found in the forest of the Estación Biológica La Selva, near Puerto Viejo, Sarapiquí, Heredia Province in Costa Rica. The habitat consists of a mosaic of mature lowland forest, secondary growth forest of various ages and abandoned pastures.

The length of the forewings is about 45 mm for males and 59 mm for females.
