= Parides phalaecus =

- Illustration accompanying the original description in Hewitson's Illustrations of New Species of Exotic Butterflies of 1869

Conservation status
- Vulnerable (IUCN 3.1)

Scientific classification
- Kingdom: Animalia
- Phylum: Arthropoda
- Clade: Pancrustacea
- Class: Insecta
- Order: Lepidoptera
- Family: Papilionidae
- Genus: Parides
- Species: P. phalaecus

Binomial name
- Parides phalaecus (Hewitson, 1869)

Synonyms
- Papilio phalaecus Hewitson, 1869

Species of butterfly

Parides phaleucas is a species of butterfly in the family Papilionidae. It was described by William Chapman Hewitson in 1869. It is found in Ecuador and Peru.

== Description ==
Parides phalaecus has a spatulate tail. The body is very hairy and the white band, which traverses both wings, is intersected by black veins. "A white band from costal margin of forewing to anal angle of hindwing, parallel to distal margin of forewing, shaded with black scaling on forewing and distally on hindwing, interrupted by the black veins; the band close to cell on both wings, wider in female than in male; female with white spot in cell of forewing; a row of red submarginal spots on hind wing, densely shaded with black on upperside, especially in male". A full description is provided by Rothschild, W. and Jordan, K. (1906)

== Subspecies ==
There are two subspecies.

- P. p. phalaecus Ecuador
- P. p. nieva Möhn, 1999 in Butterflies of the World 8: 1, pl. 1, f. 1-4, type locality: Rio Nieva, 2500–3000 m, Amazonas, northern Peru.

== Biology ==
The larva feeds on Aristolochia weberbaueri

== Taxonomy ==
Parides phalaecus is a member of the ascanius species group ("Fringe-spots white. Hindwing with submarginal spots and usually also discal spots or dots, or a discal band; mostly with tail".) A quadrate whitish spot in space 2 of the forewings is quite peculiar of the ascanius group.

The members are

- Parides agavus (Drury, 1782)
- Parides alopius (Godman & Salvin, [1890])
- Parides ascanius (Cramer, [1775])
- Parides bunichus (Hübner, [1821])
- Parides gundlachianus (C. & R. Felder, 1864)
- Parides montezuma (Westwood, 1842)
- Parides phalaecus (Hewitson, 1869)
- Parides photinus (Doubleday, 1844)
- Parides proneus (Hübner, [1831])
