= Imara =

Imara may refer to:

== People ==
- Imara Esteves Ribalta (born 1978), Cuban beach volleyball player
- Imara Reis (born 1948), Brazilian stage, television and film actress
- Nia Imara, American astrophysicist and artist

== Other uses ==
- Imara, Estonia, village in Estonia
- Imara (moth), a genus of moths within the family Castniidae
- Argentine Marines, abbreviated as IMARA

== See also ==
- Al-Imara, Palestinian village
