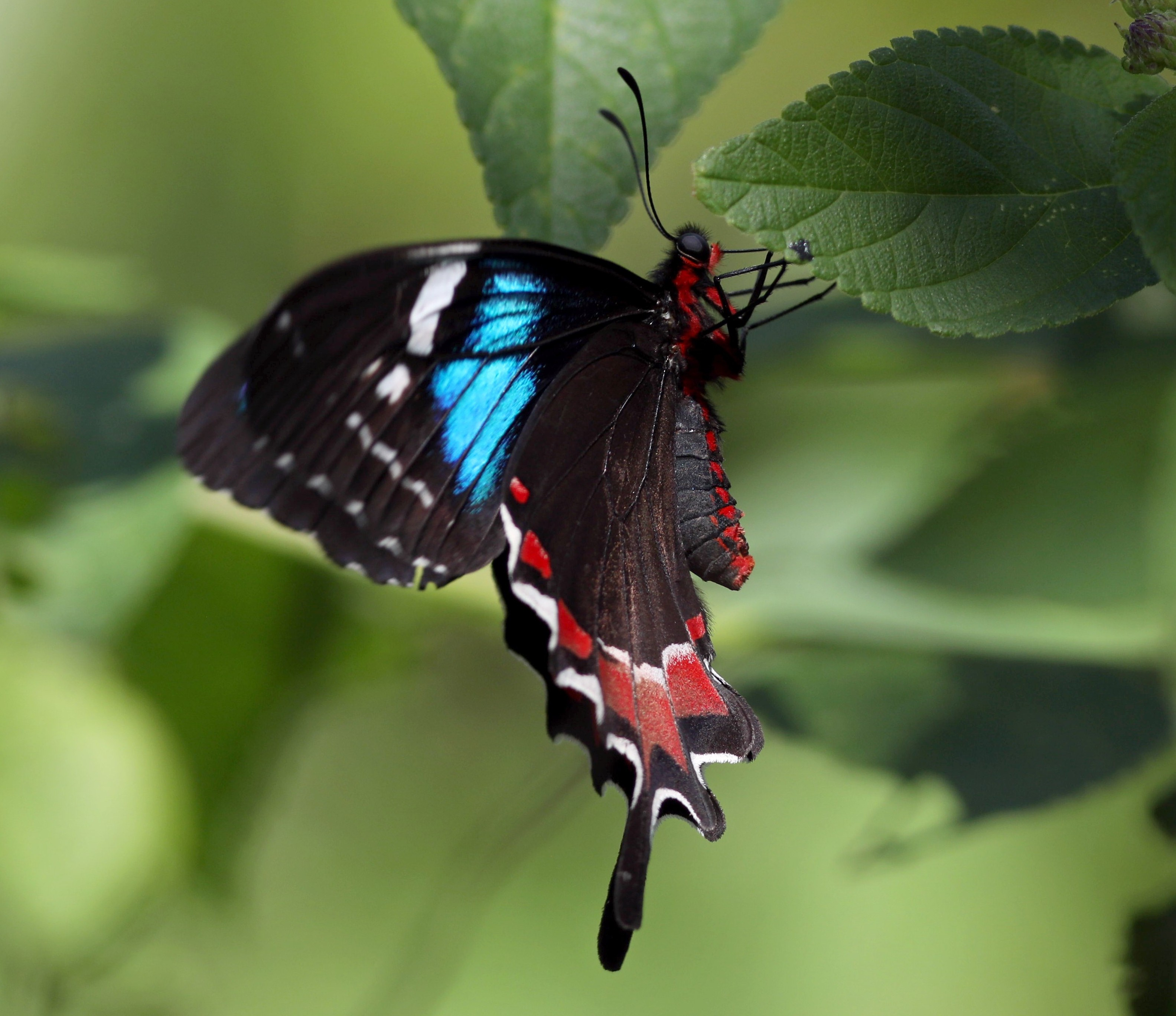

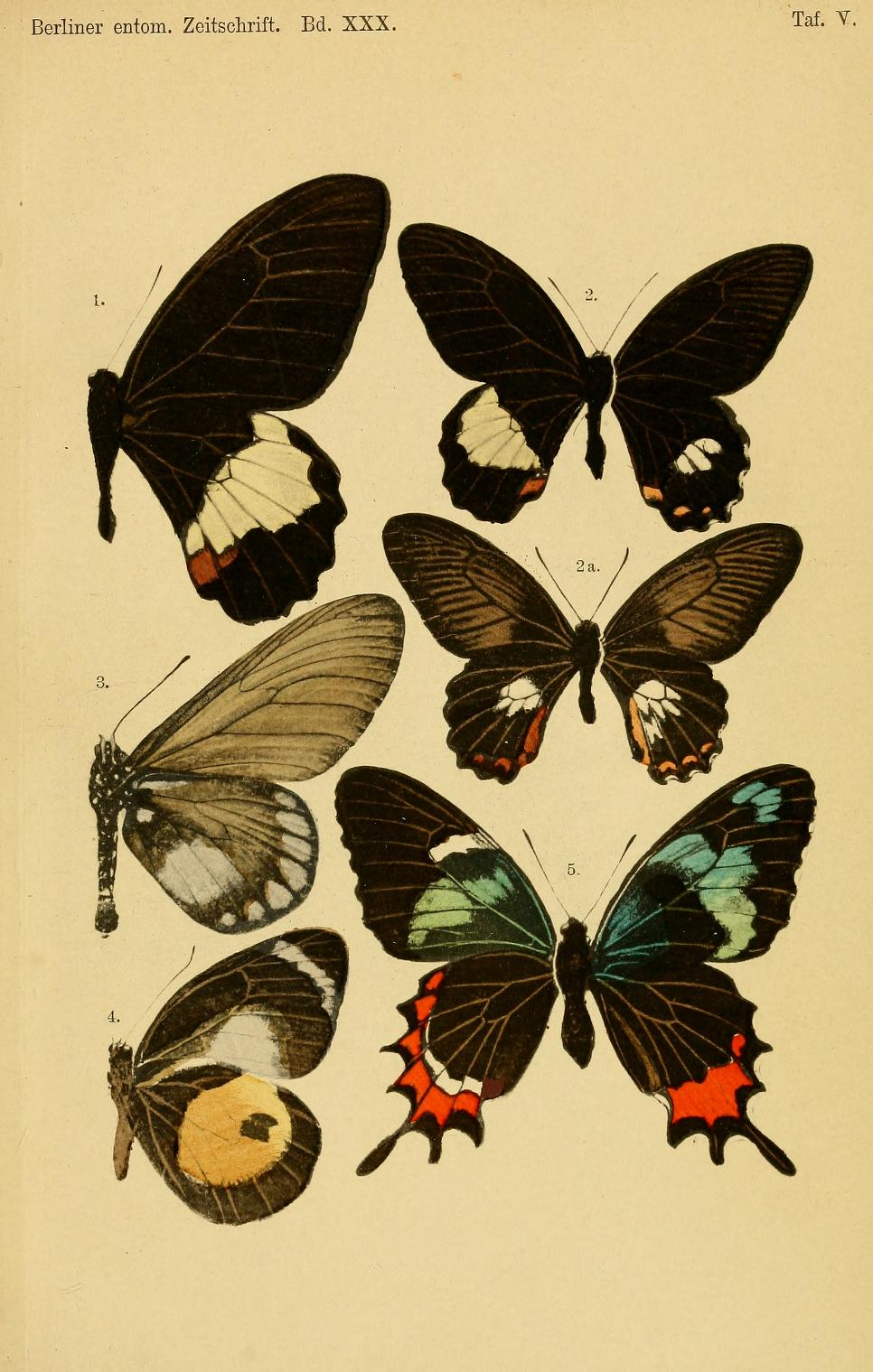
- in Honrath, 1886 Neue Rhopalocera Berl. ent. Z. figure 5 bottom right

Conservation status
- Near Threatened (IUCN 3.1)

Scientific classification
- Kingdom: Animalia
- Phylum: Arthropoda
- Clade: Pancrustacea
- Class: Insecta
- Order: Lepidoptera
- Family: Papilionidae
- Genus: Parides
- Species: P. gundlachianus

Binomial name
- Parides gundlachianus (C. & R. Felder, 1864)

Synonyms
- Papilio gundlachianus C. & R. Felder, 1864; Papilio columbus Herrich-Schäffer, 1862; Papilio grotei Blake, 1865; Papilio gundlachianus f. unipunctus Rousseau-Decelle, 1943; Papilio gundlachianus f. pauperimus Rousseau-Decelle, 1943; Battus gundlachianus var. calzadillae Torre, 1971

= Parides gundlachianus =

Cuban cattleheart

Species of butterfly

Parides gundlachianus, the Cuban cattleheart, is a species of butterfly in the family Papilionidae. It is an endemic species found only in Cuba. The name honours the Cuban naturalist Juan Gundlach.

It is the brightest-coloured American swallowtail, and may be recognised by the brilliant blue bands on the forewing. The ground colour is brown to black. The upperside forewing has a blue to green median band and possibly one to two spots close to the apex. The hindwings have a long tail and on either side two indentations like short tails. The upperside hindwing has a broad red submarginal band. The underside (verso) is brown The wingspan is 7–8 cm A full description is provided by Rothschild, W. and Jordan, K. (1906)

The dark ash-grey larva is striped longitudinally, the head and thoracic legs are black; the black longitudinal stripes in part margined with white; the anterior and posterior segments bear long pointed tubercles which are partly white.

Occurs in the mountainous eastern part of the island, especially near the coast, where it is met with on flowers, and sometimes also drinking at pools. The host plants of its caterpillar are Aristolochia

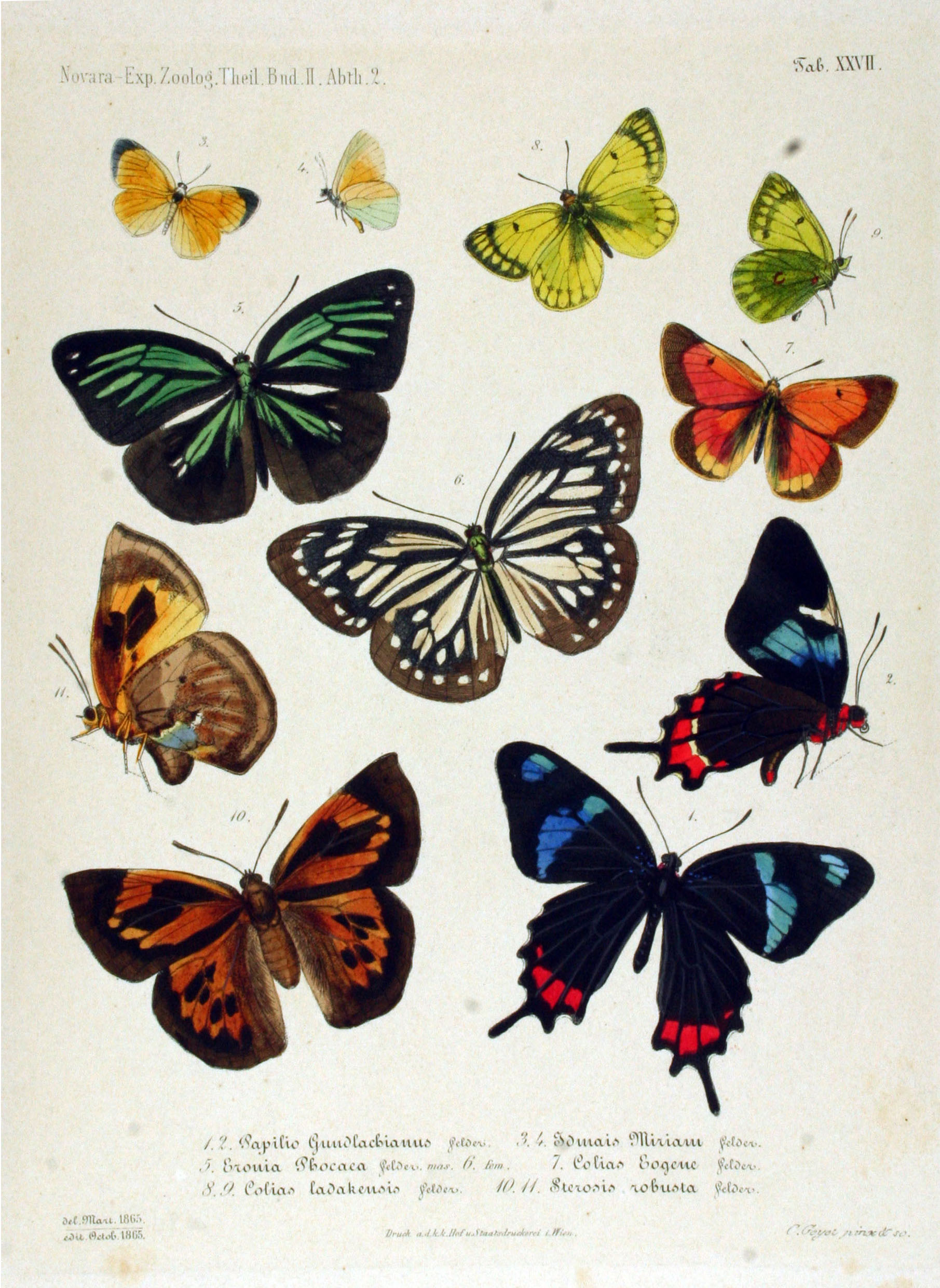
''Parides gundlachianus'' in a plate from ''Reise der Österreichischen Fregatte Novara'' - at bottom right

== Subspecies ==
- Parides gundlachianus gundlachianus (eastern Cuba)
- Parides gundlachianus alayoi Hernández, Alayón & Smith, 1995 (western Cuba)

== Taxonomy ==
Parides gundlachianus is a member of the ascanius species group ("Fringe-spots white. Hindwing with submarginal spots and usnally also diseal spots or dots, or a discal band; mostly with tail") A quadrate whitish spot in space 2 of the forewings is quite peculiar of the ascanius group

The members are

- Parides agavus (Drury, 1782)
- Parides alopius (Godman & Salvin, [1890])
- Parides ascanius (Cramer, [1775])
- Parides bunichus (Hübner, [1821])
- Parides gundlachianus (C. & R. Felder, 1864)
- Parides montezuma (Westwood, 1842)
- Parides phalaecus (Hewitson, 1869)
- Parides photinus (Doubleday, 1844)
- Parides proneus (Hübner, [1831])

== Status ==
Found only in forests in Cuba and not rare but requiring monitoring.

== Etymology ==
The specific epithet honours the Cuban naturalist Juan Gundlach.

== See also ==
- List of Lepidoptera of Cuba
