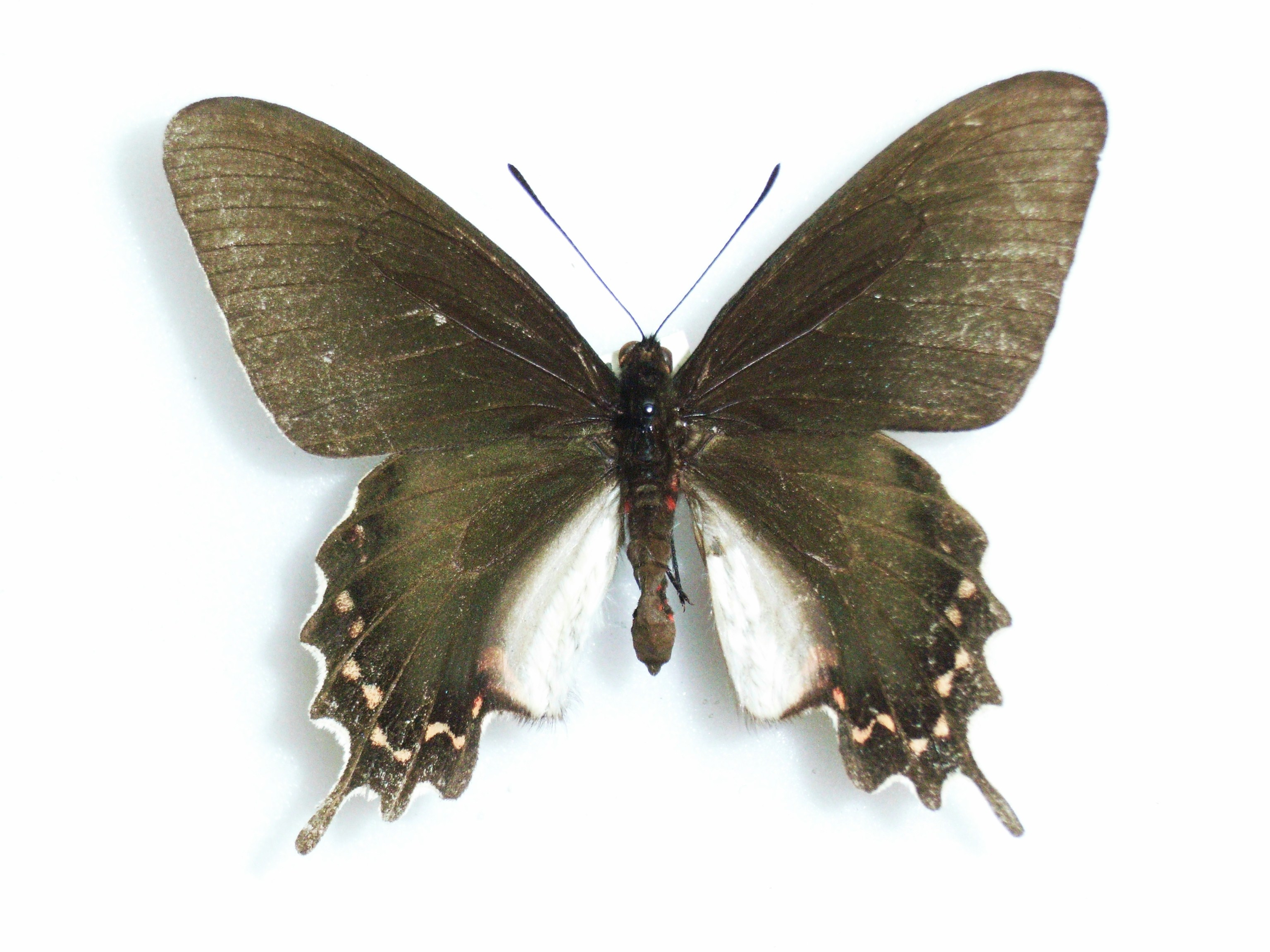
- P. b. damocrates, male
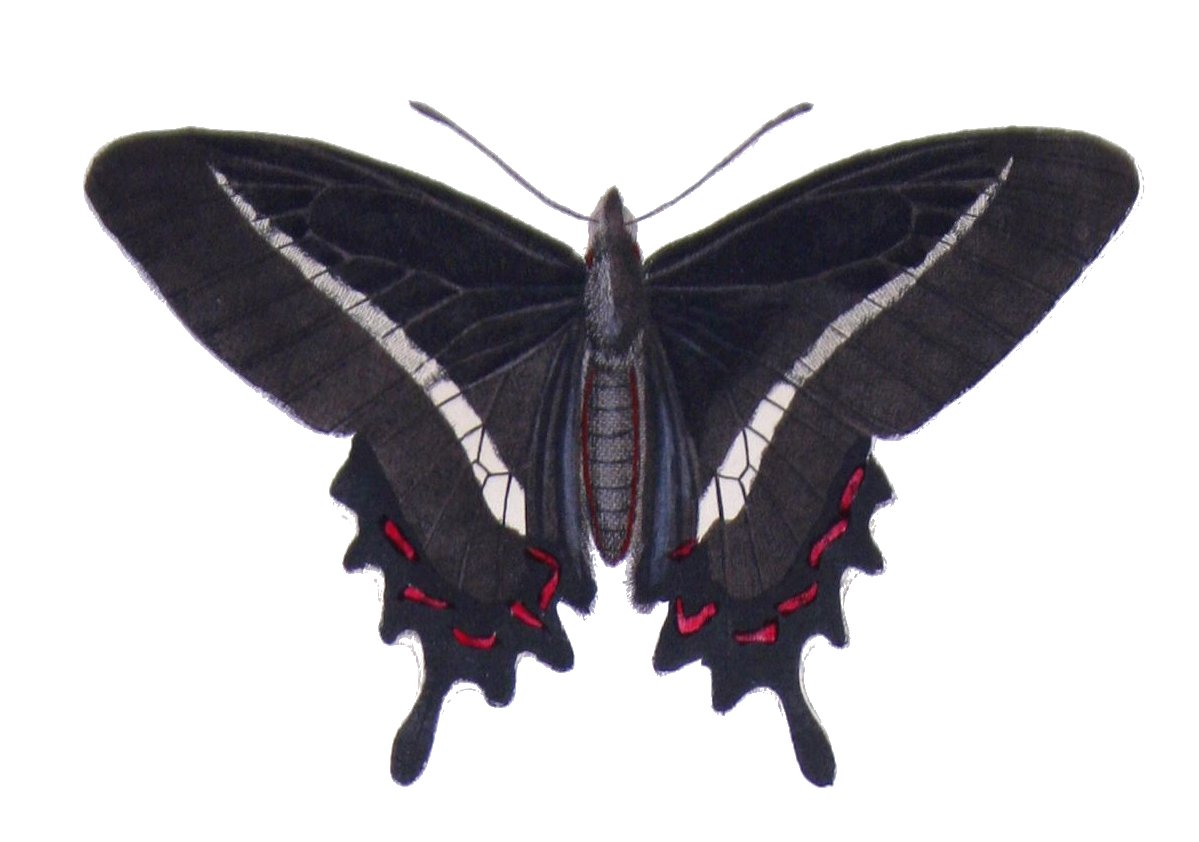
- P. b. chamissonia

Scientific classification
- Kingdom: Animalia
- Phylum: Arthropoda
- Clade: Pancrustacea
- Class: Insecta
- Order: Lepidoptera
- Family: Papilionidae
- Genus: Parides
- Species: P. bunichus

Binomial name
- Parides bunichus (Hübner, [1821])

Synonyms
- Menelaides bunichus Hübner, [1821]; Papilio ascalus Godart, [1924]; Papilio chamissonia Eschscholtz, 1821; Papilio echedorus Boisduval, 1836; Papilio eurydorus Lucas, 1852; Papilio archimides Larrañaga, 1923; Papilio campeiro Foetterle, 1902; Parides chamissonia; Parides diodorus; Papilio perrhebus Boisduval, 1836; Parides perrhebus

= Parides bunichus =

Species of butterfly

Parides bunichus is a butterfly of the family Papilionidae. It is found in Brazil, Paraguay, Argentina and Uruguay.

The larva is brownish black, with an oblique white band, extending laterally from the 6th segment to the tubercle on the 7th. The pupal stage lasts three weeks.

The butterfly is very common and is one of the earliest spring species (August). From August to April there are at least three generations.

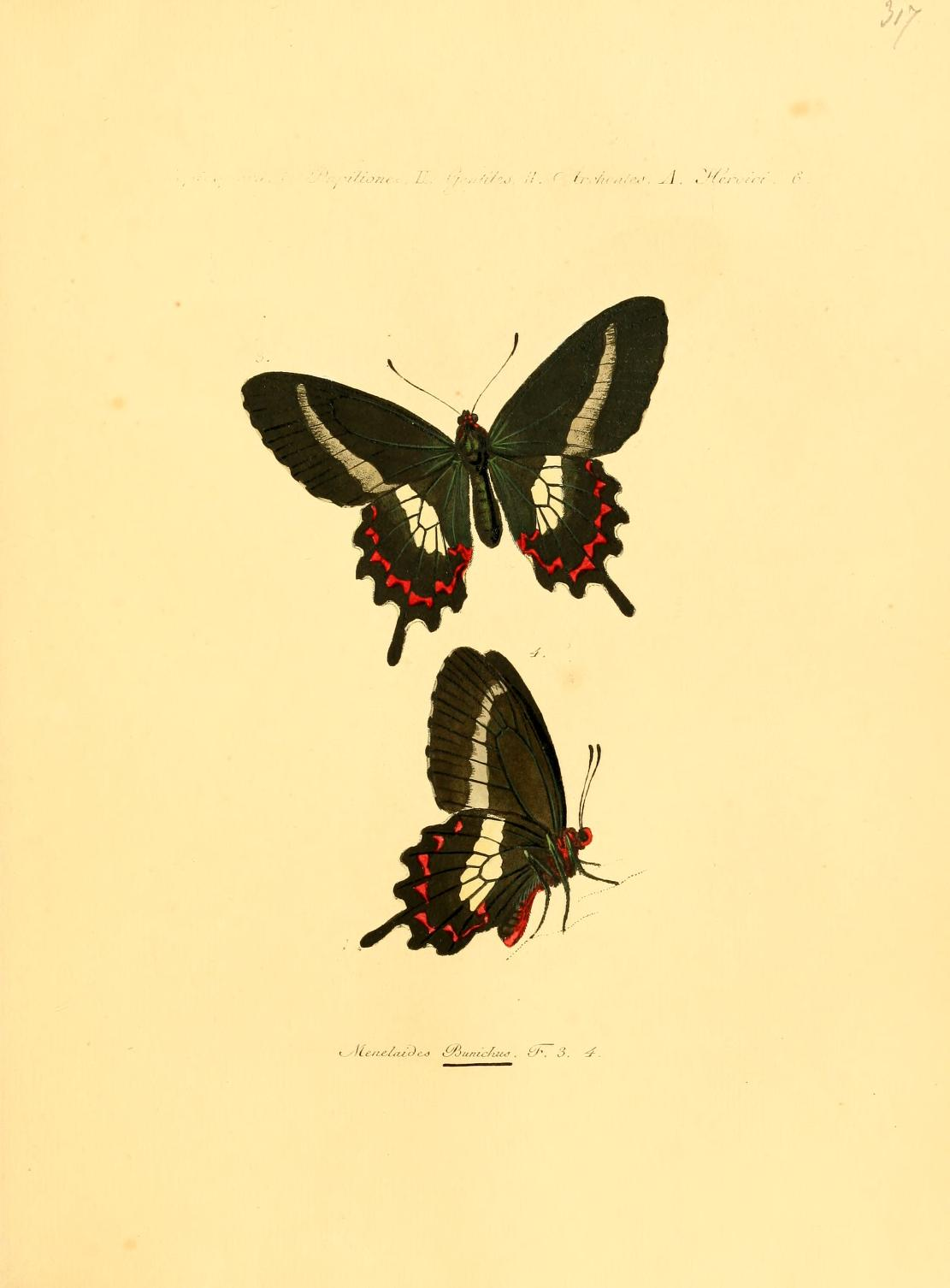
P. b. bunichus

== Subspecies ==
- P. b. bunichus (Brazil: Santa Catarina, São Paulo, Rio de Janeiro, Paraná, Santa Catarina)
- P. b. chamissonia (Eschscholtz, 1821) (Brazil: Santa Catarina) Both wings with white band, that on the hindwing abbreviated; cell-spot of the hindwing not extending further towards the base than to the second median; red anal spot v-shaped. In forma echedorus Boisduval the fringes are partly black, at least at the extremities of the veins.
- P. b. damocrates (Guenée, 1872) (Argentina, Uruguay) Much paler; the head and palpi are black, and the submarginal spots on the upper surface of the hindwing are not bright red.
- P. b. diodorus (Hopffer, 1863) (Brazil: Goias, Bahia, Minas Gerais) Has entirely white fringes. The breadth of the white band is variable.
- P. b. perrhebus (Boisduval, 1836) (Paraguay, Brazil (São Paulo, Paraná, Santa Catarina, Rio Grande do Sul), northern Argentina)

== Status ==
Parides bunichus is common and not threatened.

== Taxonomy ==
Parides bunichus is a member of the ascanius species group ("Fringe-spots white. Hindwing with submarginal spots and usnally also discal spots or dots, or a discal band; mostly with tail") A quadrate whitish spot in space 2 of the forewings is quite peculiar of the ascanius group

The members are

- Parides agavus (Drury, 1782)
- Parides alopius (Godman & Salvin, [1890])
- Parides ascanius (Cramer, [1775])
- Parides bunichus (Hübner, [1821])
- Parides gundlachianus (C. & R. Felder, 1864)
- Parides montezuma (Westwood, 1842)
- Parides phalaecus (Hewitson, 1869)
- Parides photinus (Doubleday, 1844)
- Parides proneus (Hübner, [1831])
