= Te Amaré =

Te Amaré may refer to:

- "Te Amaré" (Gloria Estefan song), a 2003 song by Gloria Estefan
- "Te Amaré" (The Barrio Boyzz song), a 1994 song, also covered by Marc Anthony
- "Te Amaré", a 2008 song by R.K.M. & Ken-Y from the album The Royalty: La Realeza
- "Te Amaré", a 2010 song by Huey Dunbar
