= Amari (group) =

American band

Amari was an R&B group who were signed to Tommy Boy Records in the 1990s featuring members Sneezy, Sherri and Pooh. They released the song "Get Down With Me" which featured Buckshot of hip-hop group Black Moon on the Nothing to Lose soundtrack. They released their debut album Sunshine on July 21, 1998. Their debut single "Callin'" was released in 1998, it was featured on the Ride soundtrack, Billboard magazine noted the track as one of the years "New & Northworthy" tracks, eventually peaking on the R&B charts.
