= Dashen Brewery Share Company Ltd =

Ethiopian brewing company

- Type: Joint-stock
- Industry: Brewery
- Founded: 2000
- Headquarters: Gondar, Amhara Region, Ethiopia
- Owner: Vasari Global; TIRET Group
- Number of employees: 600+

Dashen Brewery Share Company Ltd is an Ethiopian brewing company established in 2000 in Gondar, Amhara Region. With initial capital of 340 million birr, Dashen Brewery produces Dashen Beer, a royal beer, and draught beer, and played major role in Ethiopian brewing industry. It is owned by British firm Vasari Global (Vasari) and TIRET Group (TIRET).

== History ==
Dashen Brewery Share Company Ltd was founded in 2000 in Gondar with initial capital investment of 340 million birr. Owned by British firm Vasari Global (Vasari) and TIRET Group (TIRET), it produces Dashen Beer, royal beer, and draught beer. With annual production capacity of 500,000 hectoliters and over 600 employees, it played major rapid development in beer market in Ethiopia. The company aims to reduce wates, increases customer appeal, and maintain environmental hazards throughout operation. It also aims to expand its branch both internationally and domestically. In 2022, the company announced plant expansion in Gondar and Debre Birhan with 1.7 billion birr expenditure.
