= Amari Masatada =

Japanese samurai of the Sengoku period of Feudal Japan

Amari Masatada (甘利 昌忠, 1543–1564) was a Japanese samurai of the Sengoku period of Feudal Japan. The son and successor of Amari Torayasu, he was a senior retainer of the Takeda clan of Kai Province, and ranked among Takeda Shingen's 'Twenty-four Generals'. Masatada also served as one of Shingen's personal attendants. During Shingen's campaign in Shinano Province, Masatada served with distinction at the Battle of Kawanakajima in 1561. Masatada later fought at the Battle of Mikatagahara as a senior Takeda officer. By the year of 1563 Masatada went on to fight at the Battle of Usuigatoge and Musashi Matsuyama, but was killed a year later in what would be defined as rare for any standard samurai: a horse riding accident. There is one incident which gave Masatada a stronger name for himself despite being rather eccentric in nature: when Masatada had confronted one of his wounded retainers who suffered from physical bleeding that would not cease flowing, he advised him to drink horse feces and water to support the clotting of his blood — considered among Japanese culture as a folklore. The man was expectingly hesitant in doing so, but when Masatada himself consumed some of the concoction, he was encouraged to follow suit and reportedly recovered.
