= Imri Kalmann =

Israeli social activist

- אימרי קלמן
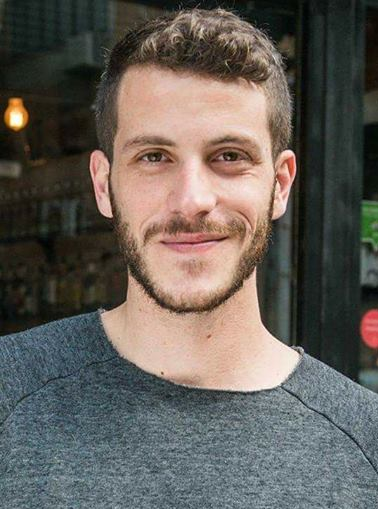
- Born: June 17, 1986 (age 39); Haifa, Israel

Imri Kalmann (Hebrew: אימרי קלמן; born June 17, 1986) is a social activist and former co-chairperson of the Israeli LGBT Association. He is an entrepreneur and a Tel Aviv nightlife personality who has opened several successful clubs in the city.

TheMarker magazine chose Kalmann as one of 40 most promising young people of 2015, for his political and nightlife activities, and in 2016, he was chosen by the website Mako as one of the most influential people in the gay community in Israel.

== Early life ==
Kalmann was born in Haifa and is the youngest son of Dov Kalmann and Sylvia Cohen, immigrants from the Netherlands. At an early age, he moved with his family to Kfar Saba. His parents divorced when he was eight years old, and later, his father came out of the closet, after his grandfather came out of the closet before that.

He served in the IDF for five years, during which he served as an adjutant in the Armored Corps, as team commander of corps officer completion courses, and as a human resource development officer for the navy's submarine project.

== Public Activity ==
In August, 2009, Kalmann joined the ranks of the Israel Gay Youth (IGY), where he volunteered for five years. He served as a youth counselor for youth groups and as the educational coordinator for the Sharon district counselors.

In 2012 and 2013, Kalmann was chosen to lead the Tel Aviv gay pride parade campaign. As the campaign designer, he created the image "It's Worth Being Proud" ("Let it B") in which the leaders of the gay community in Israel participated.

In 2015, Kalmann was elected co-chairperson of the LGBT Association, together with Chen Arieli, who is currently serving as the organization's chairperson. At that time, the association led organizational changes and collaborations with other gay organizations in Israel. The association grew tenfold in number of members and increased the community's organizational budget from 1.5 million shekels a year, to 11 million shekels. He decided not to allow Education Minister Naftali Bennett to speak at the memorial ceremony for Shira Banki and the murder victims at the gay center Bar-Noar, because of the minister's refusal to sign a statement of commitment to the rights of the community.

Kalmann and Arieli initiated a special day in the Knesset devoted to the rights of the gay community in Israel, They also led a protest against the homophobic remarks by Rabbi Yigal Levinstein, which led to the Ministry of Defense prohibiting his entry to IDF bases, a petition to the Supreme Court of Israel for gay marriage, petition to the high court for equality in registering children of female couples, and a struggle that led to the Ministry of Health and Magen David Adom decision allowing homosexuals and bisexuals to donate blood.

In the run-up to the twentieth Knesset elections, Kalmann was elected to the 17th place by Meretz on the party's Knesset list. In 2017, he announced his entry into politics and his integration into the leadership of the Meretz party. He was later elected chairperson of the Tel-Aviv branch and declared his candidacy for party chairperson.
