= Amare Aregawi =

Ethiopian journalist

- ኣማረ ኣረጋዊ
- Occupations: Journalist, media proprietor
- Known for: Owner of Media & Communications Centre, Editor in Chief of Ethiopian Reporter, Co-owner of Arts TV

Amare Aregawi (Tigrinya: ኣማረ ኣረጋዊ) is an Ethiopian journalist and the founder of Media & Communications Center, which publishes The Reporter (Ethiopia), an Amharic and English newspaper headquartered in Addis Ababa, Ethiopia. He is the editor-in-chief of the bilingual newspaper and co-owner of the Ethiopian TV network ARTS TV.

== Journalism career ==
Aregawi was previously in charge of Ethiopia's only public television network, EBC (formerly ETV) following the fall of the Derg dictatorship in 1991.

In 2008 he was arrested in connection with an article about labor practices that criticized Dashen Brewery, a local beer brand. The brewery filed a defamation suit against the newspaper which led to the arrest of Aregawi on 22 August 2008. He was released shortly thereafter on bail.

Reporters Without Borders condemned the arrest and issued a statement saying "Amare's unjustified arrest exposes the unfairness of legislation that allows journalists to be imprisoned for defamation". Shortly after his arrest, and following a series of editorials criticizing the business community, Aregawi was assaulted and left unconscious following a parent-teacher meeting at his son's school. The International Press Institute connected the attack to his reporting and called on the government to "do everything in their power to ensure that Ethiopian journalists are free to carry out their profession without fear of attack".
