= Ethiopian Media Council =

Self-regulatory body for the media industry in Ethiopia

- Abbreviation: EMC
- Formation: 2016
- Type: Media self-regulatory body
- Purpose: Media self-regulation and press freedom
- Headquarters: Addis Ababa, Ethiopia
- Region served: Ethiopia
- Members: 52 member media houses and associations

The Ethiopian Media Council (EMC) is a voluntary, self-regulatory body for the media industry in Ethiopia. It serves as organisation for media outlets, community media and journalists, and operates a complaints mechanism on questions of media ethics, fairness and accuracy. It was created in 2016 and officially registered in 2019.

== Organisation ==
The council's membership comprises publishers, broadcasters and media associations, reported at around 52 member organisations. It is structured into a general assembly, an executive committee and a judicial body, the Press Ombudsman and Complaint Commission, whose members are drawn from media organisations and the public. The council states that it receives no government funding. As of the mid-2020s it was chaired by Amare Aregawi, a journalist and founder of the Media and Communication Center.

== Role ==
The EMC promotes professional and ethical journalism and advocates for press freedom, and is distinct from the Ethiopian Media Authority, the statutory government regulator. The council's self-regulatory role was recognised in Ethiopia's 2021 media law. When the government proposed amendments to the media law in 2024 and 2025 that would shift powers from the Media Authority's board to its director-general and the prime minister, the EMC was among the bodies that publicly opposed the changes, warning that they would open the door to political interference and weaken independent oversight of the press.
