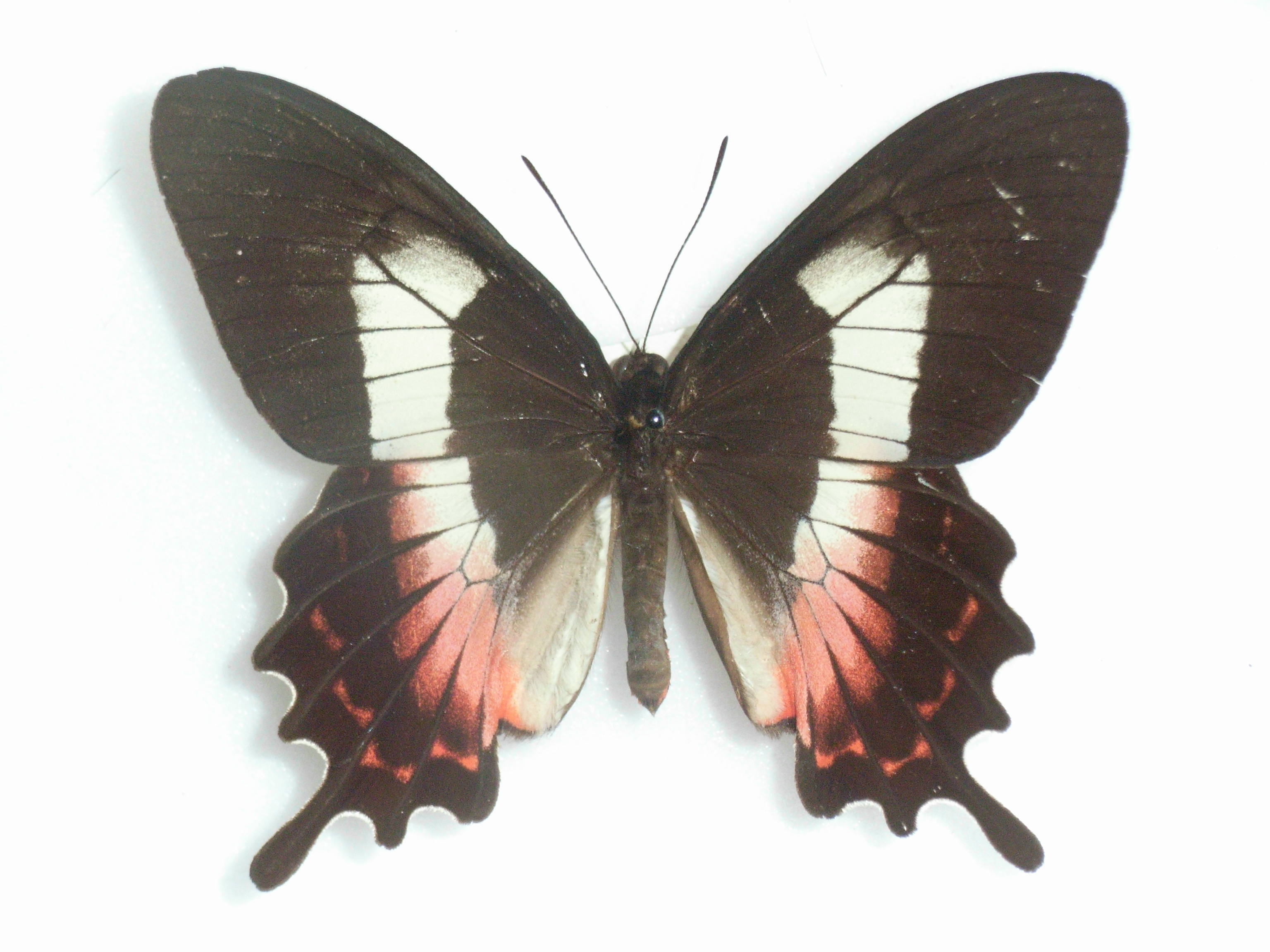

Conservation status
- Vulnerable (IUCN 3.1)

Scientific classification
- Kingdom: Animalia
- Phylum: Arthropoda
- Clade: Pancrustacea
- Class: Insecta
- Order: Lepidoptera
- Family: Papilionidae
- Genus: Parides
- Species: P. ascanius

Binomial name
- Parides ascanius (Cramer, 1775)

= Parides ascanius =

Fluminense swallowtail

Species of butterfly

Parides ascanius, the Fluminense swallowtail, is a species of butterfly in the family Papilionidae. It is endemic to Brazil where it is confined to the municipalities of Atafona (São João da Barra) and Itaguaí.It is found in subcoastal swamps and thickets ('restinga'). It is a said to be a primitive species, lacking vigour and facing competition from the sympatric Parides zacynthus and Parides anchises nephalion, the two most advanced members of the genus, both strong and aggressive species. Most of its habitat is threatened and the localities in which it occurs are scattered. A strikingly beautiful butterfly it is on the Brazilian list of animals threatened with extinction, the first insect so designated.

== Description ==
Parides ascanius has a spatulate tail. The two sexes are similar. The male has on the hindwing a hindmarginal fold, covered with white wool (androconial fold. A broad white median band traverses both wings which have black ground colour; on the hindwing this is more or less rose red.The hindwing has a deeply scalloped outer margin, a relatively long tail, and an extension of the median band of the forewing to the inner margin. This wing is washed with rose coloured scales, especially anally, and there is also a row of red, hourglass-shaped submarginal spots. The larva is light brown, and bears pointed tubercles on all the segments. A full description is provided by Rothschild, W. and Jordan, K. (1906)

== Biology ==
Parides ascanius larvae are found from October to April, feeding only on Aristolochia macroura in its preferred wetland habitats. Adults fly all year. The favourite flower of the nectar feeding adults is Lantana camara (Verbenaceae)

== Taxonomy ==
Parides ascanius is the type member of the ascanius species group

The members are

- Parides agavus (Drury, 1782)
- Parides alopius (Godman & Salvin, [1890])
- Parides ascanius (Cramer, [1775])
- Parides bunichus (Hübner, [1821])
- Parides gundlachianus (C. & R. Felder, 1864)
- Parides montezuma (Westwood, 1842)
- Parides phalaecus (Hewitson, 1869)
- Parides photinus (Doubleday, 1844)
- Parides proneus (Hübner, [1831])

== Etymology ==
It is named in the classical tradition. In Roman mythology Ascanius is a legendary king. The common name, "Fluminense", is the demonym for residents of the state of Rio de Janeiro, Brazil.

== Sources ==
- Gimenez Dixon, M. (1996). "Parides ascanius". IUCN Red List of Threatened Species. 1996 e.T16239A5584675. doi:10.2305/IUCN.UK.1996.RLTS.T16239A5584675.en.
