= Imara (moth) =

Scientific classification
- Domain: Eukaryota
- Kingdom: Animalia
- Phylum: Arthropoda
- Class: Insecta
- Order: Lepidoptera
- Family: Castniidae
- Genus: Imara; Houlbert, 1918

Genus of moths

Imara is a genus of moths within the family Castniidae.

== Species ==
- Imara analibiae Espinoza & González, 2005
- Imara pallasia (Eschscholtz, 1821)
- Imara satrapes (Kollar, 1839)
