= Amari, Nepal =

Place in Nepal

Amari आमरी
- Village development committee
- Location in Nepal Amari (Asia)
- Coordinates: 27°26′51″N 83°14′31″E
- Country: Nepal
- Province: Lumbini Province
- District: Rupandehi District

Population (1991)
  - Total: 3,655
- Time zone: UTC+5:45 (Nepal Time)

Amari is a village development committee in Rupandehi District in Lumbini Province of southern Nepal. At the time of the 1991 Nepal census it had a population of 3655 people living in 529 individual households.
