= Imar (disambiguation) =

Imar or IMAR may refer to:

- Emar, an ancient Amorite city located in modern-day Syria
- Ímar, a 9th-century Norse king
- Ímar (band), a musical group from the British Isles
- Ímar of Limerick, Viking ruler
- Imar the Servitor, 1914 American film
- Inner Mongolia Autonomous Region of China
- Institute of Mathematics of the Romanian Academy (IMAR), in Bucharest, Romania
