= Amari Torayasu =

- 甘利 虎泰
- Born: 1498
- Died: 23 March 1548 (aged 49–50); Uedahara, Shinano, Japan
- Children: Amari Masatada
- Relatives: Akira Amari (descendant)
- Military career
- Allegiance: Takeda clan
- Known for: One of the Twenty-Four Generals
- Conflicts: Battle of Uedahara †

Amari Torayasu (甘利 虎泰; 1498 – March 23, 1548) was a Japanese samurai of the Sengoku period who served the Takeda clan under Takeda Nobutora and Shingen. Amari was a shukurō, or clan elder, following Shingen's accession to family headship, and was one of "Twenty-Four Generals of Takeda Shingen".

Amari was killed in action at the battle of Uedahara in 1548, together with Itagaki Nobukata. The two were fighting side by side when suddenly a volley of arrows shot them down.

Amari was succeeded by his son Amari Masatada.

Japanese Politician Akira Amari is a descendant of Torayasu.

== Amari in Fiction ==
In NHK's 2007 Taiga drama Fūrinkazan, Amari is played by Raita Ryū.
