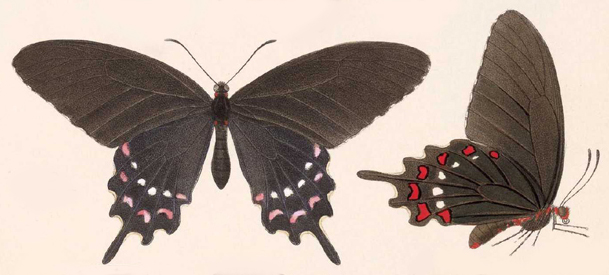

Scientific classification
- Kingdom: Animalia
- Phylum: Arthropoda
- Class: Insecta
- Order: Lepidoptera
- Family: Papilionidae
- Genus: Parides
- Species: P. alopius

Binomial name
- Parides alopius (Godman & Salvin, 1890)
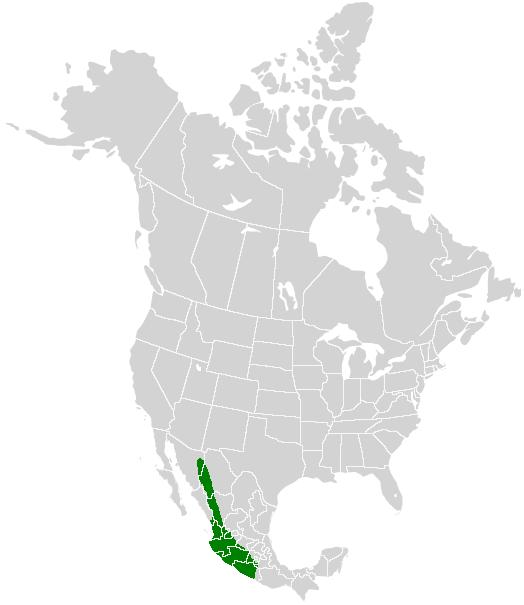

= Parides alopius =

White-dotted cattleheart

Species of butterfly

Parides alopius, the white-dotted cattleheart, is an endemic Mexican butterfly in the family Papilionidae. It has also strayed once into the United States in southeastern Arizona.

== Description ==
The upperside of the wings is black with the hindwing having two rows of submarginal spots: the first row, white; and the second row, pink. Males have fewer white spots than females. The underside of the wings are similar except the hindwing pink spots are more conspicuous. It has a wingspan of 3–3.5 in (76–89 mm).A full description is provided by Rothschild, W. and Jordan, K. (1906)

== Flight ==
This species has been seen on the wing from March to November.

== Habitat ==
The white-dotted cattleheart may be encountered in pine-oak forests.

== Life cycle ==
The larva is ringed with black and white bands and has yellow and reddish-brown fleshy projections. Each side of the body contains red, orange and white spots. The chrysalis is shaped very similar to that of the pipevine swallowtail (Battus philenor). It is blue green with the head, parts of the thorax, and abdomen a bright yellow green. It is unknown whether the chrysalis has a brown form or not.

== Host plants ==
The only recorded host plant for the white-dotted cattleheart is Watson's pipevine (Aristolochia watsonii).

== Status ==
It is uncommon and known from very few localities, but is not known to be threatened. Parides alopius is a member of the ascanius species group ("Fringe-spots white. Hindwing with submarginal spots and usnally also discal spots or dots, or a discal band; mostly with tail"). A quadrate whitish spot in space 2 of the forewings is quite peculiar of the ascanius group

The members are

- Parides agavus (Drury, 1782)
- Parides alopius (Godman & Salvin, [1890])
- Parides ascanius (Cramer, [1775])
- Parides bunichus (Hübner, [1821])
- Parides gundlachianus (C. & R. Felder, 1864)
- Parides montezuma (Westwood, 1842)
- Parides phalaecus (Hewitson, 1869)
- Parides photinus (Doubleday, 1844)
- Parides proneus (Hübner, [1831])

== Etymology ==
The specific name comes from the classical tradition. Alopius was the son of Antiope the daughter of Thespius.
