= Inari =

Inari may refer to:

== Shinto ==
- Inari Ōkami, a Shinto spirit
  - Mount Inari in Japan, site of Fushimi Inari-taisha, the main Shinto shrine to Inari
  - Inari shrine, dedicated to the Shinto god Inari
- Inari-zushi, a type of sushi

== Places ==
- Inari, Finland, municipality
- Inari (village), in the municipality of the same name in Finland
- Lake Inari, Finland
- Inari Station, a railway station in Fushimi-ku, Kyoto, Japan

== Astronomy ==
- 1532 Inari, a main-belt asteroid

== Given name ==
- Inari Karsh (born 1953), professor of Middle East and Mediterranean Studies at King's College London

== Anthropology ==
- Inari Sami people, a Sami people of Finland
- Inari Sami language, the language spoken by the Inari Sami

== Other uses ==
- Inari, a nickname for Yusuke Kitagawa from the 2016 Persona 5 video game

== See also ==
- Enaree, a Scythian shaman
- HINARI
- Hinari
- Inaria
