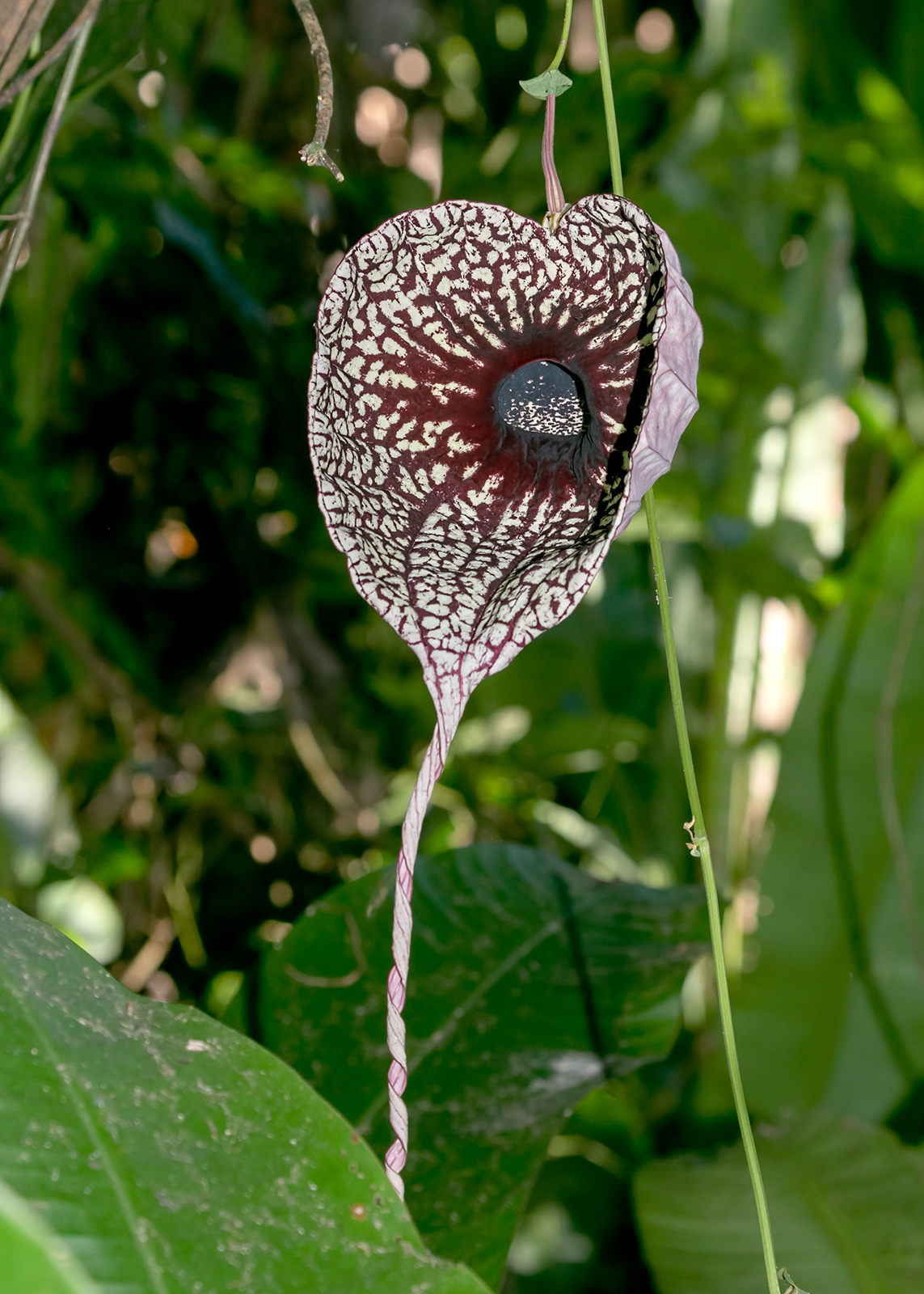

Scientific classification
- Kingdom: Plantae
- Clade: Tracheophytes
- Clade: Angiosperms
- Clade: Magnoliids
- Order: Piperales
- Family: Aristolochiaceae
- Genus: Aristolochia
- Species: A. grandiflora

Binomial name
- Aristolochia grandiflora Vahl, 1791

= Aristolochia grandiflora =

Pelican flower

Species of vine

Aristolochia grandiflora, the pelican flower, is a deciduous vine with one of the world's largest flowers that emits an odor that smells like rotting meat, attracting flies.

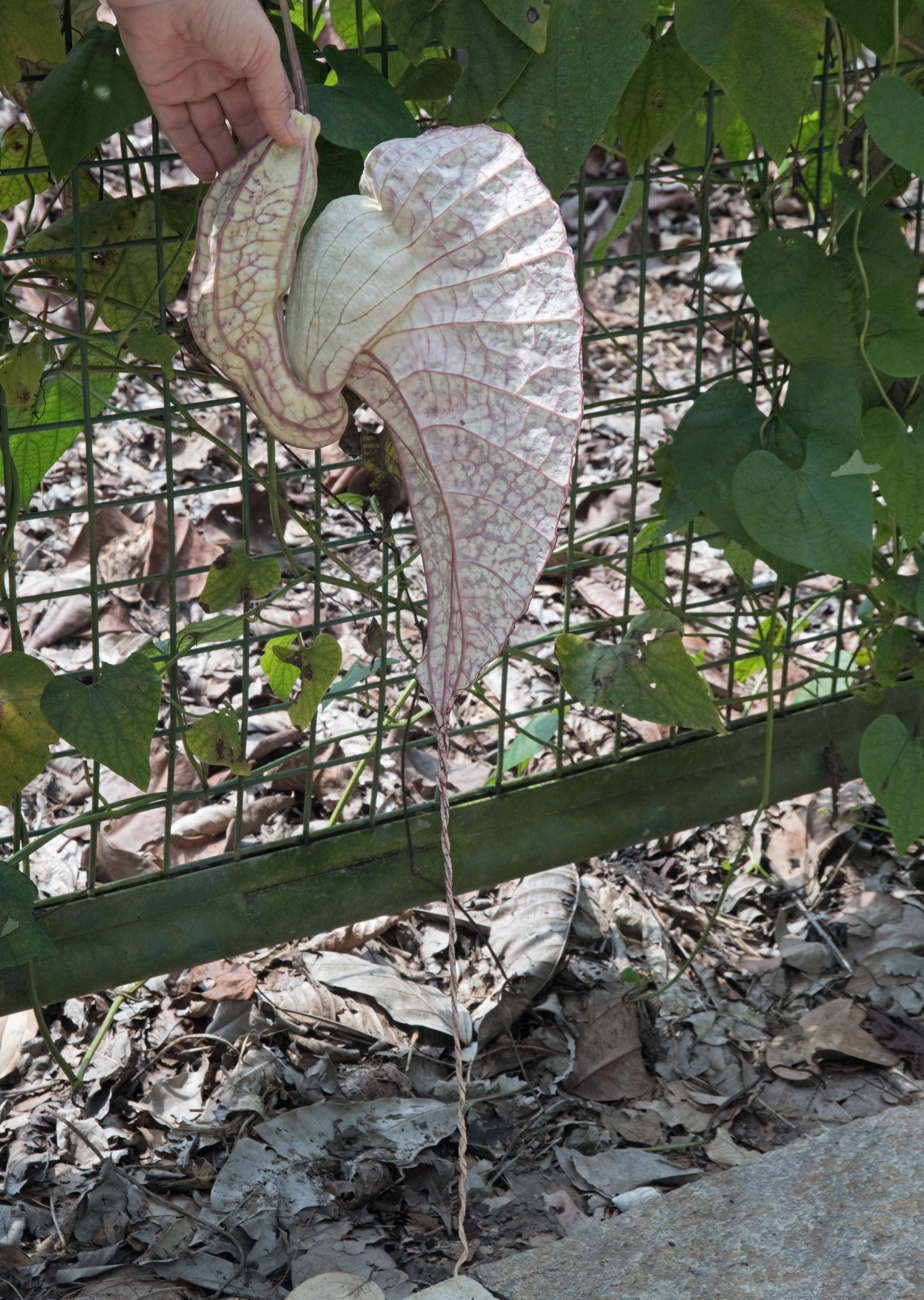
Sideview of flower

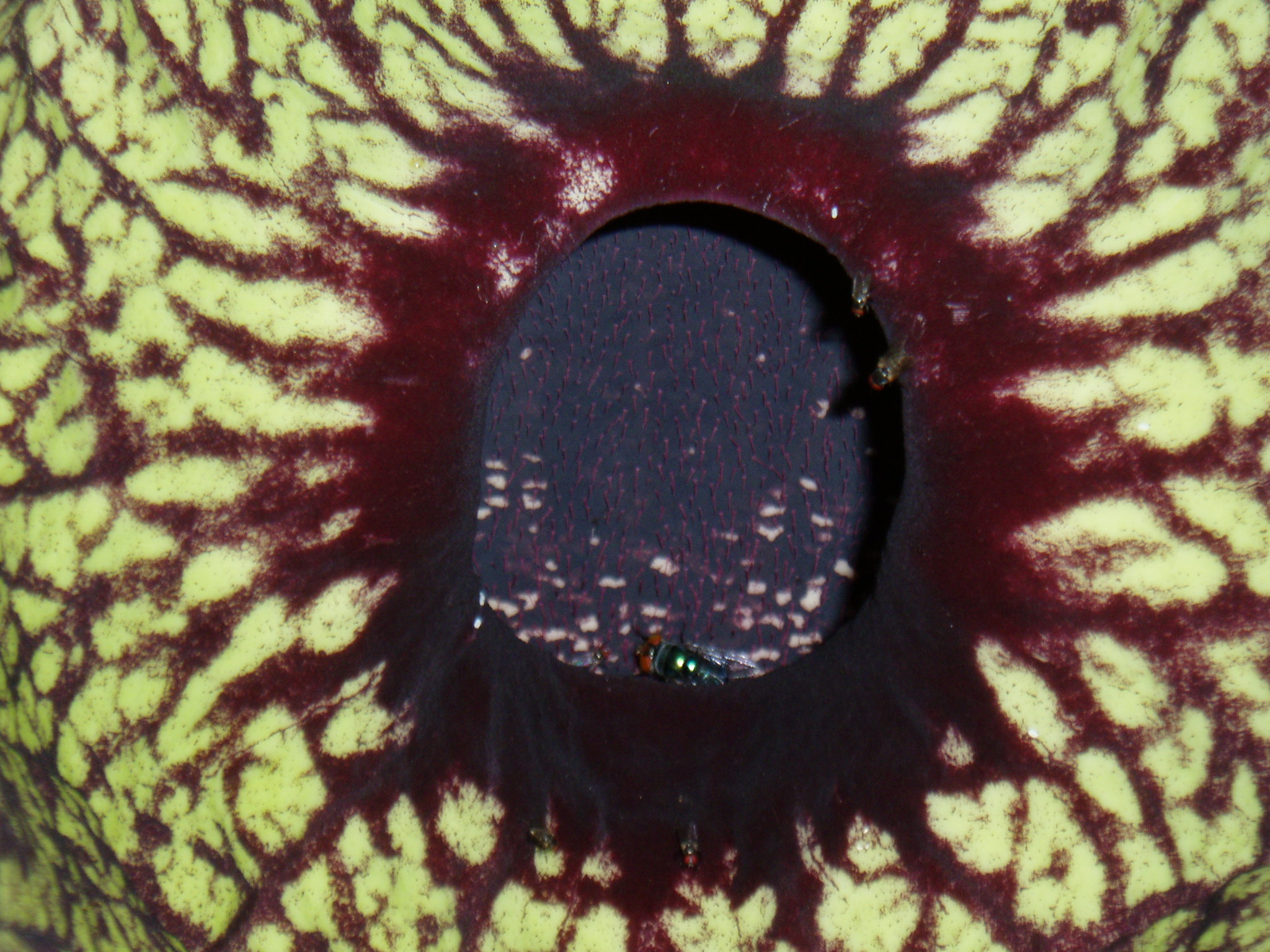
Detail of Pelican Flower with pollinators

== Description ==
Aristolochia grandiflora produces large solitary flowers from the axils of leaves. Leaves are cordate and can be up to 25 cm (9.8 in) wide. Flowers are heart shaped: 10–30 cm (3.9–11.8 in) wide and have tails that are up to 60 cm (24 in). The flower is green/white with purple/brown veins. The center of the flower is darker colored, which attracts pollinators along with a distinctive odor to its reproductive elements. The flower has three sections, utricle, tube and limb, characteristic to all Aristolochiaceae.

== Distribution and habitat ==
The plant is native to the Caribbean and Central America, and has been introduced to Florida in the United States as an attractor of butterflies. It is found in tropical forests near streams and gullies.

== Reproduction ==
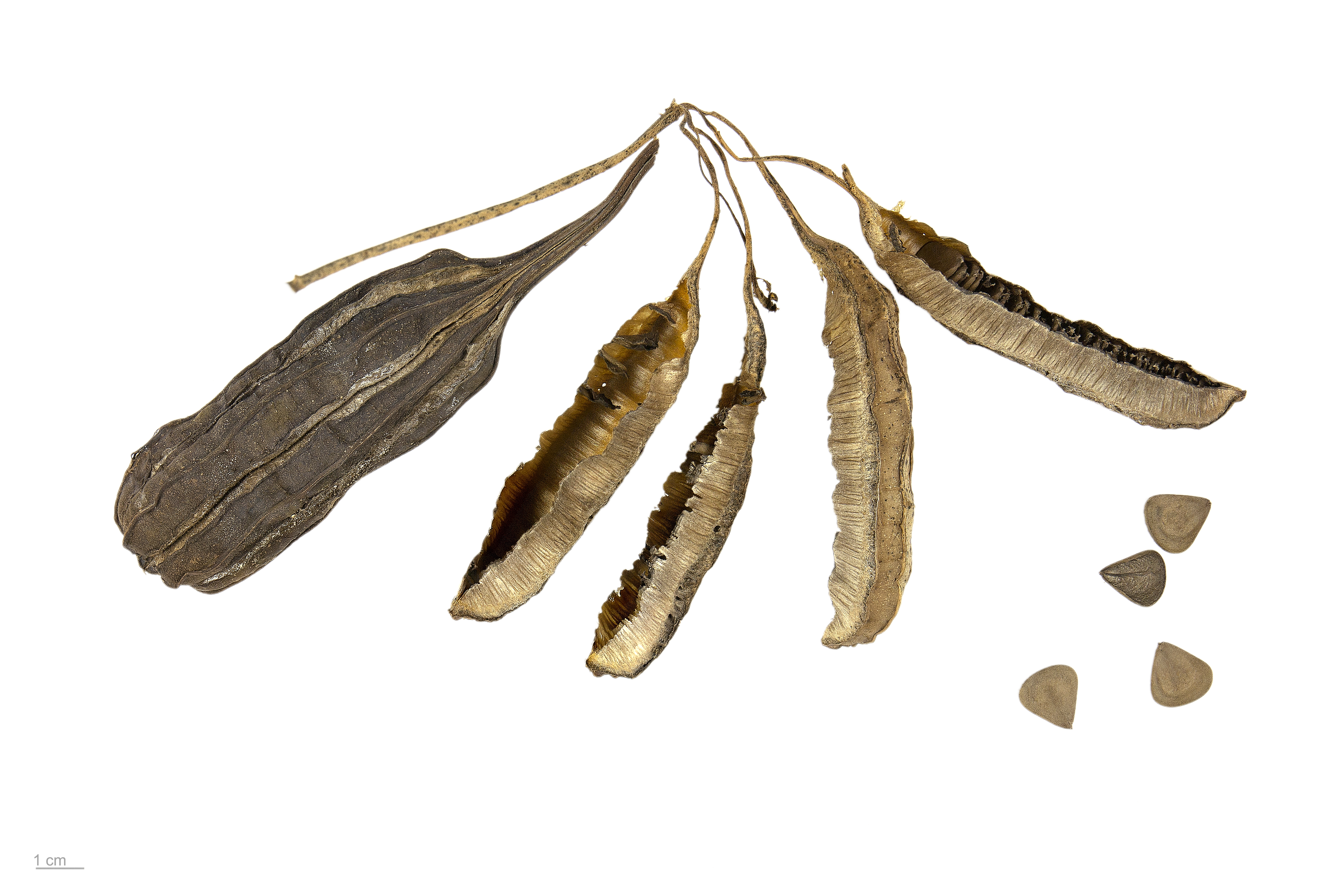
Aristolochia grandiflora (MHNT)

Aristolochia grandiflora is pollinated by breeding flies attracted by an odor produced by the flower. The odor is a combination of essential oils. Flies travel down the tubular part of the flower to the utricle where the reproductive organs are found. The tube is lined with trichomes that direct the fly down to the utricle and prevent the fly from moving out. The reproduction contains three main phases. The first phase, the fly carrying pollen from other flowers pollinates the carpel. During the second phase, the stamen mature releasing pollen on the fly. This phase lasts one day. While trapped inside the flower, the fly eats nectar produced along the walls of the utricle. The trichomes then are signaled to wither, allowing for the fly to escape. The entire reproductive process lasts two days before flower senescence and abscission occur in the third phase.

== Uses ==
Aristolochia grandiflora has been used for ornamental purposes, as a food source, and in traditional medicine. A. grandiflora is a food source for swallowtail butterfly larvae. These butterflies become unpalatable to predators when they consume the terpenes in this plant.

== Chemical constituents ==
The use of this plant poses a risk as it contains the toxin aristolochic acid which is carcinogenic. The USDA has banned all products containing this compound. A. grandiflora contains many different alkaloids (bisbenzylisoquinolinic and 8-benzylberberinic) which aid in chemical defenses against insects and plant microbes. Chemicals in the essential oils include α-phellandrene and linalool from the stems and roots; germacrene D and γ-elemene from the leaves; and trans-nerolidol and geraniol from the stem and flower.

== Other species ==
Other species of Aristolochia are also called "pelican flowers"; e.g. Aristolochia gigantea (giant pelican flower) and Aristolochia nana (tiny pelican flower).
