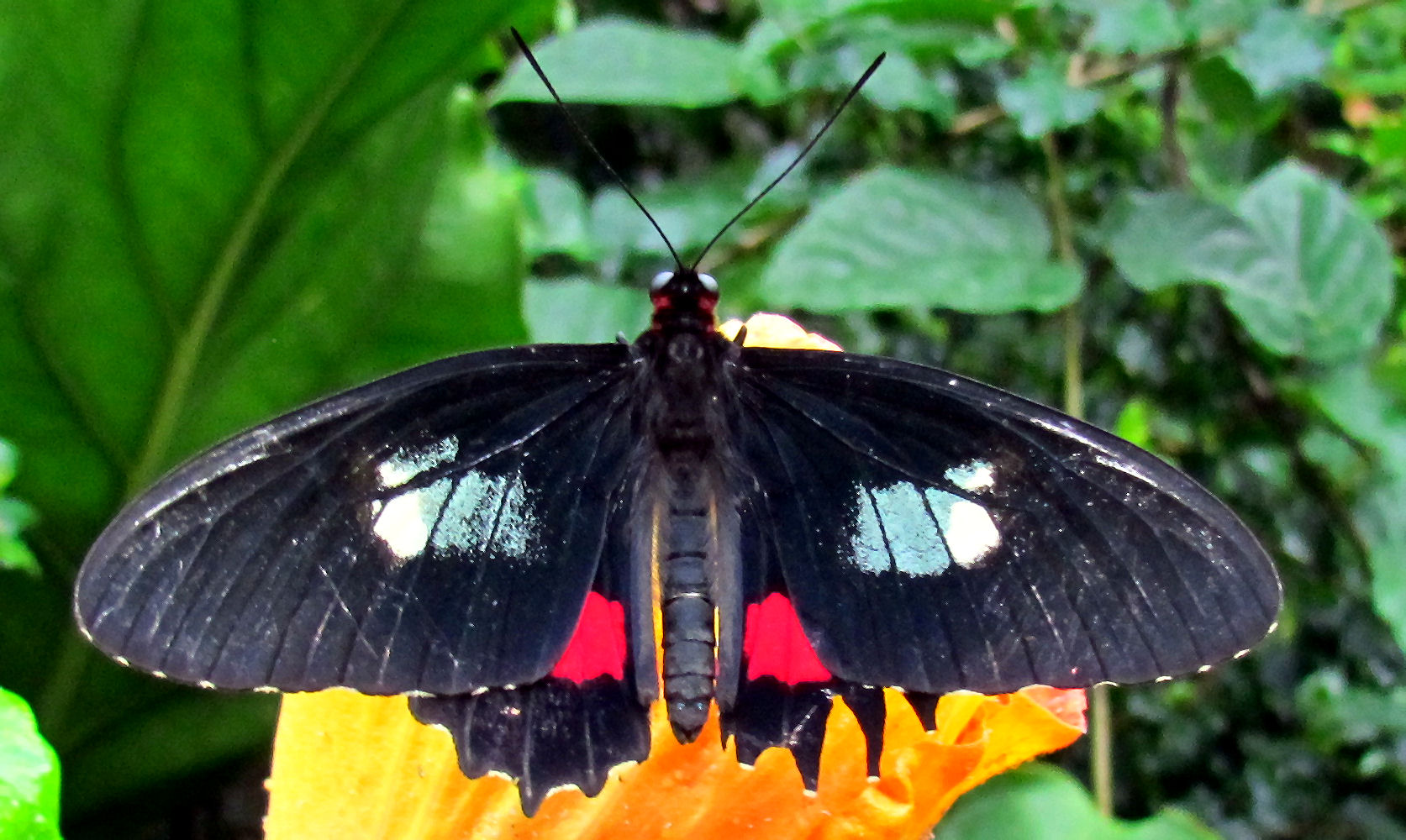
- Male, dorsal view
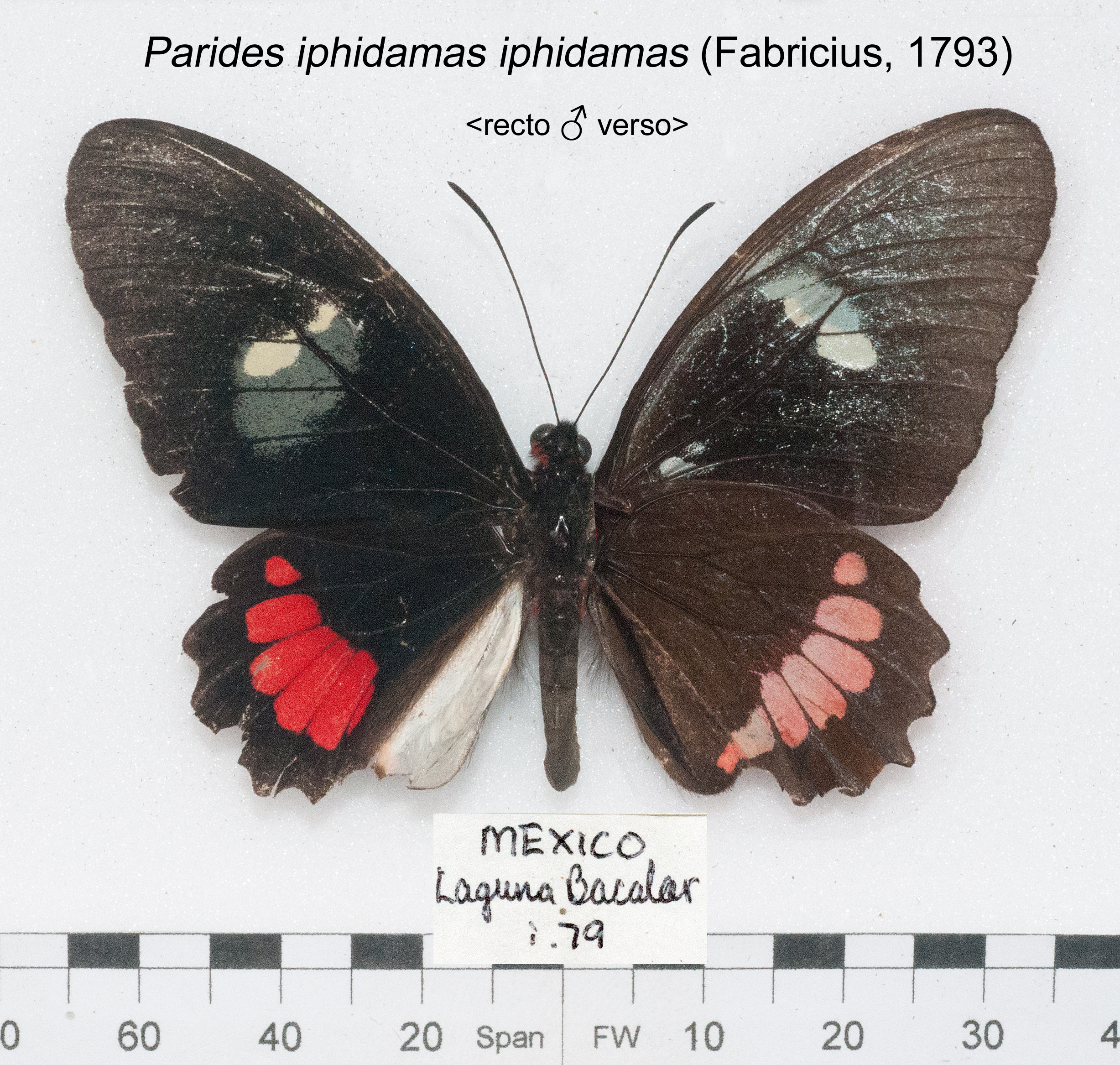

Scientific classification
- Kingdom: Animalia
- Phylum: Arthropoda
- Clade: Pancrustacea
- Class: Insecta
- Order: Lepidoptera
- Family: Papilionidae
- Genus: Parides
- Species: P. iphidamas

Binomial name
- Parides iphidamas (Fabricius, 1793)

Synonyms
- Papilio iphidamas Fabricius, 1793

= Parides iphidamas =

Iphidamas cattleheart

Species of butterfly

Parides iphidamas, the Iphidamas cattleheart or Transandean cattleheart, is a species of Neotropical butterfly in the family Papilionidae.

== Subspecies ==
- P. i. iphidamas (Fabricius, 1793) (southern Mexico to Panama)
- P. i. ayabacensis (Joicey & Talbot, 1918) (southern Ecuador to northern Peru)
- P. i. calogyna (Rothchild & Jordan, 1906) (western Ecuador)
- P. i. elatos (Rothchild & Jordan, 1906) (northwestern Colombia)
- P. i. gorgonae Vélez & Salazar, 1991 (Colombia)
- P. i. phalias (Rothchild & Jordan, 1906) (central Colombia)
- P. i. teneates (Rothchild & Jordan, 1906) (northeastern Colombia to northwestern Venezuela)

== Description ==
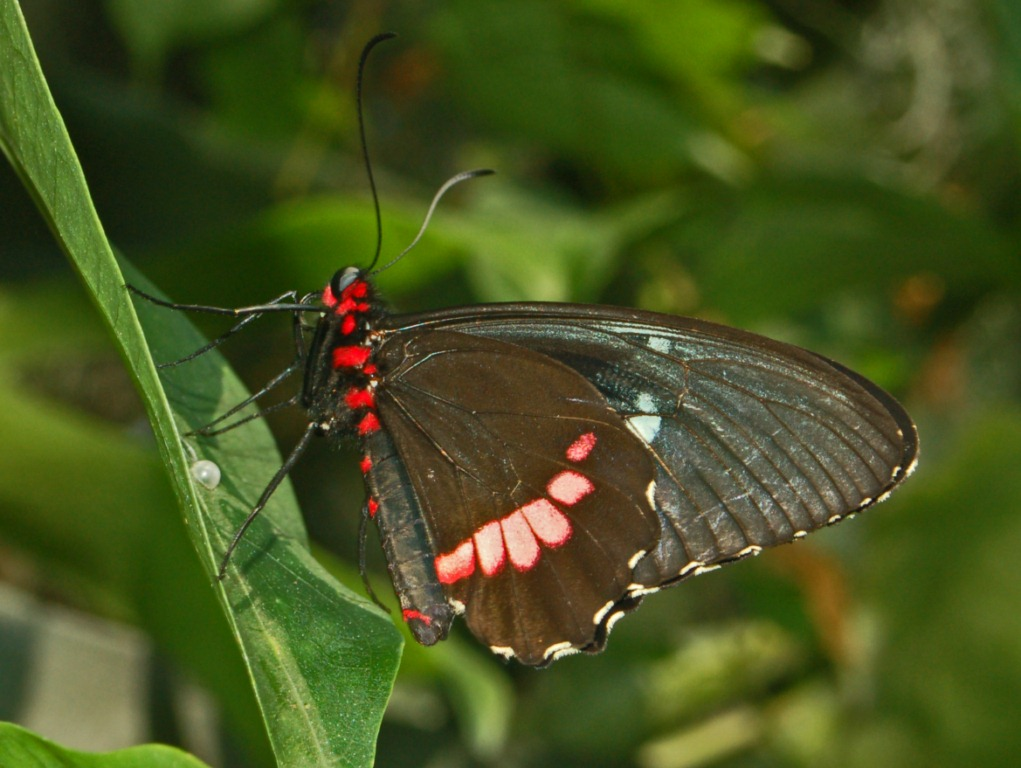
Ventral view of a Parides iphidamas laying an egg

Parides iphidamas has a wingspan of about 10 centimetres (3.9 in). The dorsal sides of the forewings are black, with a broad green and white spots (completely white in females), while the dorsal sides of the hindwings show a broad red band or spot. Along the edges there are many small yellow spots. The undersides of the wings are black with a white band on the forewings and several pink patches on the hindwings. The body of the butterfly is black with red dots. The poisonous caterpillars are chocolate brown, with white or brown protrusions resembling thorns. The host plants are various toxic Aristolochia species (A. cordiflora, A. maxima, A. odoratissma, A. pilosa, A. ringens, and A. tonduzii).

== Description from Seitz ==
P. iphidamas. Male: tibiae and 1 segment of the tarsi thickened and covered with fine hairs. Female :forewing at the margin less deep black than in P. erithalion. Mexico to Ecuador and North Venezuela. A common species, which is not easy to distinguish from P. erithalion and P.lycimenes, and is consequently often mistaken for them. — iphidamas F. (= panares Gray, achelous Hopff., incandescens Btlr.) is the Central American form. Male: forewing distally not transparent; the green area usually reduced, always enclosing one or two white spots; often a white spot in the cell; band of the hindwing gradually widened posteriorly, a narrow spot behind the 2.median. Female: cell-spot on the forewing large, usually some smallspots beyond the cell; the spot before the 2.median smaller than the preceding one, or obliquely cut off towards the base; band of the hindwing almost unicolorous bright red, its inner margin evenly curved. South Mexico to Panama. — phalias R & J. (4b). Male: the green area widest posteriorly, reaching to the hindmargin; hindwing with three red spots separate from the cell. Female: forewing slightly transparent at the apex: cell-spot very large; the spot before the 1.median much larger than the preceding one; band of the hindwing very broad, pale on the inner side. Colombia: Magdalena Valley and Cordillera of Bogota. —elatos R & J. Male : the green area smaller than in the preceding subspecies; hindwing with three small red spots. Cauca Valley. — calogyna R. & J. (4b).Male: forewing exteriorly somewhat more thickly scaled than in phalias and elatos, usually a white spot before the 2.median; hindwing with 3 small red spots, close together. Female: the spot before the 1.median of the forewing larger than the preceding one; band of the hindwing bright red, its inner margin usually white. West Ecuador and west coast of Colombia. —teneates R.&J. Male : the green area narrow, separated from the cell, usually enclosing one or two white spots. Female not known with certainty. North Venezuela and North Colombia.

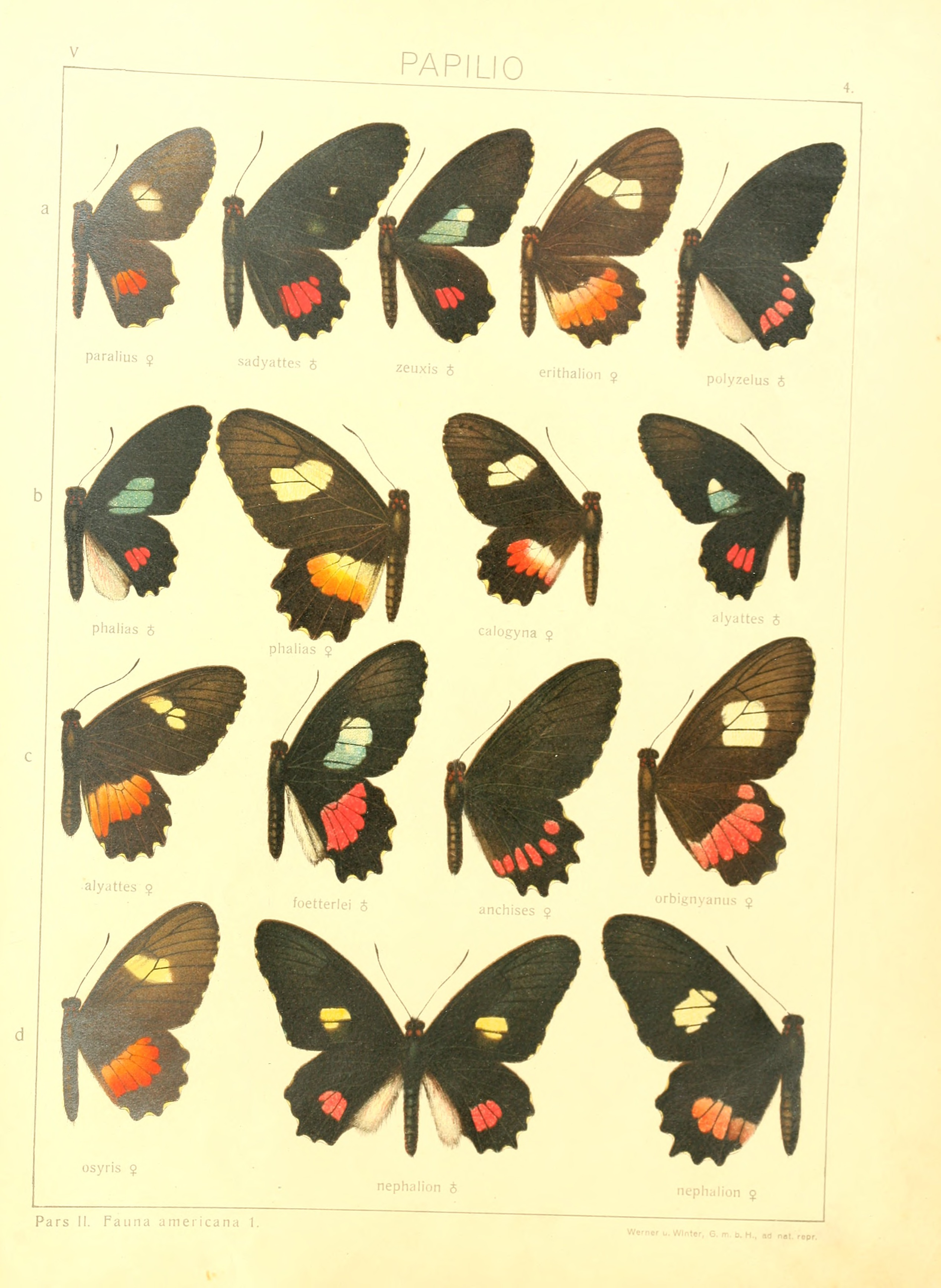
Seitz

== Description from Rothschild and Jordan(1906) ==
A full description is provided by Rothschild, W. and Jordan, K. (1906)

== Distribution ==
This species is native to the Central and South America. It occurs from southeastern Mexico to Costa Rica, Panama, and Peru.

== Habitat ==
It is common in various habitats, ranging from open lowlands to wooded areas and tropical forests from sea level to 1,200 meters (3,900 ft). Females mainly occur where the caterpillar host plant are located, in forest clearings and along forest edges.

== Taxonomy ==
Parides iphidamas is a member of the anchises species group

The members are

- Parides anchises
- Parides cutorina
- Parides erithalion
- Parides iphidamas
- Parides panares
- Parides phosphorus
- Parides vertumnus
