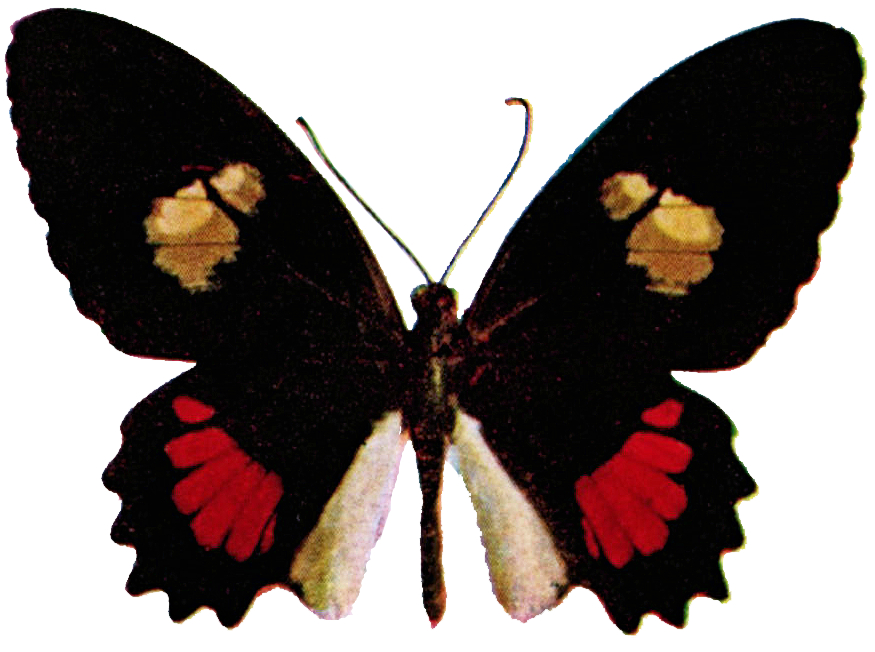

Scientific classification
- Kingdom: Animalia
- Phylum: Arthropoda
- Class: Insecta
- Order: Lepidoptera
- Family: Papilionidae
- Genus: Parides
- Species: P. panares

Binomial name
- Parides panares (Gray, [1853])

Synonyms
- Papilio panares Gray, [1853]

= Parides panares =

Wedge-spotted cattleheart

Species of butterfly

Parides panares, the wedge-spotted cattleheart, is a species of butterfly in the family Papilionidae native to the Americas. The larvae feed on Aristolochia maxima and A. pilosa.

== Subspecies ==
- P. p. panares (Gray, [1853]) (southeastern Mexico)
- P. p. erythrus (Rothchild & Jordan, 1906) (Panama to Colombia)
- P. p. lycimenes (Boisduval, 1836) (southeastern Mexico to Panama)
- P. p. paralius (Rothchild & Jordan, 1906) (Ecuador)
- P. p. rachelii K. S. Brown, 1994 (northern Venezuela)
- P. p. tachira T. Racheli, 1991 (southwestern Venezuela)

== Description from Seitz ==
[panares panares = iphidamas in Seitz (misident.) Mexico] P. lycimenes. Male : somewhat smaller than P. vertumnus, the red area of the hindwing less triangular and its last spot smaller. Female: forewing slightly transparent at the apex; the spots somewhat yellowish, not pure white, the cell-spot usually large and extended across the cell; band of the hindwing less bright red than in P. vertumnus. Tibiae of the male not thickened. Guatemala to Ecuador, in several subspecies. — lycimenes Boisd. is the Central American form. Forewing with a large green spot, which almost always encloses at least one white spot; often a spot in the cell; hindwing with 4—6 red spots. In the female the yellowish white spot before the 1.median much larger than the preceding one; band of the hindwing broad, almost always a uniform bright red. Guatemala to Panama; also on the small islands on the west coast of the Republic of Panama. — erythrus R. & J. (3d), male : the green spot broader than in the preceding form, reaching to the hindmargin of the wing. Female: the spot before the 1.median of the forewing larger than in the preceding form; the band of the hindwing paler. Central and East Colombia and North Venezuela. — paralius R. & .J. (4a). Small, male : forewing with round yellow-white spot before the 2. median; band of the hindwing short and narrow. Female: spot on the forewing purer white than in the previous subspecies, the cell-spot reduced; the spot before the 2. median the largest; band of the hindwing almost straight. West Ecuador.

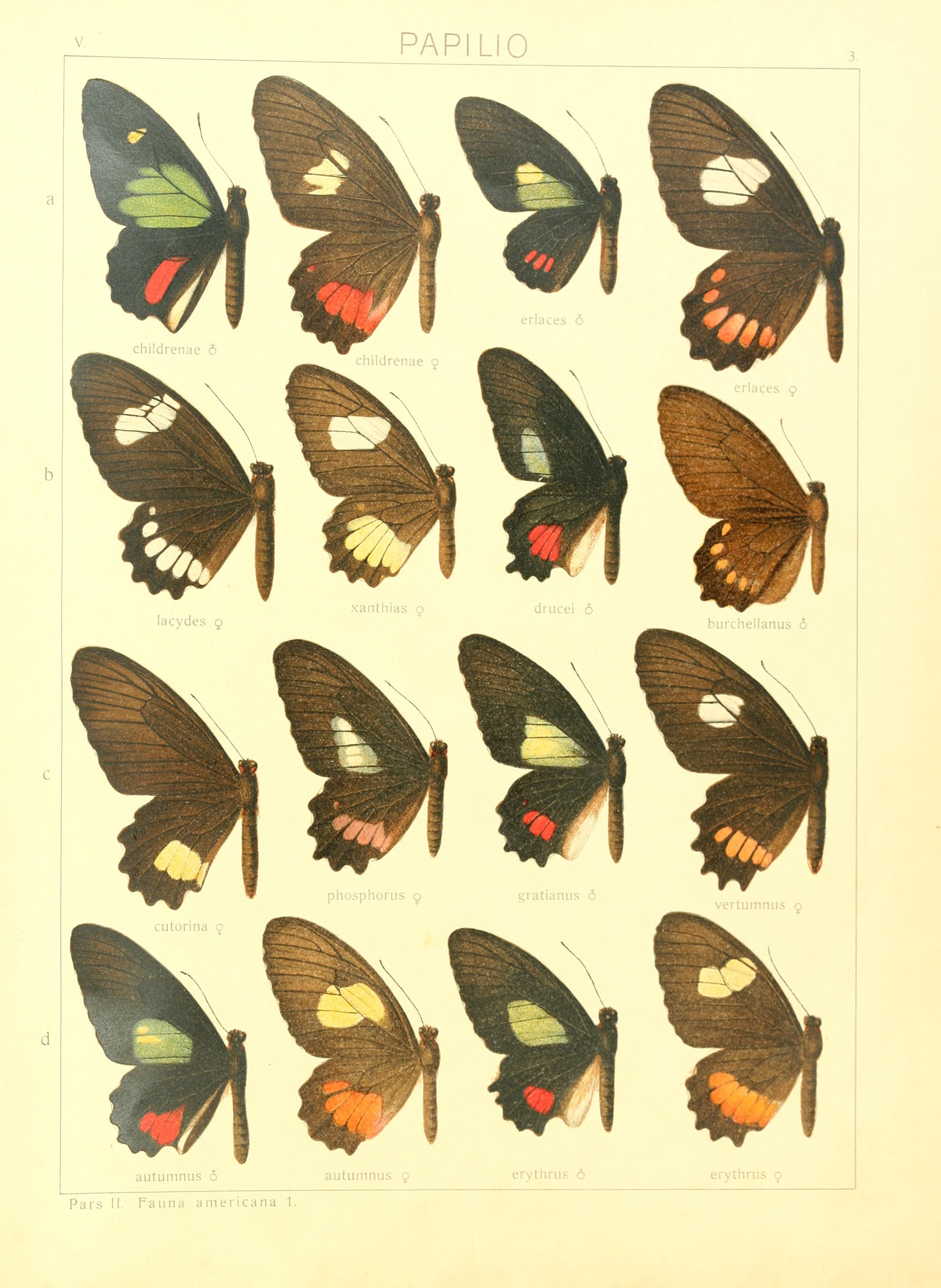
Seitz Plate 3

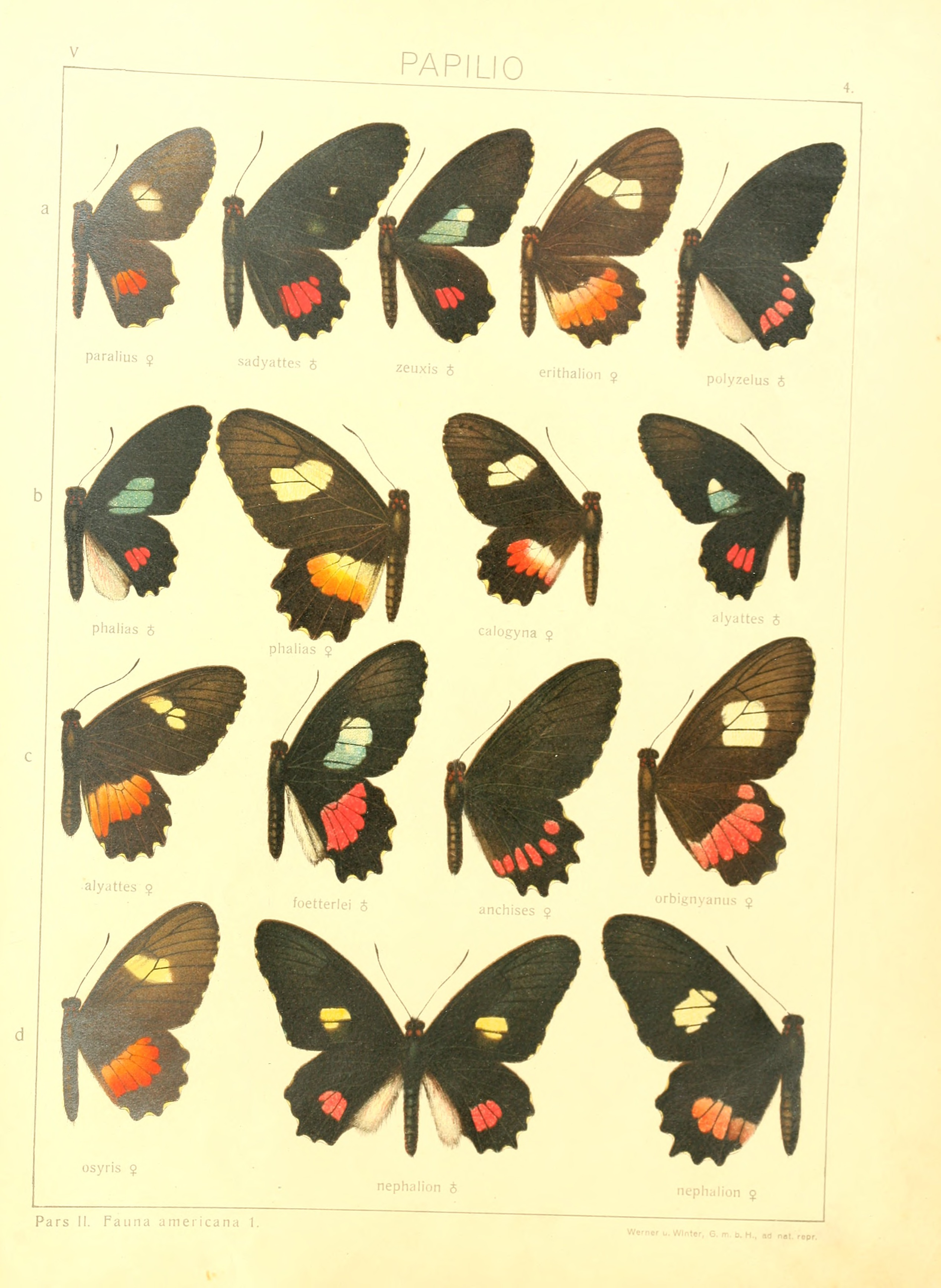
Seitz Plate 4

== Description from Rothschild and Jordan(1906) ==
A full description is provided by Rothschild, W. and Jordan, K. (1906) See note on synonymy under Seitz (above).

== Taxonomy ==
Parides panares is a member of the anchises species group

The members are

- Parides anchises
- Parides cutorina
- Parides erithalion
- Parides iphidamas
- Parides panares
- Parides phosphorus
- Parides vertumnus
