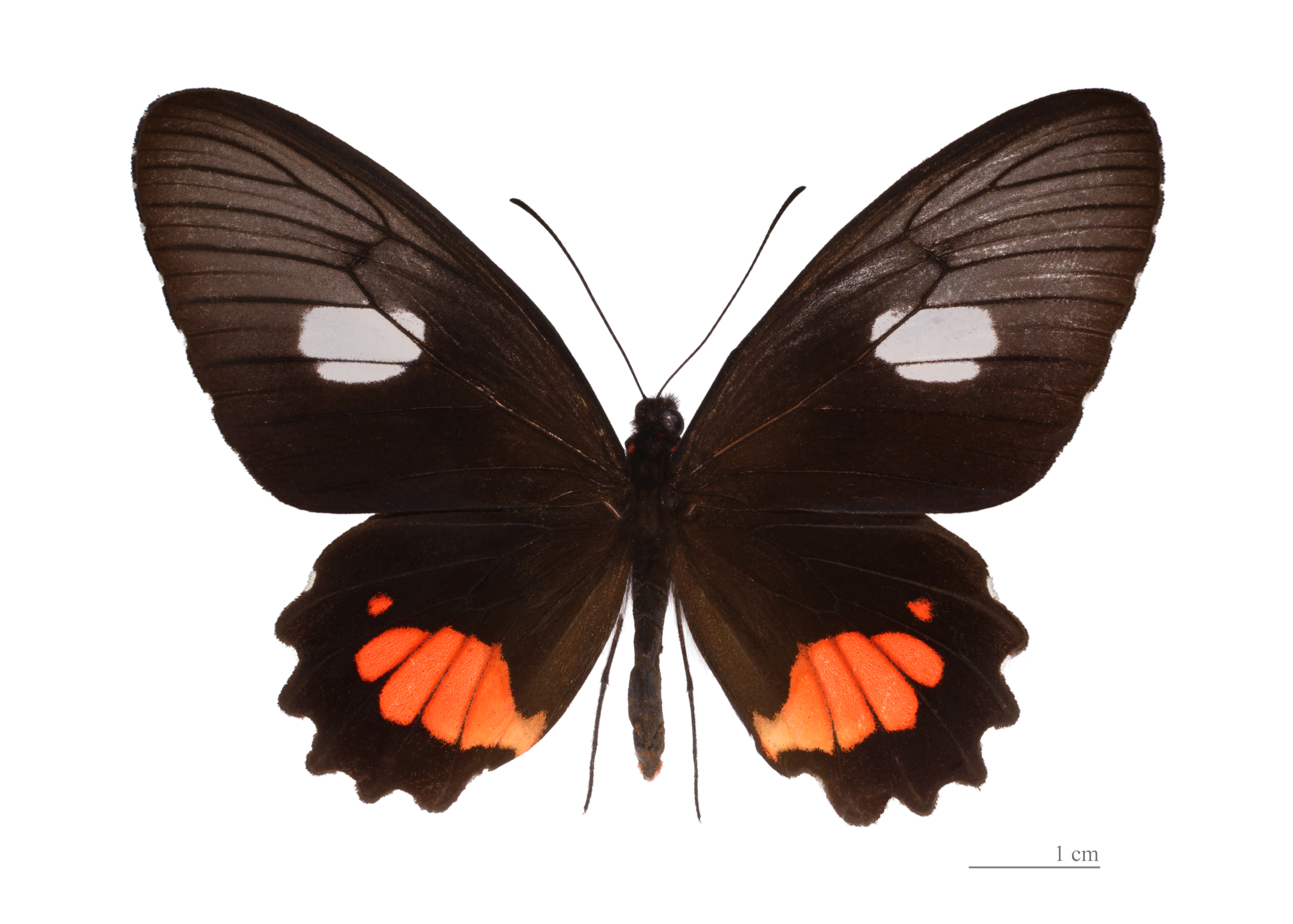
- Parides anchises anchises
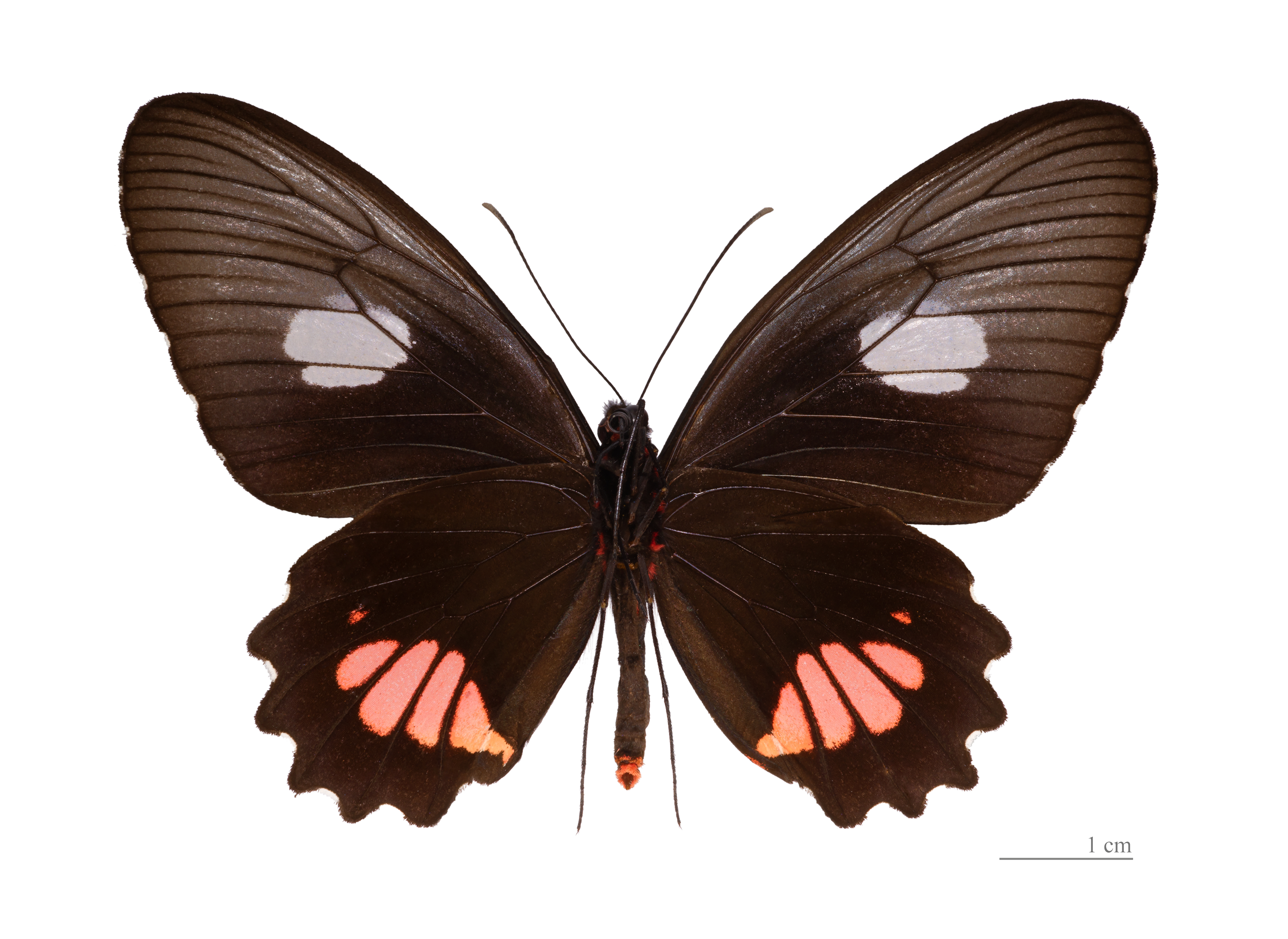
- Parides anchises anchises, underside

Scientific classification
- Kingdom: Animalia
- Phylum: Arthropoda
- Class: Insecta
- Order: Lepidoptera
- Family: Papilionidae
- Genus: Parides
- Species: P. anchises

Binomial name
- Parides anchises (Linnaeus, 1758)

Synonyms
- Papilio anchises Linnaeus, 1758; Papilio telmosis H. W. Bates, 1861; Papilio eteocles C. Felder & R. Felder, 1865; Papilio citri Fabricius, 1938 (repl. name)

= Parides anchises =

Species of butterfly

Parides anchises, the Anchises cattleheart, is a species of butterfly in the family Papilionidae native to the Americas. It is common and not threatened. The larvae feed on Aristolochia species including: A. brazilsis, A. bukuti, A. colombiana, A. cymbifera, A. fimbriata, A. inflata, A. macroura, A. odora, A. ringens, and A. triangularis.

== Subspecies ==
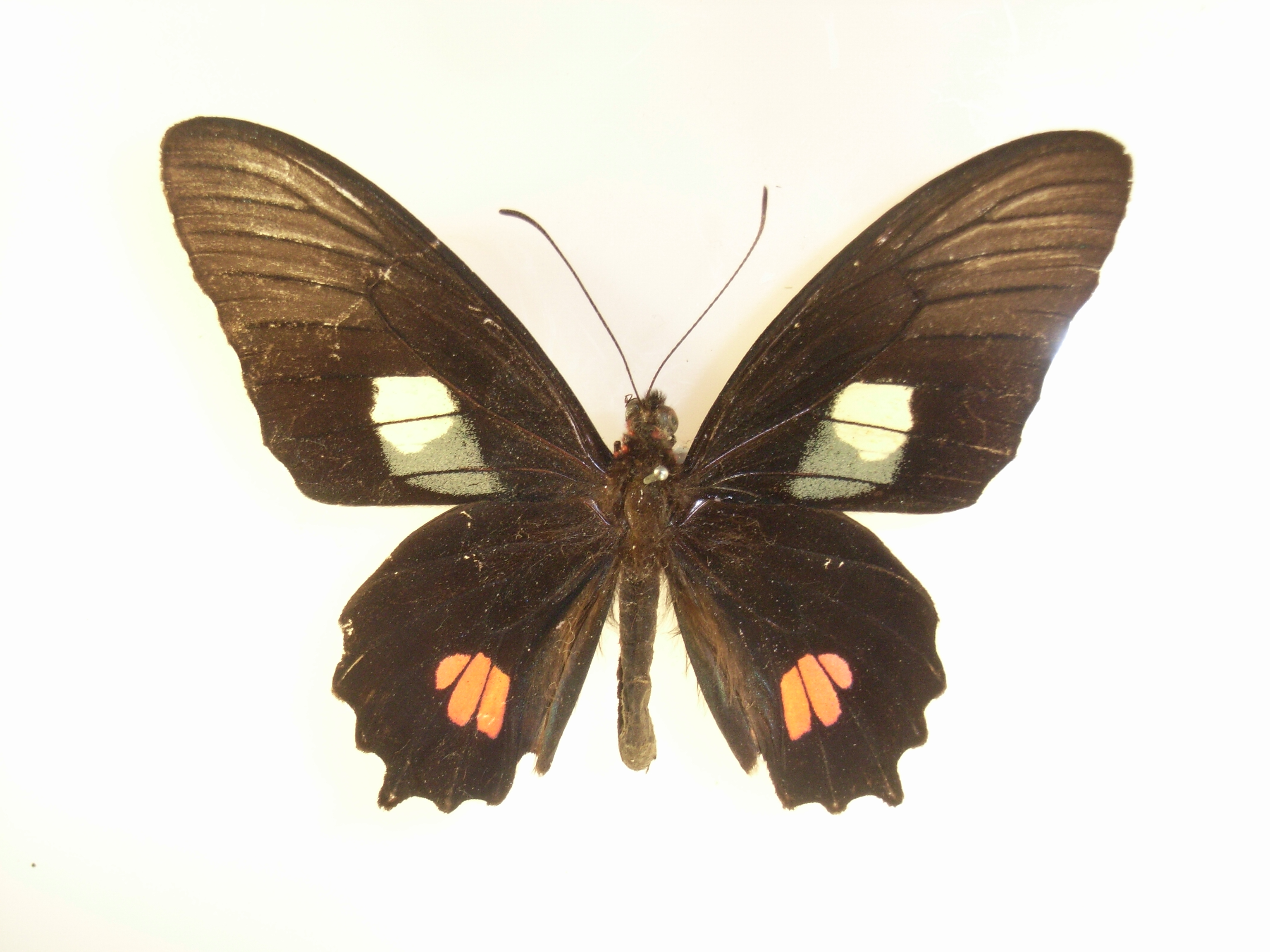
P. a. nephalion

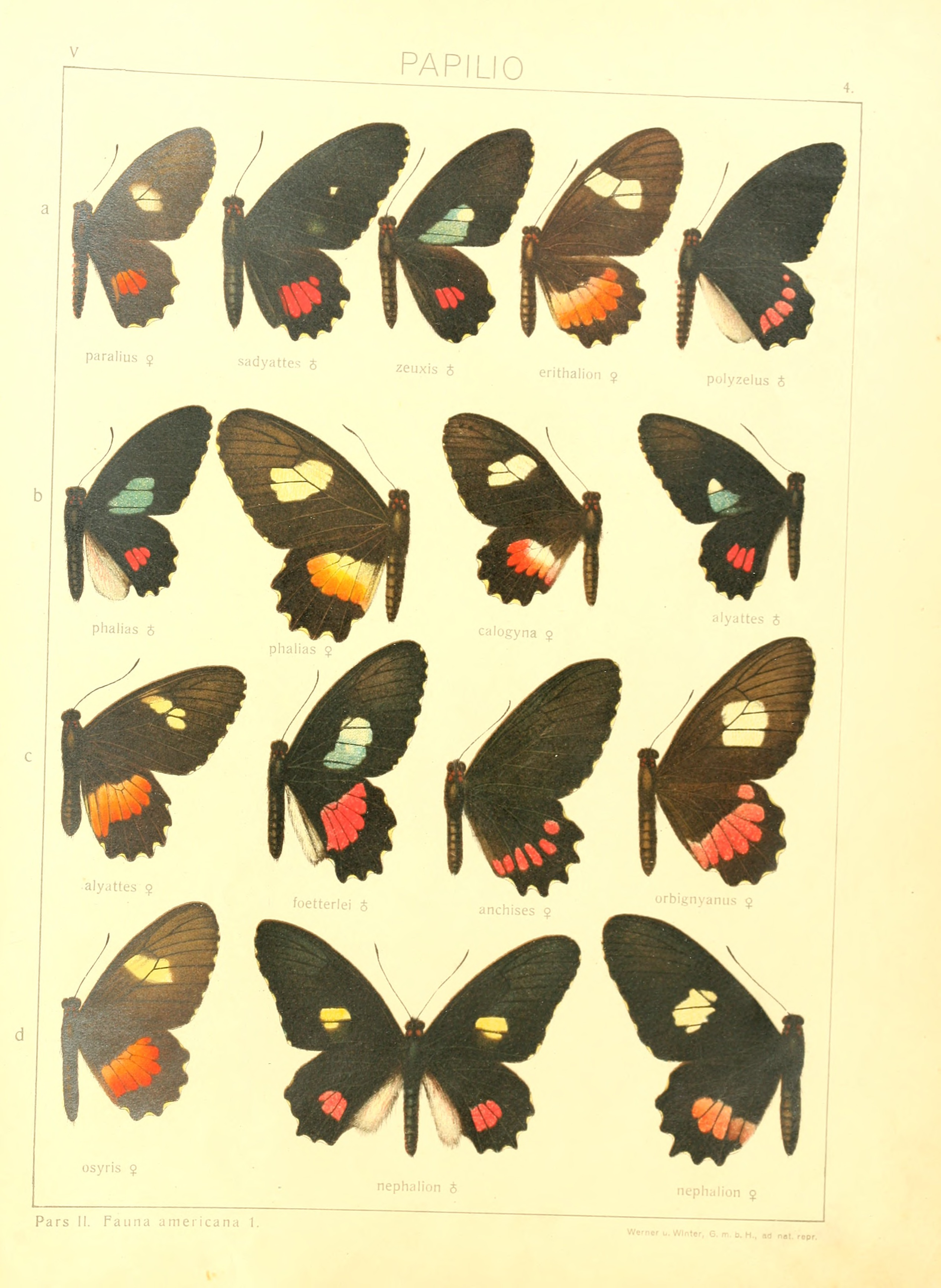
Plate depicting several subspecies

- P. a. anchises (Linnaeus, 1758) (Guyana to French Guiana)
- P. a. alyattes (C. Felder & R. Felder, 1861) (central Colombia)
- P. a. bukuti Brévignon, 1998 (French Guiana)
- P. a. cymochles (Doubleday, 1844) (Trinidad and eastern Venezuela)
- P. a. drucei (Butler, 1874) (Colombia to northern Bolivia)
- P. a. etias (Rothchild & Jordan, 1906) (northern Bolivia)
- P. a. farfan K. S. Brown, 1994 (Panama)
- P. a. foetterlei (Rothchild & Jordan, 1906) (central to southern Brazil)
- P. a. humaita D'Abrera, 1981 (northwestern Brazil)
- P. a. koenigi T. Racheli, 1989 (Peru)
- P. a. marinae T. Racheli, 1987 (Peru)
- P. a. marthilia R. G. Maza, 1999 (southern Mexico)
- P. a. nephalion (Godart, 1819) (eastern Brazil to Paraguay and northern Argentina)
- P. a. nielseni Bollino & Salazar, 2001 (Colombia)
- P. a. orbignyanus (Lucas, 1852) (central Brazil to Paraguay)
- P. a. orinocensis (Rousseau-Decelle, 1960) (northeastern Venezuela)
- P. a. osyris (C. Felder & R. Felder, 1861) (Venezuela)
- P. a. serapis (Boisduval, 1836) (northern Colombia to Venezuela)
- P. a. stilbon (Kollar, 1839) (southern Brazil)
- P. a. thelios (Gray, [1853]) (northern Brazil)

== Description from Seitz ==
P. anchises. Apex of the forewing distinctly, though only slightly, transparent. Male: tibiae and 1. segment of the tarsi thickened and covered with fine hairs; hindwing blue, strongly iridescent. female; the spot before the 1. median larger than the preceding spot. Colombia to South Brazil and Paraguay. The black-brown larva has on the first and on the penultimate segment two dorsal spots, and on each of the thoracic segments and the 8. and 9. abdominals one lateral spot; on the 6. and 7. segments is an oblique lateral band, sometimes broken up into spots. The dorsal humps on the pupa are three-edged and rather small. — alyattes Fldr. (4b, c). Male: the green area separate from the cell, enclosing at least one white spot, placed before the 2. median, many specimens with a second spot before the 1. median; the last spot on the inner surface of the hindwing larger than in P. iphidamas phalias. Female: cell-spot narrow; band of the hindwing entering the end of the cell, black outer margin wider than in iphidamas. Colombia, in the Magdalena Valley- and probably- on both sides of the Cordillera of Bogota. — serapis Boisd. Male: the green area very long and narrow, only- a little wider posteriorly than anteriorly; band of the hindwing consisting of at least five spots. Female: cell-spot large, almost triangular, the spot before the 1. median very large and the band on the hindwing very broad. North Colombia. The distribution of serapis and alyattes is only very imperfectly known. — osyris Fldr. (= xenares Fldr., toxaris Fldr., severus Fldr.) (4 b). Male: the green area of the forewing and the band of the hindwing broader than in serapis. Female: the cell-spot usually extending transversely across the cell; the band of the hindwing very little paler internally than externally. Venezuela. — cymochles Doubl. (= anacharsis Fldr.). Male : forewing with one to three spots; hindwing with three, occasionally four, red spots. Female: spots of the forewing purer white than in the preceding subspecies;cell-spot small; band of the hindwing almost unicolorous red, broadest in the middle. Trinidad, Paria Peninsida and Orinoco. — anchises L. (= telmosis Bates, toxaris Fldr.) (4 c). Male : green area narrow, sometimes wanting; hindwing more strongly dentate than in the other forms, the red spots usually widely separated. Female: forewing without cell-spot or with merely a cell-streak, often without any spots; hindwing with a row of six or seven red spots, separated from one another. Dutch and French Guiana. — thelios Gray (= hierocles Gray, aglaope Gray [partim.]) (5 a). Male : the green area triangular, enclosing one or two rather large white spots; hindwing with three or four red spots, of which the one before the 2. median is the largest. Female: forewing with at least two white spots, the one before the 2. median the largest; hindwing with seven or eight separated spots. Lower Amazon, from Para to Santarem; occurs in dry, sandy places in the forest, not in the swamps. — etias R.& J. Male: palpi sometimes almost without red scales; hindwing without a red spot before the 1. radial, or this spot very small. Female: spots on the forewing pure white, cellspot very small, two large white spots before and behind the 1. median. East Bolivia, found by J. Steinbach in December, January- and April–May. — orbignyanus Luc. (4 c). The red band on the hindwing of the male is uniformly curved and becomes gradually narrower anteriorly; the forewing has at least one large white spot. In the female a spot in the cell of the forewing and at least two on the disc; hindwing with a band from the subcostal to the hindmargin. Paraguay; northern part of Entre Rios; Matto Grosso; Goyaz. — —foetterlei -R. & J. (4 c). White spots on the forewing of both sexes very large and the band on the hindwing very broad. In the interior of the province of Sao Paulo.

== Description from Rothschild and Jordan(1906) ==
A full description is provided by Rothschild, W. and Jordan, K. (1906)

== Taxonomy ==
Parides anchises is a member of the anchises species group

The members are

- Parides anchises
- Parides cutorina
- Parides erithalion
- Parides iphidamas
- Parides panares
- Parides phosphorus
- Parides vertumnus
