= Parides phosphorus =

- Subspecies P. p. gratianus, figure 13

Scientific classification
- Kingdom: Animalia
- Phylum: Arthropoda
- Clade: Pancrustacea
- Class: Insecta
- Order: Lepidoptera
- Family: Papilionidae
- Genus: Parides
- Species: P. phosphorus

Binomial name
- Parides phosphorus (H.W. Bates, 1861)

Synonyms
- Papilio phosphorus Bates, 1861; Papilio gratianus Hewitson, 1861; Papilio phosphorus var. colombianus Krüger, 1925

Species of butterfly

Parides phosphorus is a species of butterfly in the family Papilionidae. It is found in the Neotropical realm.

The larvae feed on Aristolochia.

== Subspecies ==
- P. p. phosphorus Guianas, eastern Venezuela, Brazil (Pará)
- P. p. gratianus (Hewitson, 1861) Colombia
- P. p. vavi Racheli, 1992
- P. p. zopyron Lamas, 1998 northern Peru
- P. p. laurae Bollino & Costa, 2004 southeastern Venezuela

== Description from Seitz ==
P. phosphorus. Palpi red. Forewing somewhat transparent distally; male with dirty-green spot; hindwing rather strongly dentate, the red spots remote from the cell. Tibiae armed with spines, not thickened. Female with grey-green area on the forewing before the hindmargin, which occurs in no other female of the Aristolochia- Papilios. Colombia; Guiana; Lower Amazon; East Peru; perhaps more widely distributed. A rare insect; probably a swamp species which escapes observation. Two subspecies: — phosphorus Bates (3c) occurs in British Guiana and at the Lower Amazon. The green spot on the forewing of the male is narrow and separated from the cell. The forewing of the female has a row of 4 white spots on the grey-green area (always?). — gratianus Hew. (3 c) inhabits Colombia and East Peru. The green spot on the forewing of the male is much broader than in the preceding form; hindwing with only 3, or rarely 4, red spots, the series not curved. Forewing of the female with two white spots; the posterior spots of the hindwing large

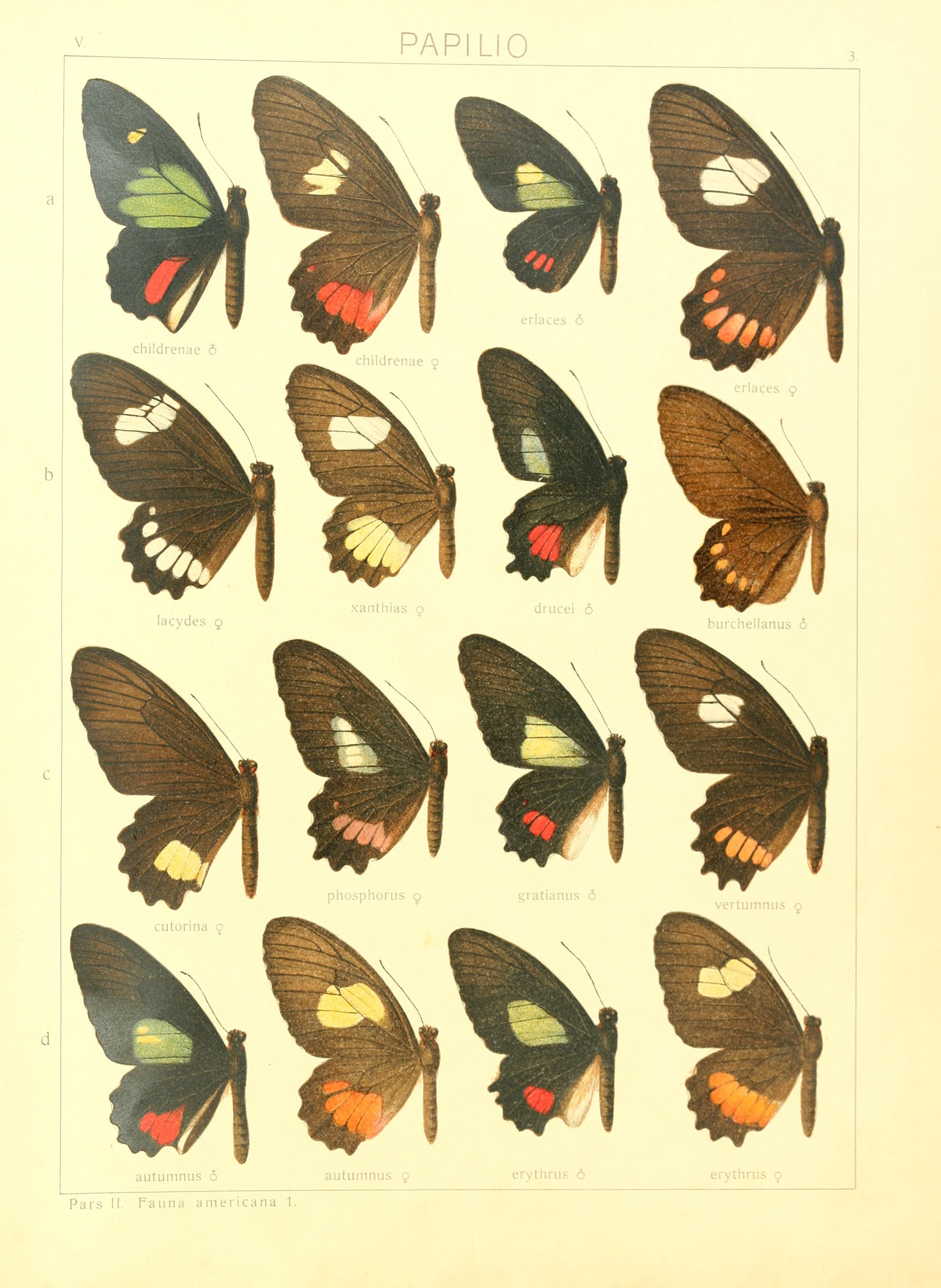
P. phosphorus phosphorus in Seitz

== Description from Rothschild and Jordan(1906) ==
A full description is provided by Rothschild, W. and Jordan, K. (1906)

== Taxonomy ==
Parides phosphorus is a member of the anchises species group

The members are

- Parides anchises
- Parides cutorina
- Parides erithalion
- Parides iphidamas
- Parides panares
- Parides phosphorus
- Parides vertumnus

Other species in the anchises group were often incorrectly cited as Papilio phosphorus by earlier authors, and various subspecies (e.g., P. p. gratianus) were often confused with each other or other species.
