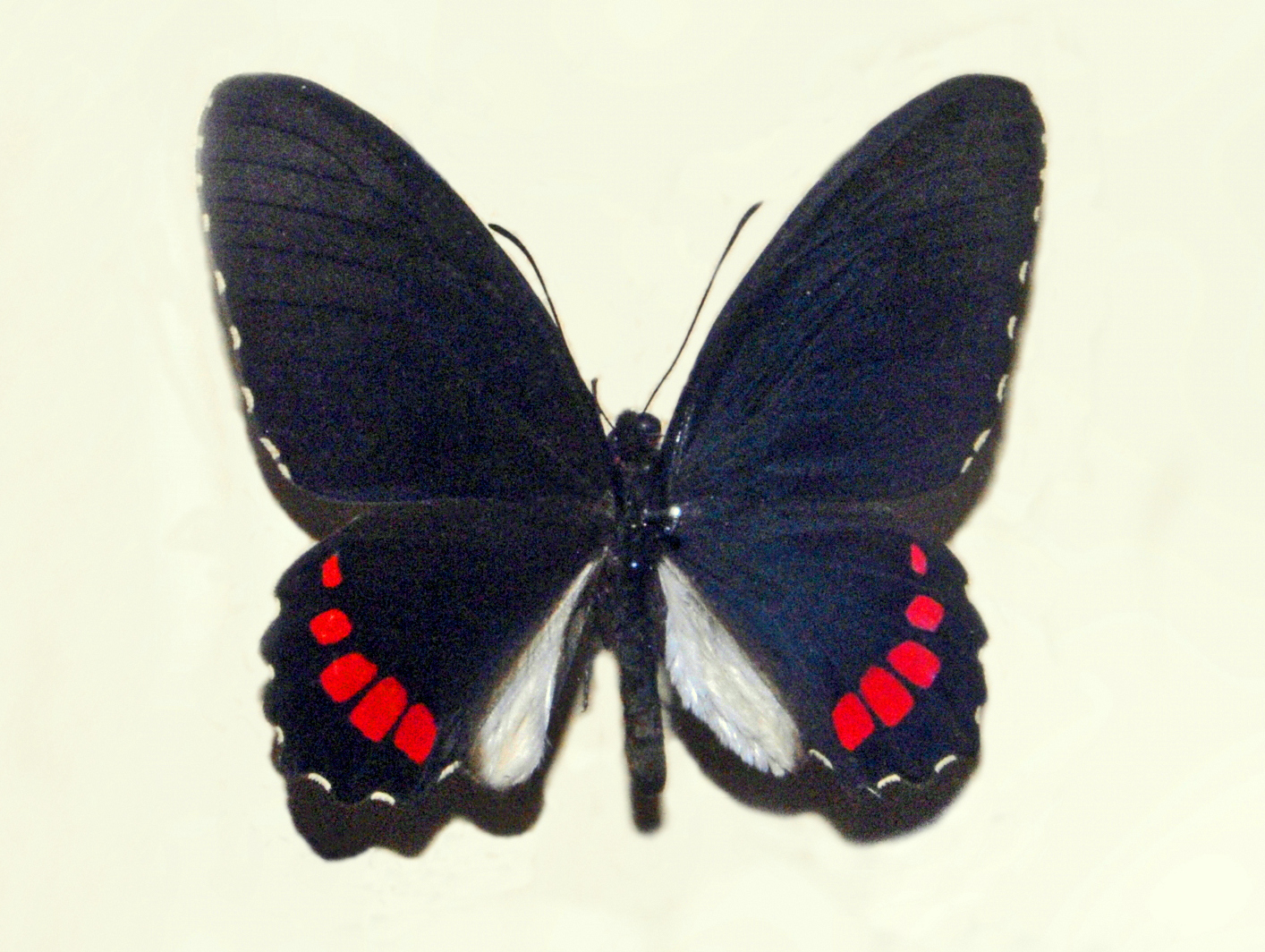
- P. e. polyzelus
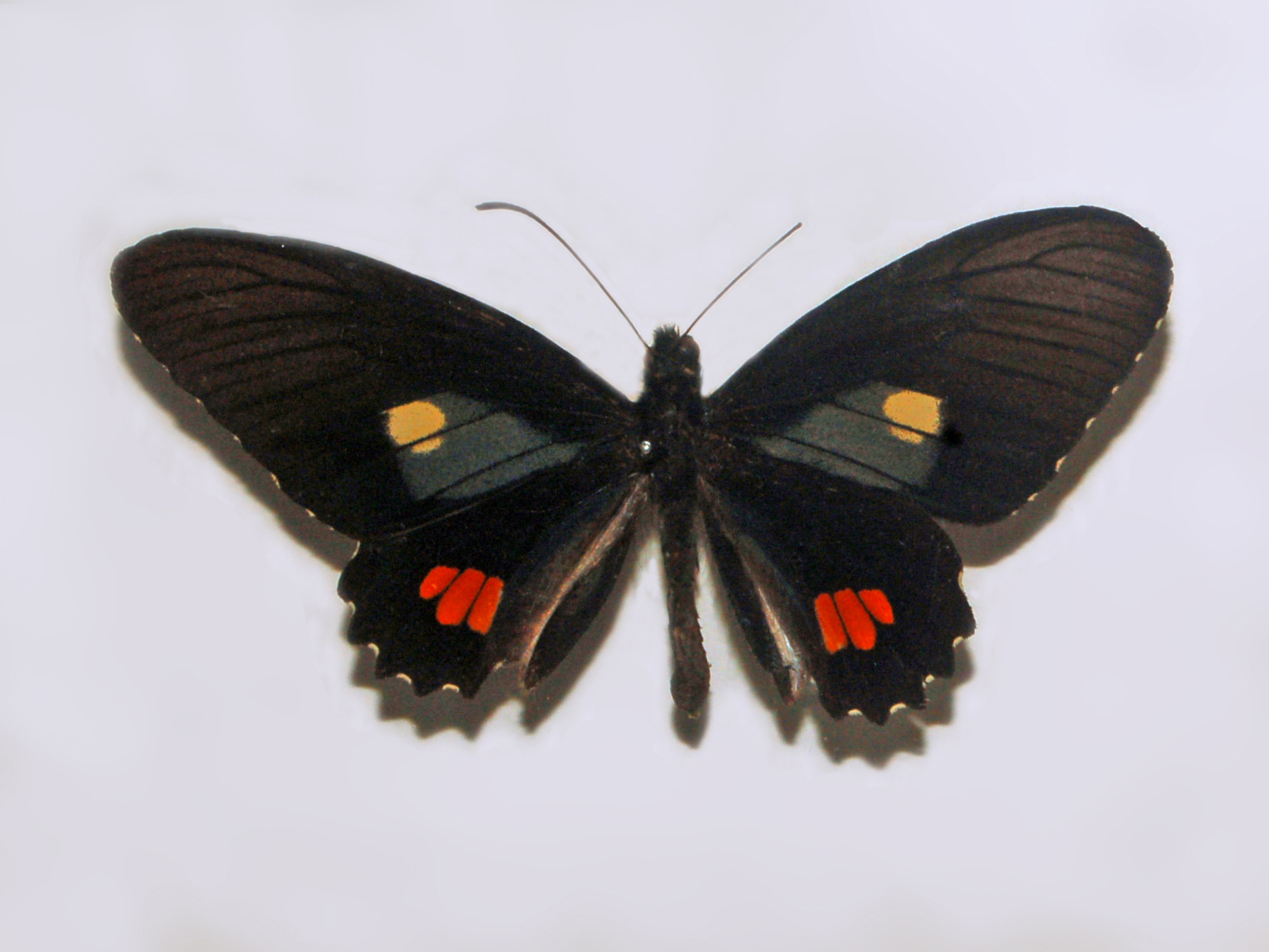
- P. e. erlaces male, from Peru

Scientific classification
- Kingdom: Animalia
- Phylum: Arthropoda
- Clade: Pancrustacea
- Class: Insecta
- Order: Lepidoptera
- Family: Papilionidae
- Genus: Parides
- Species: P. erithalion

Binomial name
- Parides erithalion (Boisduval, 1836)

Synonyms
- Papilio erithalion Boisduval, 1836

= Parides erithalion =

Variable cattleheart

Species of butterfly

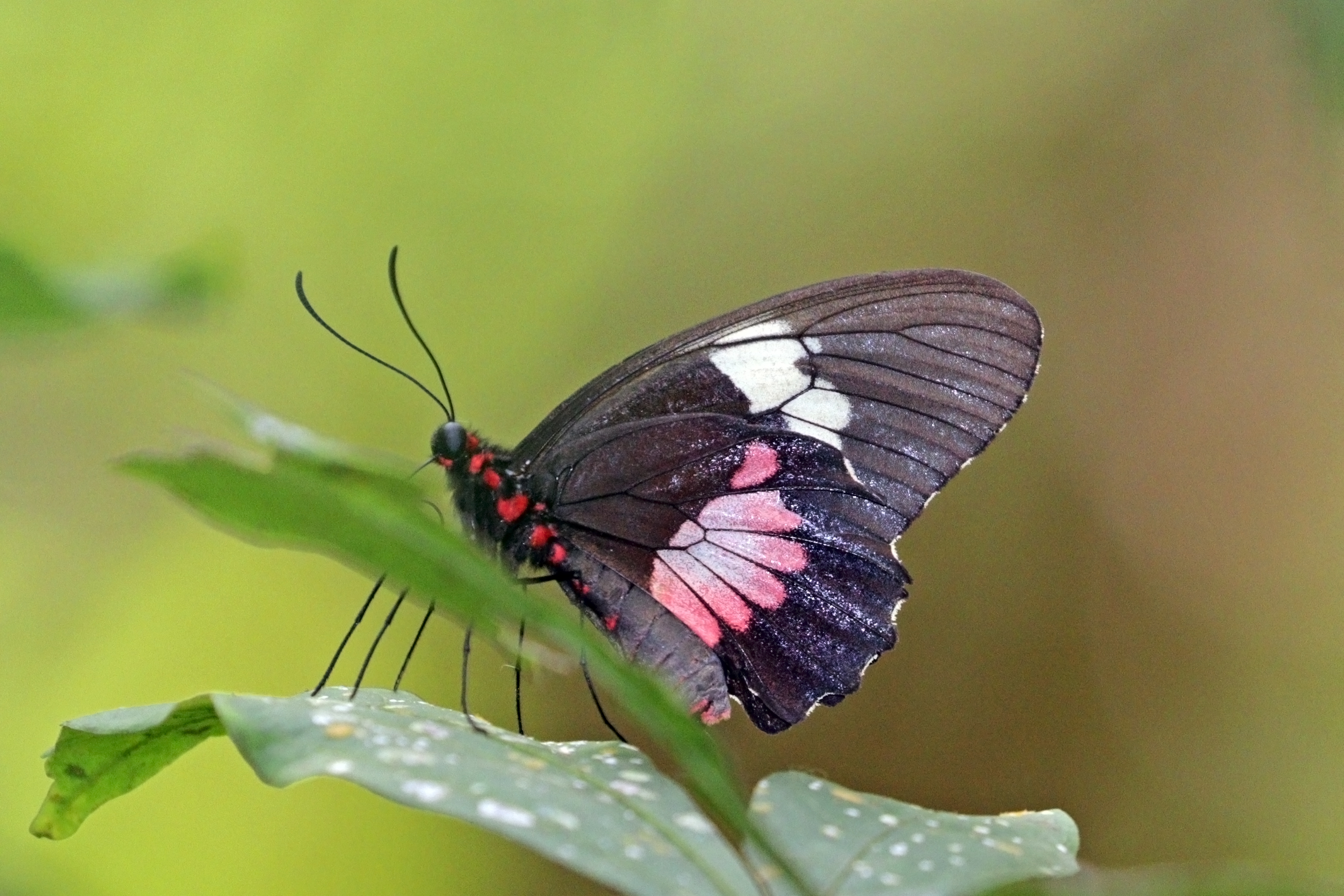
P. e. smalli, female, Panama

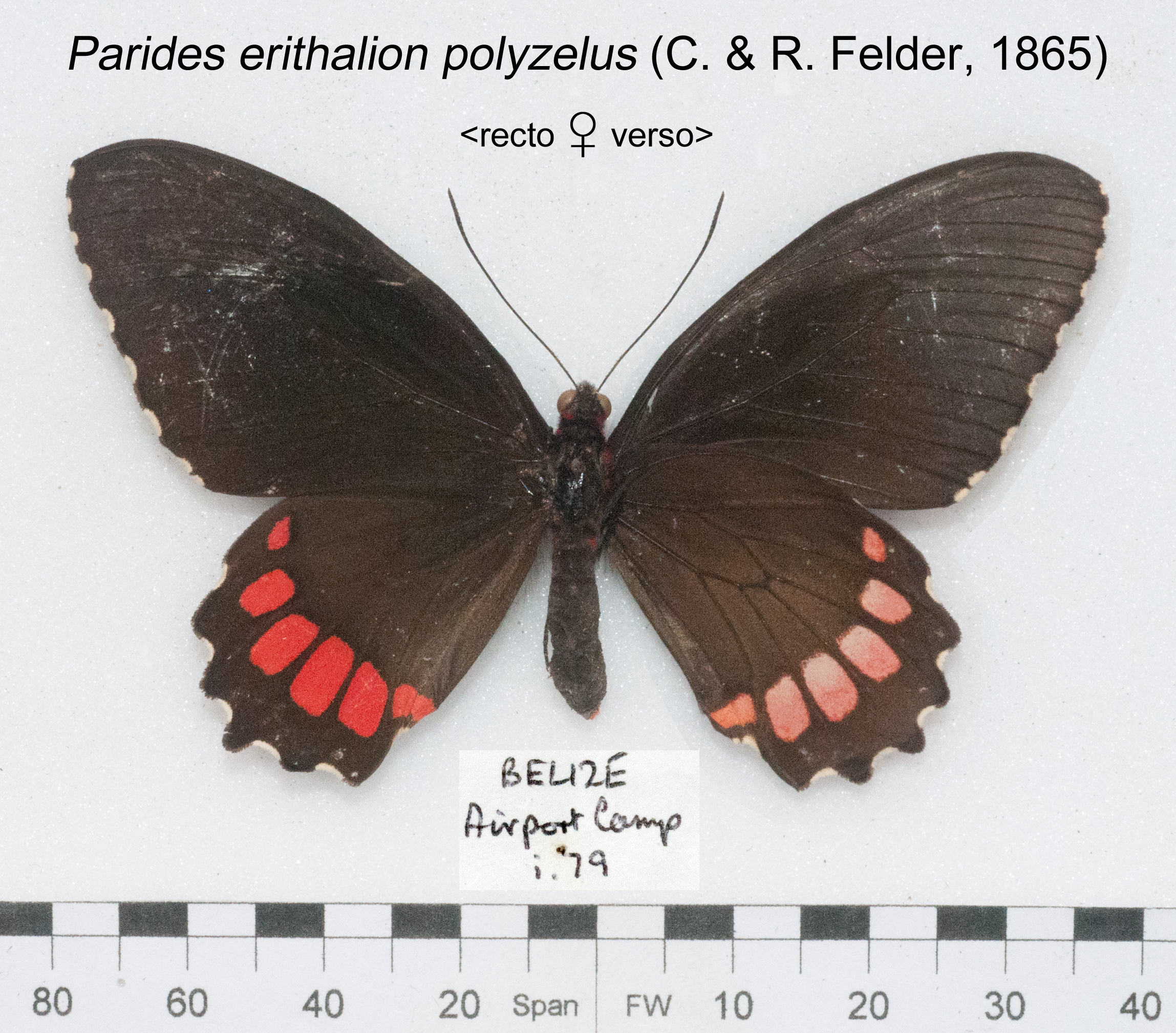
P. e. polyzelus, female. Belize

Parides erithalion, the variable cattleheart, is a North and South American butterfly in the family Papilionidae. The species was first described by Jean Baptiste Boisduval in 1836.

== Description ==
The upperside of the wings is black with a row of red postmedian spots. The underside of the wings is also black with a row of pink and whitish spots.

In males of some subspecies the uppersides of the forewings have a large olivaceous-green patch from the inner margin forward, with a creamy-white spot, while hindwings have a band of three red spots. Fringe in both sexes is dotted with white.

== Subspecies ==
- P. e. erithalion (C. Colombia)
- P. e. trichopus (Rothschild & Jordan, 1906) (Mexico)
- P. e. zeuxis (Lucas, 1852) (northern Venezuela)
- P. e. erlaces (Gray, 1853) (southern Peru, northern Bolivia, Paraguay, northern Argentina)
- P. e. polyzelus (C. Felder & R. Felder, 1865) (Mexico, Guatemala, El Salvador, Honduras)
- P. e. lacydes (Hewitson, 1869) (eastern Ecuador)
- P. e. sadyattes (H. Druce, 1874) (Costa Rica)
- P. e. cauca (Oberthür, 1879) (western Colombia)
- P. e. xanthias (Rothschild & Jordan, 1906) (Peru)
- P. e. chinchipensis (Joicey & Talbot, 1918) (northern Peru)
- P. e. kruegeri (Niepelt, 1927) (southern Colombia)
- P. e. guillerminae Pischedda & Racheli, 1986 (northeastern Ecuador)
- P. e. yaminahua Pischedda & Racheli, 1987 (southern Peru)
- P. e. keithi Racheli, 1991 (southwestern Venezuela)
- P. e. palmasensis Brown, 1994 (western Ecuador)
- P. e. smalli Brown, 1994 (Honduras, Costa Rica, Panama)
- P. e. callegarii Racheli & Racheli, 1996 (Peru)
- P. e. inini Brévignon, 1998 (French Guiana)
- P. e. racheliorum Lamas, 1998 (Peru)
- P. e. blanca Racheli & Möhn, 2001 (Peru)
- P. e. browni Le Crom, Constantino & Salazar, 2002 (northeastern Colombia)
- P. e. chocoensis Constantino, Le Crom & Salazar, 2002 (western Colombia)

== Description from Seitz ==
P. erithalion. Male: tibiae not thickened. Hindwing without distinct red spot behind the 2. median on the upper surface. Female: the spot before the 1. median of the forewing smaller than the preceding spot; band on the hindwing broad, pale on the innerside. Costa Rica to North Venezuela. — zeuxis Luc. (= rhameses Doubl., rhesus Koll., rhamases Fldr., abilius Fldr., rhamses Boisd.) (4a). Male: the green area much narrowed anteriorly, enclosing a large white spot before the 2. median; hindwing with 2 or 3 small red spots. Female: the posterior spot of the forewing larger than the preceding one. North Venezuela and eastern side of the Cordillera of Bogota. — erithalion Boisd. (4a) from Central Colombia (Rio Magdalena) has in the male rarely a white spot on the forewing, which is placed before the 1. median or between the radials. Female: the spot before the 1. median smaller than the preceding one; generally a few small spots outside the cell. — cauca Oberth. Male: the green area of the forewing wanting or merely indicated. Female: band on the hindwing narrow, curved, separated from the cell. Cauca valle — sadyattes Druce (4a). Male: the green area very variable, generally reduced, often wanting; all specimens with at least one white spot, which is placed before or behind the 3. radial, often a green spot in the cell. Female: band of the hindwing almost unicolorous bright red. Costa Rica to Panama.

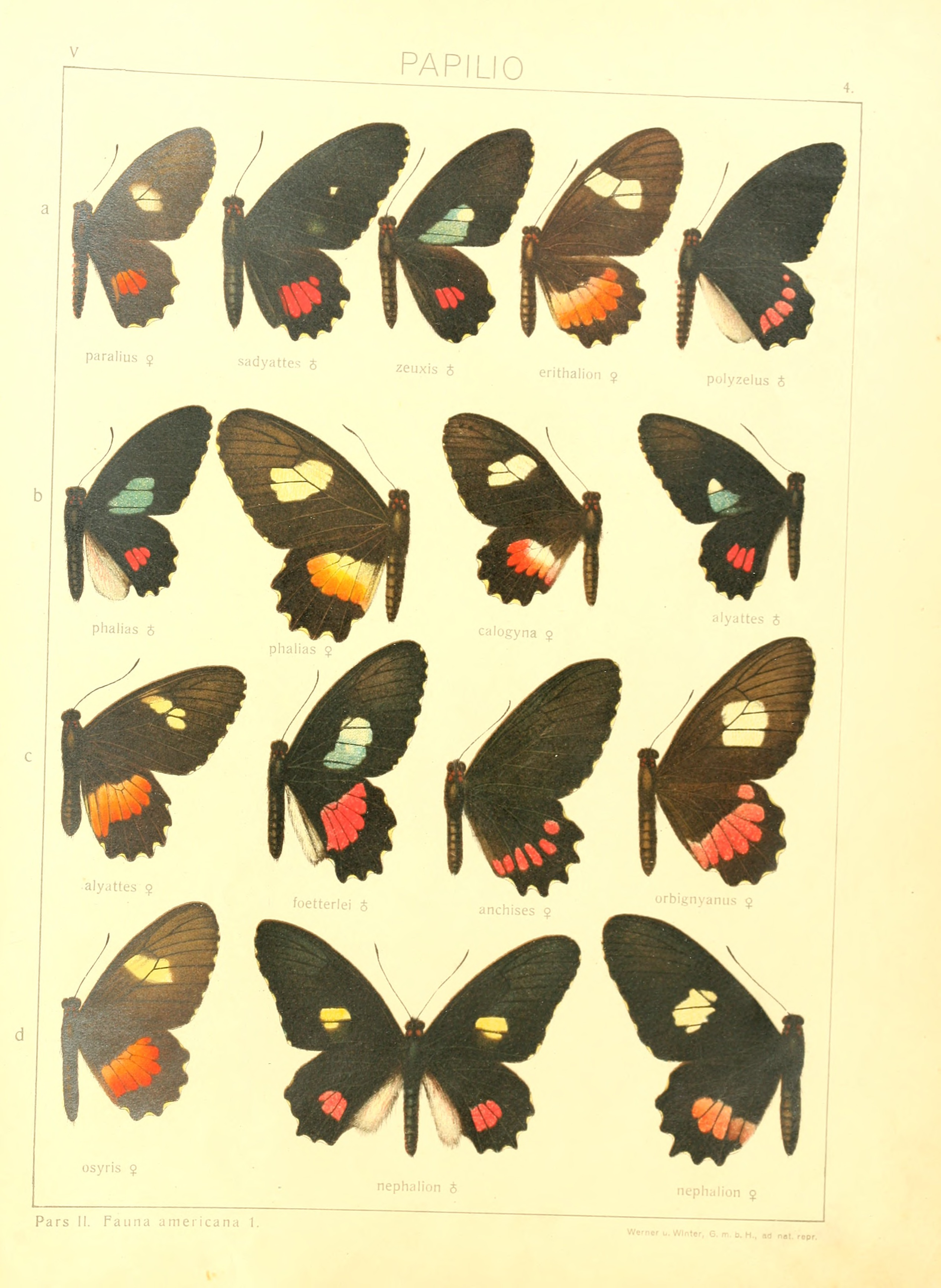
Seitz

== Description from Rothschild and Jordan (1906) ==
A full description is provided by Walter Rothschild and Karl Jordan (1906). Note: Here polyzelus is treated as a full species and trichopus is P. z. trichopus.

== Life cycle ==
The eggs are a brownish color. The caterpillar is brownish black with white and reddish-brown tubercles.

== Host plants ==
The variable cattleheart feeds on Aristolochia cordiflora.

== Status ==
It is common local species and not threatened.

== Taxonomy ==
Parides erithalion is a member of the anchises species group

The members are

- Parides anchises
- Parides cutorina
- Parides erithalion
- Parides iphidamas
- Parides panares
- Parides phosphorus
- Parides vertumnus
