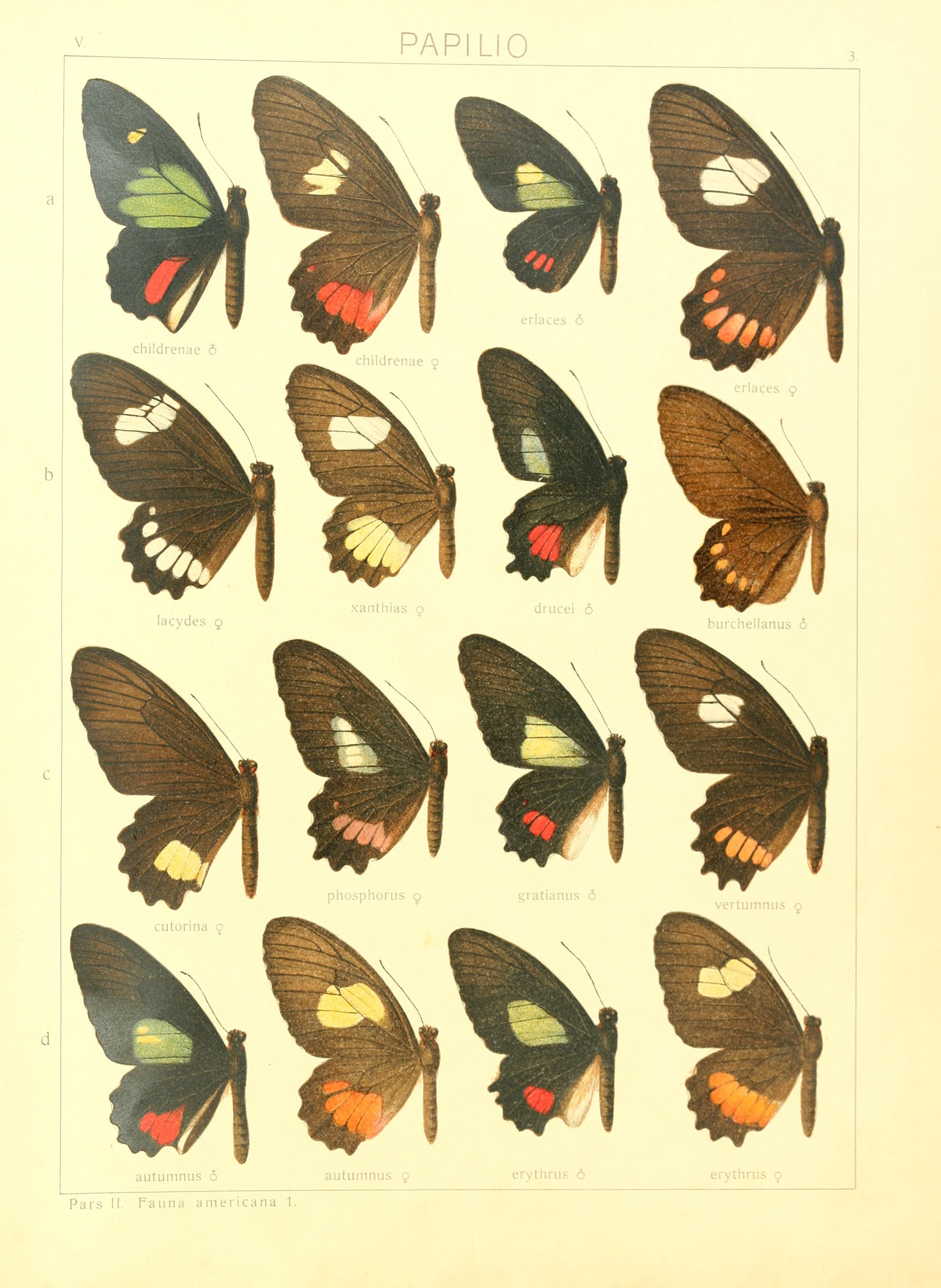
- Parides cutorina and related species

Scientific classification
- Kingdom: Animalia
- Phylum: Arthropoda
- Clade: Pancrustacea
- Class: Insecta
- Order: Lepidoptera
- Family: Papilionidae
- Genus: Parides
- Species: P. cutorina

Binomial name
- Parides cutorina (Staudinger, 1898)

Synonyms
- Papilio cutorina Staudinger, 1898; Papilio cutorina f. dilutus Joicey & Talbot, 1922; Papilio mazeppa Grose-Smith, 1899

= Parides cutorina =

Species of butterfly

Parides cutorina is a species of butterfly in the family Papilionidae. It is found in the Neotropical realm (Ecuador, Peru, and Brazil: Pará and Amazonas). It is an uncommon local species which may be threatened.

The larvae feed on Aristolochia.

== Description from Seitz ==
P. cutorina Stgr. (female = mazeppa Grose-Smith) (3 c). Palpi red. Forewing of the male with a green spot; in the female without spot, the fringes spotted with white. Hindwing in the male with two contiguous red spots on the upper surface, the spots on the under surface yellowish white; in the female the wing has a yellowish white band on both surfaces; 2. and 3. radials close together, the transverse vein between them not oblique. — Upper Amazon and slopes of the Andes of Ecuador and Peru.

== Description from Rothschild and Jordan(1906) ==
A full description is provided by Rothschild, W. and Jordan, K. (1906)

== Taxonomy ==
Parides cutorina is a member of the anchises species group

The members are

- Parides anchises
- Parides cutorina
- Parides erithalion
- Parides iphidamas
- Parides panares
- Parides phosphorus
- Parides vertumnus
