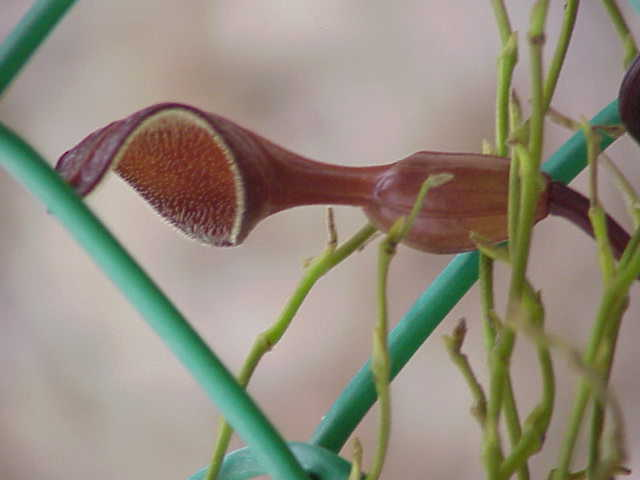

Scientific classification
- Kingdom: Plantae
- Clade: Tracheophytes
- Clade: Angiosperms
- Clade: Magnoliids
- Order: Piperales
- Family: Aristolochiaceae
- Genus: Aristolochia
- Species: A. maxima

Binomial name
- Aristolochia maxima Jacq.

Synonyms
- Aristolochia asperifolia Ule; Aristolochia biflora Duch. ex Klotzsch; Aristolochia biflora Willd. ex Duch.; Aristolochia geminiflora Kunth; Aristolochia mathewsii Duch.; Aristolochia maxima var. angustifolia Duch.; Aristolochia maxima var. geminiflora (Kunth) Duch.; Aristolochia mexicana D. Dietr.; Aristolochia oblongifolia Brandegee; Aristolochia reticulata Holton ex Duch.; Aristolochia reticulata Seem.; Aristolochia sprucei Mast.; Aristolochia wageneriana Schltdl.; Howardia geminiflora (Kunth) Klotzsch; Howardia gollmeri Klotzsch; Howardia hoffmannii Klotzsch; Howardia maxima (Jacq.) Klotzsch

= Aristolochia maxima =

Species of vine

Aristolochia maxima is a plant species native to Central and South America, naturalized in southern Florida. Common names include Florida Dutchman's-pipe (US), canastilla (Guatemala), guaco (El Salvador), and tecolotillo (Mexico). In Florida, it grows in hammocks in the Everglades at elevations below 50 m (170 feet).

Aristolochia maxima is a liana (woody vine) that can reach a height of 20 m (67 feet), twining over other plants. Leaves are truncate to cuneate at the base. Flowers are brownish-purple.
