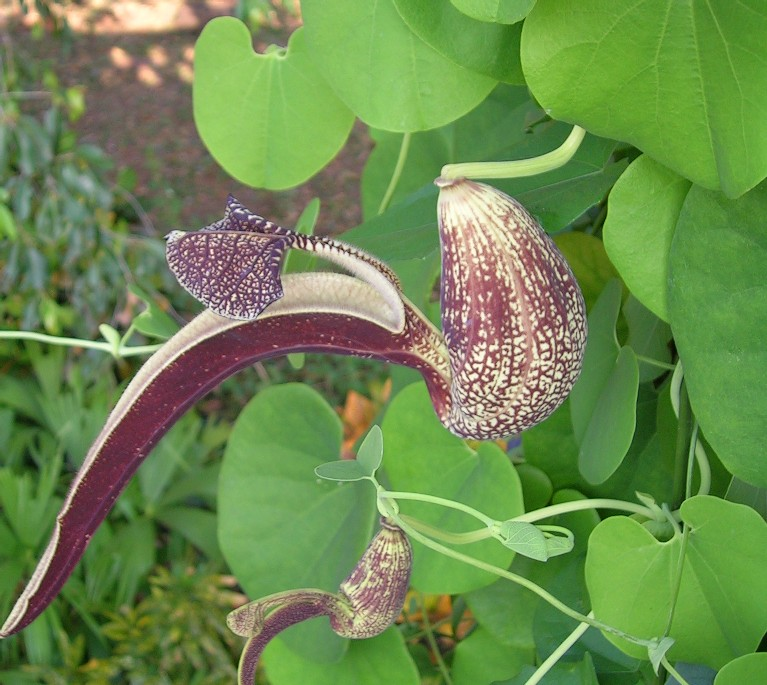

Scientific classification
- Kingdom: Plantae
- Clade: Tracheophytes
- Clade: Angiosperms
- Clade: Magnoliids
- Order: Piperales
- Family: Aristolochiaceae
- Genus: Aristolochia
- Species: A. ringens

Binomial name
- Aristolochia ringens Vahl 1794

= Aristolochia ringens =

Species of vine

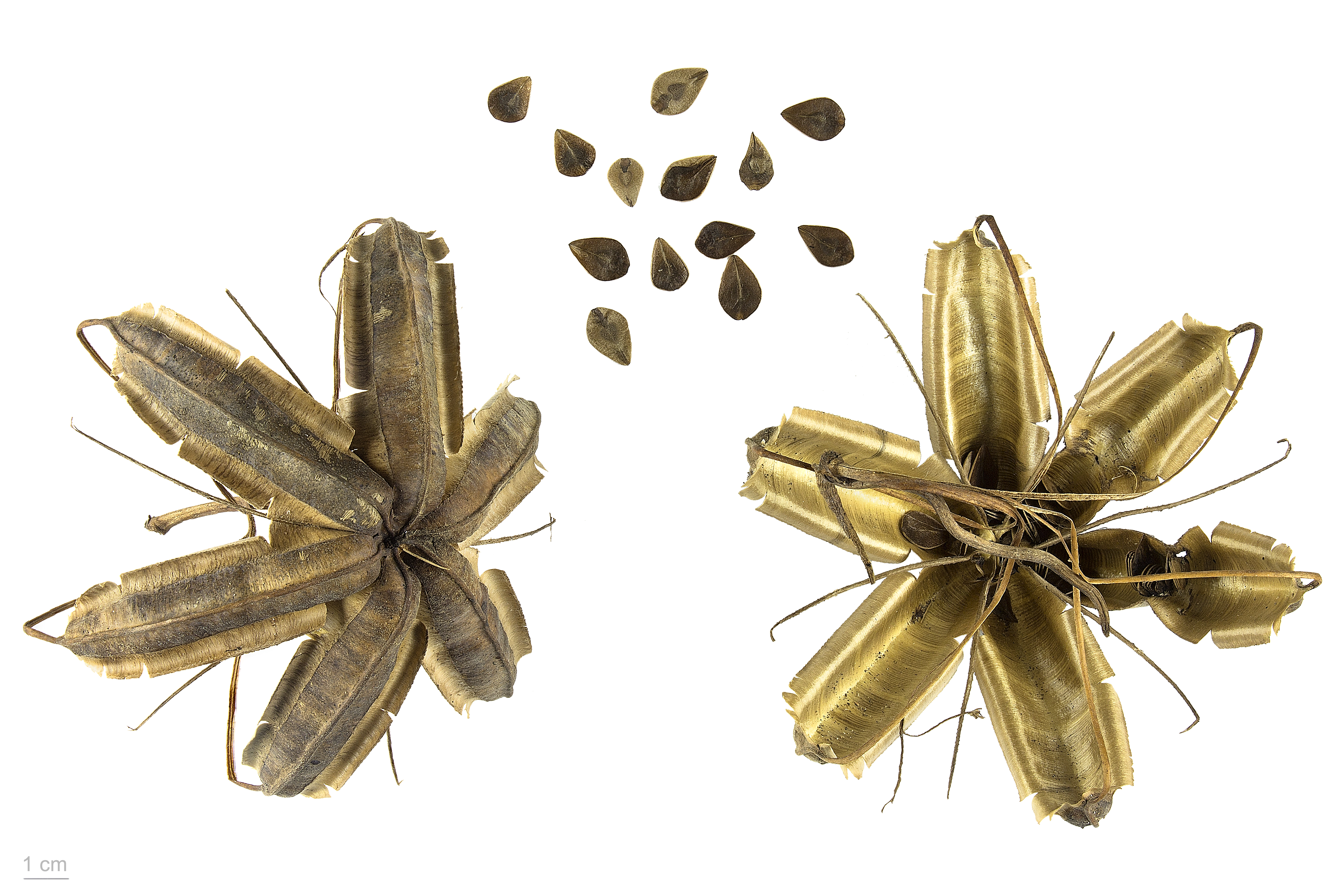
Aristolochia ringens - MHNT

Aristolochia ringens is a species of perennial plant in the family Aristolochiaceae. It is found from Panama through Bolivia, Colombia, and Venezuela.
