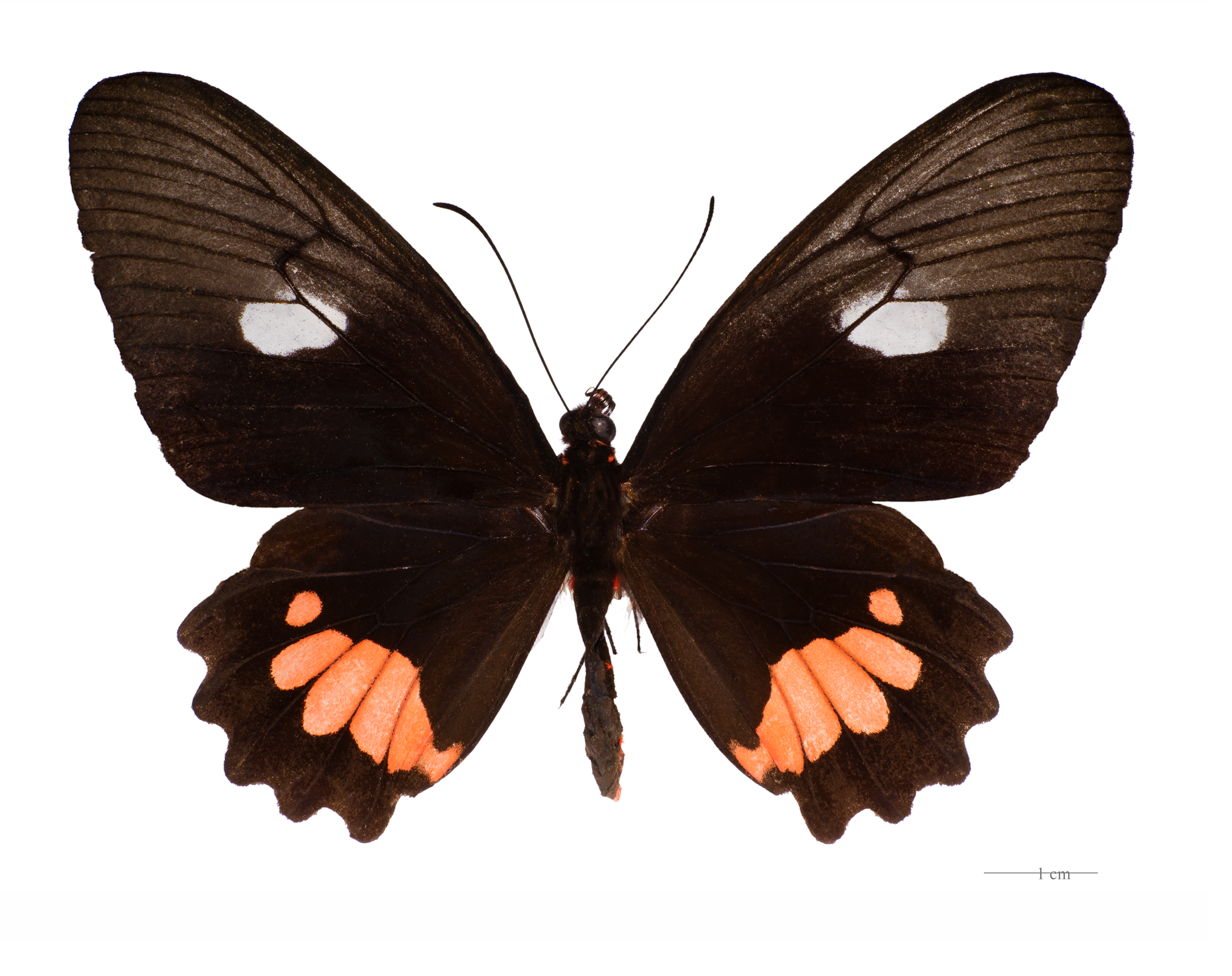
- Specimen in the collection of Muséum de Toulouse

Scientific classification
- Kingdom: Animalia
- Phylum: Arthropoda
- Class: Insecta
- Order: Lepidoptera
- Family: Papilionidae
- Genus: Parides
- Species: P. vertumnus

Binomial name
- Parides vertumnus (Cramer, 1779)

Synonyms
- Papilio vertumnus Cramer, [1779]; Papilio phronius Lucas, 1852; Papilio cixius Gray, [1853]; Papilio vertumnus ab. latoplaga Dufrane, 1930; Papilio vertumnus ab. rubropuncta Dufrane, 1930; Papilio vertumnus diceros f. regularis Rousseau-Decelle, 1943; Papilio cutora Gray, [1853]; Papilio cutora C. & R. Felder, 1864; Papilio diceros Gray, [1853]; Papilio idalion C. & R. Felder, 1865; Papilio vertumnus var. bogotanus C. & R. Felder, 1864; Papilio diceros ab. lineatransversa Krüger, 1933; Papilio vertumnus var. autumnus Staudinger, 1898; Papilio vertumnus yuracares Rothschild & Jordan, 1906; Papilio vertumnus f. nigripalpus Röber, 1929; Papilio vertumnus pseudobogotanus Krüger, 1926; Papilio vertumnus pyrophanus Zikán, 1937; Papilio vertumnus f. melanopterus Zikán, 1937; Papilio vertumnus vertumnalis Bryk, 1953; Papilio vertumnus astorius Zikán, 1940

= Parides vertumnus =

Species of butterfly

Parides vertumnus is a species of butterfly in the family Papilionidae. It is found in the Neotropical realm.

The larvae feed on Aristolochia species including A. elegans, A. odoratissima and A. acutifolia.

== Subspecies ==
- P. v. vertumnus Guianas, Surinam, French Guiana, eastern Venezuela
- P. v. cutora (Gray, [1853]) Brazil (Amazonas, Pará)
- P. v. diceros (Gray, [1853]) Brazil (Pará)
- P. v. bogotanus (C. & R. Felder, 1864) Colombia, Ecuador, northeastern Peru

== Description from Seitz ==
P. vertumnus. Palpi red. Forewing in the male with a green spot; in the female unicolorous or spotted with white. Hindwing of the male with triangular red area, which consists of 3 or 4 spots, of which the posterior one is usually the longest; in the female with a broad red band, consisting of 5—7 spots, of which the four posterior ones are more or less completely connected. One of the commonest species, which is often met with in the woods, settling in damp places at the edge of the brooks. Distributed from Colombia to Bolivia, Guiana and Para, but not yet found in Venezuela and Brazil proper.*[* Faunistically we understand by Brazil the eastern part of the continent from the province of Goyaz and Pernambuco to Rio Grande do Sul. In this district we find a fauna which is quite different in many respects fiom that of the rest of South America.] — yuracares R. & J. is the Bolivian subspecies. Only the male is known. The green spot touches the cell, and encloses at least one white spot. Hindwing with at least 4 red spots, of which the anterior two are separated; 5 small spots on the under surface. Found by J. Steinbach from January to April. — autumnus Stgr. (3d)., male : the green spot larger than in the preceding; hindwing with 3 red spots; 4 small red spots on the under surface. Female : forewing with very large yellowish area; cell-spot especially large. East Peru : Chanchamayo; undoubtedly extending further south. — bogotanus Fldr. Only the male known to us. Forewing without white spot; hindwing with rather large red area, the spots on the under surface small. Rio Palcazu north wards to "Bogota". — diceros Gray (= cixius Gray male = cutora Gray), Male: forewing usually without white spots in the green area; when present they are transverse, and somewhat obliquely placed; red area of the hindwing smaller than in the preceding forms, the spots on the under surface on the contrary generally larger. Female: forewing with chalky-white area, consisting of 2—4 spots, occasionally only one double spot present. Para to Iquitos. — vertumnus Cr (3 c) is distinguished in the male from all the other forms of the species by the short-haired middle and hind tibiae. The female as in the Amazon form, or the forewing with only one white spot, of which there is sometimes merely an indication. Guiana.

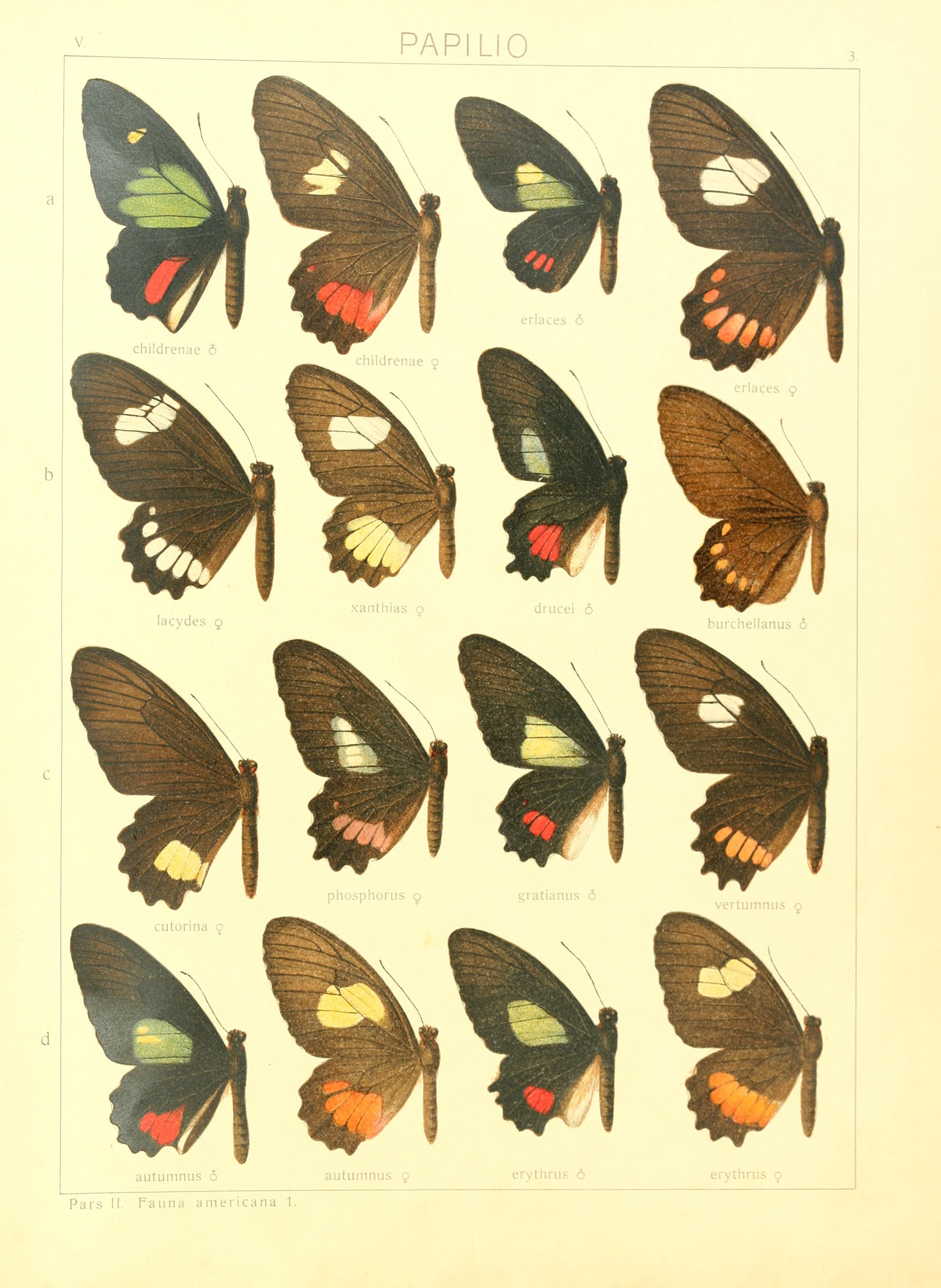
Seitz Plate 3d

== Description from Rothschild and Jordan(1906) ==
A full description is provided by Rothschild, W. and Jordan, K. (1906) See note on synonymy under Seitz (above).

== Etymology ==
It is named in the classical tradition. In Roman mythology, the god Vertumnus could change his form at will.
